= Northern Province (Portuguese India) =

Subdvision of the Portuguese colony of India

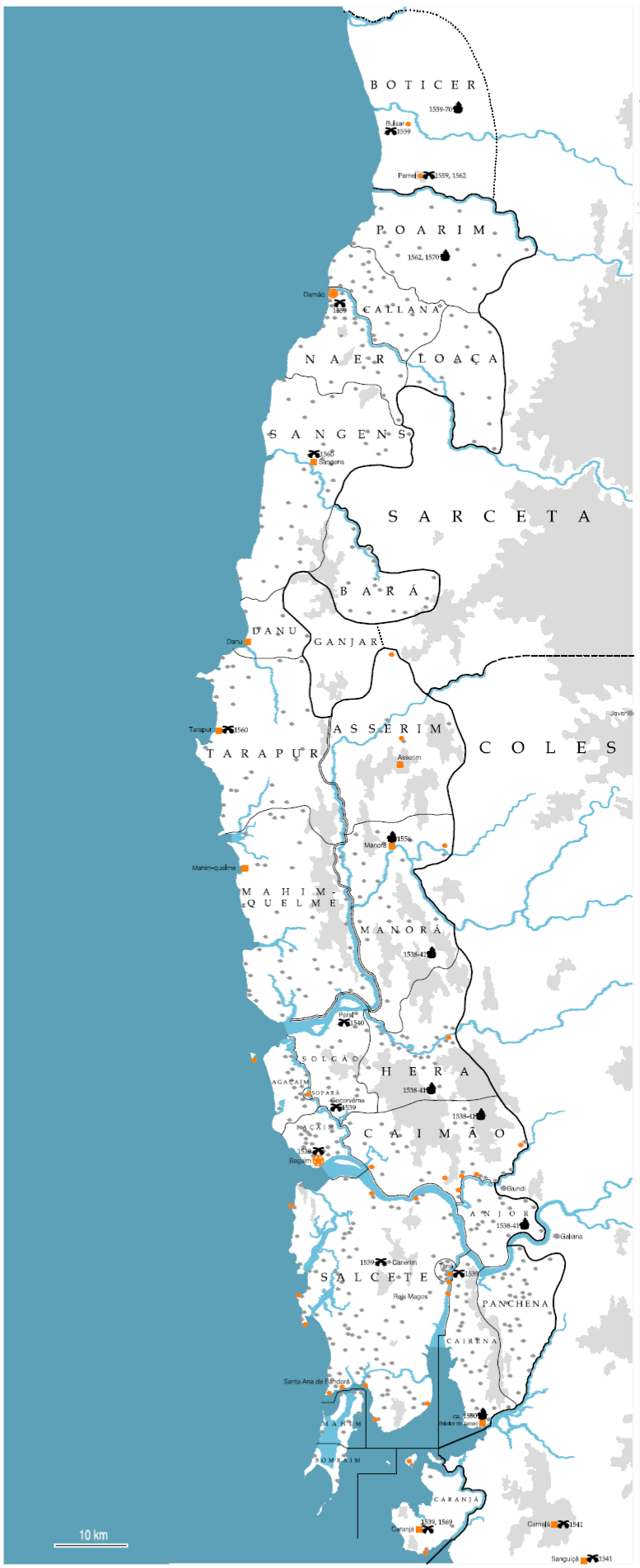
Map of the Northern Province at the end of the 16th century

The Northern Province (Portuguese: Província do Norte) was a subdivision of the Portuguese State of India that existed between 1534 and 1739, with its capital at Baçaim (Vasai).

The origin of the province lies in the conquest of Baçaim and the annexation of its hinterland in 1534. A war ensued that, by around 1542, confirmed Portuguese sovereignty over the entire Baçaim district. The Province expanded with the 1556 conquest of the praganas of Manorá and Asserim, which were subsequently integrated into the Baçaim district. The district of Damão was annexed in 1558, and the following year the Boticer pragana was added to it, though it was lost in 1581.

Most of the Province's territory fell permanently into Maratha hands in 1739. Following its collapse, part of the territory became the Portuguese exclave of Damão, held by Portugal until 1961. In 1783, Portugal annexed the pragana of Dadra and Nagar Haveli, formed from part of the Loaça pragana — itself part of the former Damão district between 1558 and 1739. This territory remained under Portuguese sovereignty until 1954.

== Subdvisions ==
The Northern Province was divided into two districts: Baçaim and Damão. Each district was subdivided into tanadarias, administrative and military divisions, which were further subdivided into praganas and cassabés, solely fiscal divisions.

Subdivision	District	Tanadaria	Location	Notes
Caranjá Cassabé	Baçaim	Caranjá	Uran	1534–1739. The only division where the position of tanadar was hereditary.
Bombaim Cassabé	Baçaim	Mahim-Bombaim	Mumbai	1534–1661
Mahim Cassabé	Baçaim	Mahim-Bombaim	Mahim	1534–1661
Salcete Island	Baçaim	Salcete Island	Salsette	1534–1739
Taná Cassabé	Baçaim	Taná	Thane	1534–1737
Panchena Pragana	Baçaim	Terra firme	Taloje Panchnand	1534–
Sabaio Pragana	Baçaim	Terra firme	Belapur	1542–1737
Cairena Pragana	Baçaim	Terra firme	Kopar Khairane	1534–1737
Baçaim Cassabé	Baçaim	Baçaim	Baçaim	1534–1739
Sopará Cassabé	Baçaim	Agaçaim	Nala Sopara	1534–
Agaçaim Cassabé	Baçaim	Agaçaim	Agashi	1534–
Anjor Pragana	Baçaim	Terra firme	Anjur	1534–
Caimão Pragana	Baçaim	Campo de Baçaim	Kaman	1534–1737
Herá Pragana	Baçaim	Campo de Baçaim	Hedavade	1534–1737
Solgão Pragana	Baçaim	Campo de Baçaim	Koshimbe	1534–
Manorá Pragana	Baçaim	Manorá	Manor	1556–1739
Asserim Pragana	Baçaim	Asserim	Asheri	1556–1684, 1687–1739
Mahim-Quelme Pragana	Damão	Mahim-Quelme	Mahim	1559–1739
Tarapur Pragana	Damão	Tarapur	Tarapur	1559–1739
Danu Pragana	Damão	Danu	Dahanu	1559–1739
Bará Pragana	Damão	Sangens	Bahare	1559–
Sangens Pragana	Damão	Sangens	Sanjan	1559–1739
Naer Pragana	Damão	Campo	Daman	1559–1961. Parts of this pragana formed part of the Daman exclave until 1961.
Callana Pragana	Damão	Campo	Nani Daman	1559–1961. Parts of this pragana formed part of the Daman exclave until 1961.
Loaça Pragana	Damão	Campo	Lavachha	1559–1954. Parts of this pragana formed part of the Dadra and Nagar Haveli exclave until 1954.
Poarim Pragana	Damão	Campo	Killa-Pardi	1559–1739
Boticer Pragana	Damão		Valsad	1559–1581

An eleventh pragana in the District of Daman, the Ganjar pragana, de jure belonged to Portugal; but Portuguese control was never imposed in that territory.

== See also ==
- Norteiro people
- Battle of Vasai

== Bibliography ==
- Mendiratta, Sidh Daniel Losa (2012). Dispositivos do Sistema Defensivo da Província do Norte do Estado da Índia, 1521-1739 (Doctor thesis) (in Portuguese). Coimbra: Coimbra University.
