= Kohoj =

Indian medieval military installation

Kohoj Fort
- Waghote village, Palghar district, Maharashtra
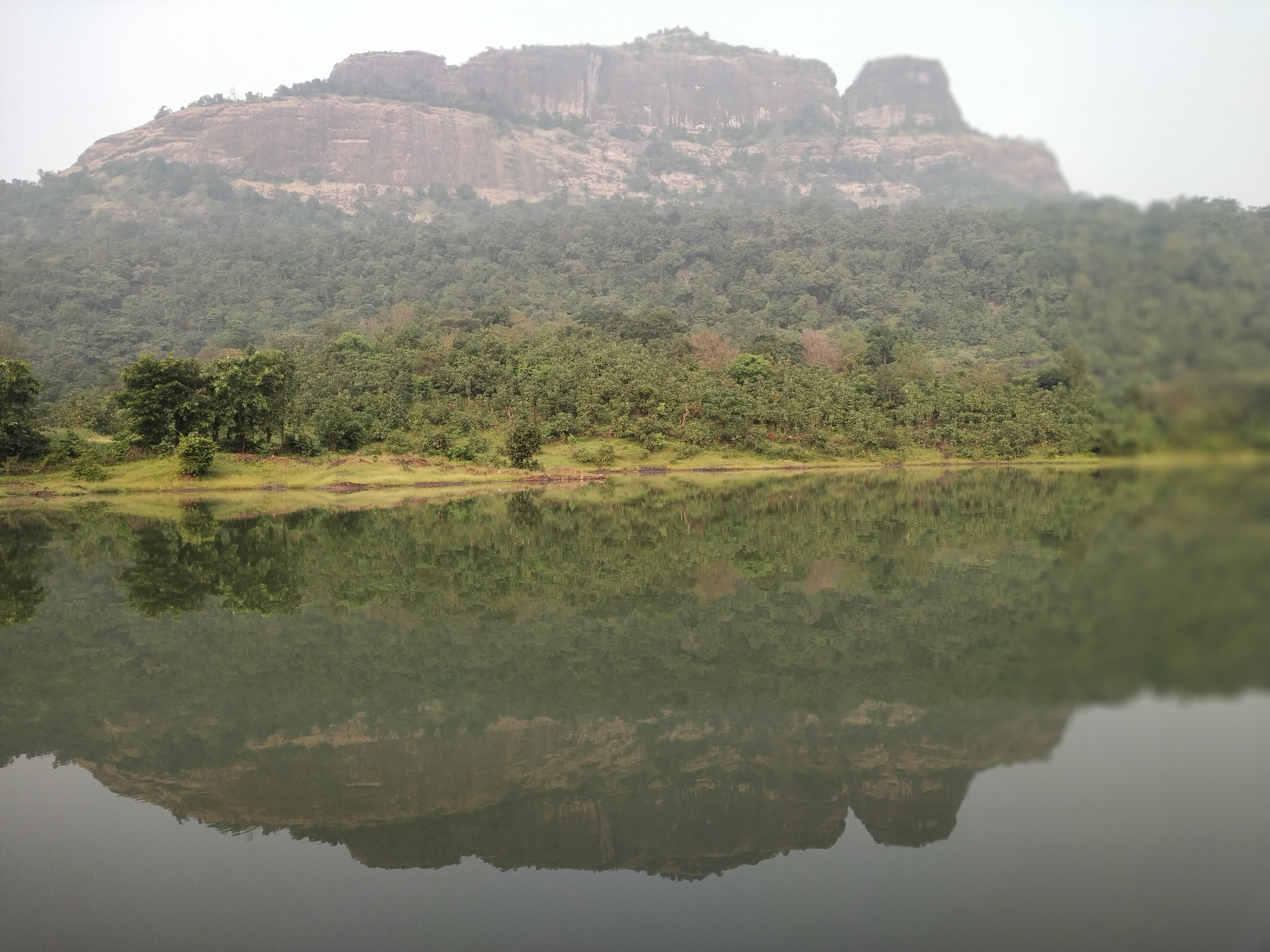
- Kohoj fort

Site information
- Owner: Government of India
- Controlled by: Maratha Empire (till 1637)Maratha Empire (1716-1820); British Raj (1820-1947); Government of India (1947-)
- Open to the public: Yes

Location
- Waghote village near Palghar in Maharashtra Kohoj Fort (India)
- Coordinates: 19.6700315°N 72.9875099°E
- Height: 2,000 feet (610 m)

Site history
- In use: Abandoned
- Demolished: Dilapidated

Kohoj is a medieval military fortification located near Palghar in Palghar district in Maharashtra, India.

== Location ==
Kohoj is located about 104 km from Mumbai off the Mumbai - Ahmedabad Highway. Upon reaching Manor you have to take a right turn under a newly built flyover and take the Manor - Wada road. It is approximately around 10 km from the right turn. A few minutes drive on this road and one can see the Kohoj fort on your right. At the bottom of the fort is a lake known as 'Pazhar'.

== History ==
The fort is said to be about 800 years old and finds a mention in the Purandar treaty along with 22 other forts which were surrendered by Shivaji Maharaj to the Mughals on 11 June 1665. It was also an important fort for keeping a look on the nearby coast and thus to keep the territory safe and secure.

== Architecture ==
Kohoj Fort is in a dilapidated state and has remained abandoned for centuries. Kohoj has a moderately difficult gradient and it takes about two and a half hours to reach the main plateau from Vaghote village which is situated at the base of the fort.

Access to Kohoj Fort is via the main trek trail at which breaks from the Kohoj Fort road near the Saltwater lake on the Wada-Manor road. On reaching the plateau of the fort, a temple of Lord Shankar can be seen, which has now been rehabilitated. There were ten rock cut cisterns on the fort Two cisterns can be seen in front of the temple. One of the routes descends from the left side of the temple, where seven adjoined cisterns are located. One of the cisterns bears clean water. The other two cisterns have been spoiled, the remaining four being clogged. Few remnants in dilapidated state can be seen to the right of the temple. Fortification is also seen at some of the places on the fort. The other way stretches from the right side of the temple up the hill. Three large cisterns can be seen on this route, one of which is clogged and the other two contain water. This water can be used for drinking. An idol of Lord Hanumana can be seen near these cisterns.

A man-shaped pinnacle created due to wind-erosion is one of the best natural sites on the fort. Different shapes of this pinnacle are evident when viewed from various directions. A temple of Lord Krishna is situated ahead along this route. To reach the highest point it takes another 10–15 minutes. The height of the fort is about 3200 feet. From the top of the fort are seen Tandulwadi fort, Takmak fort, Asheri fort, Mahalaxmi pinnacle and the Arabian sea.

There is no accommodation on the fort. The temple of Lord Shiva can hardly accommodate two persons at a time.

== Gallery ==
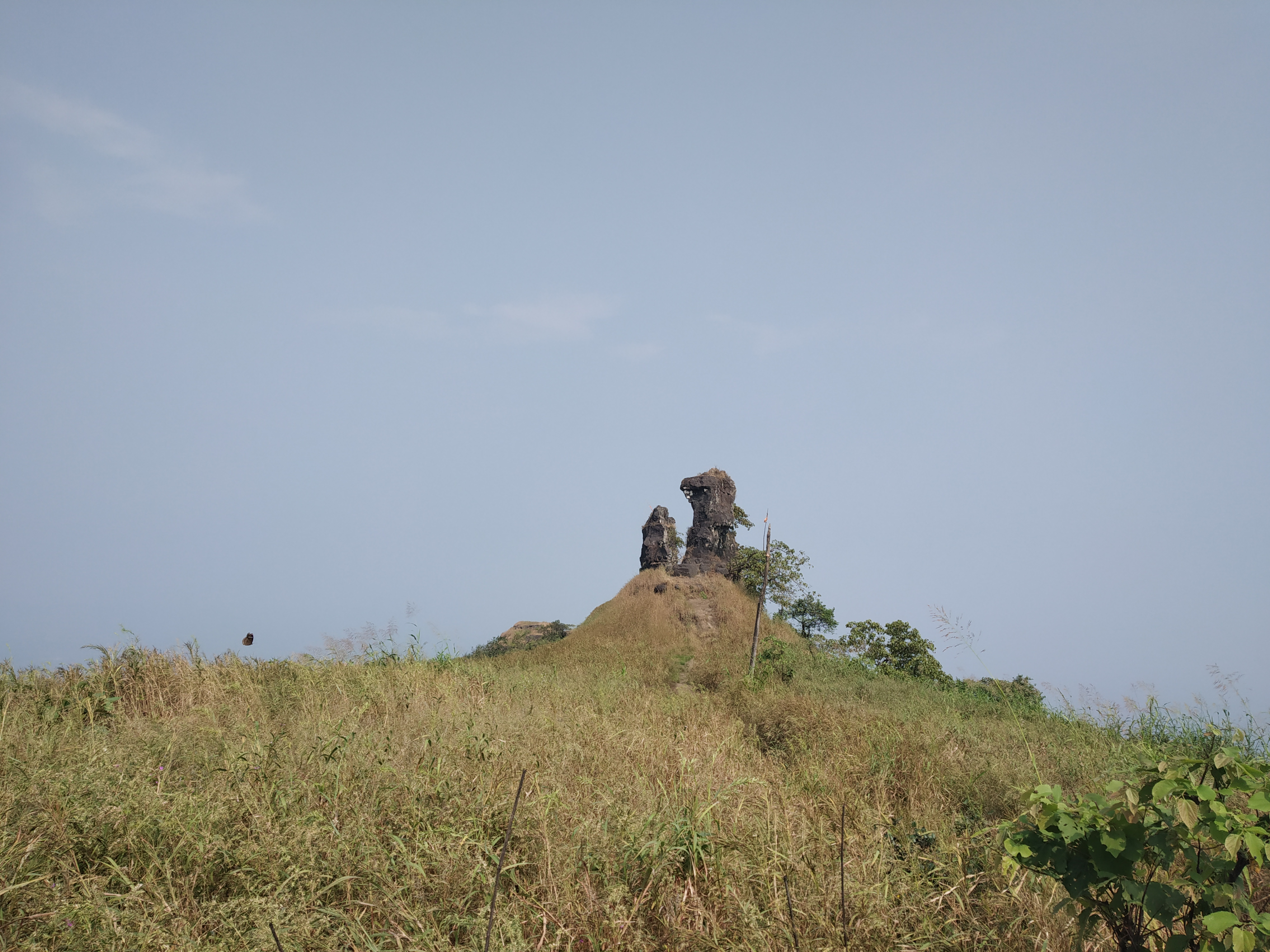
Pinnacles on fort

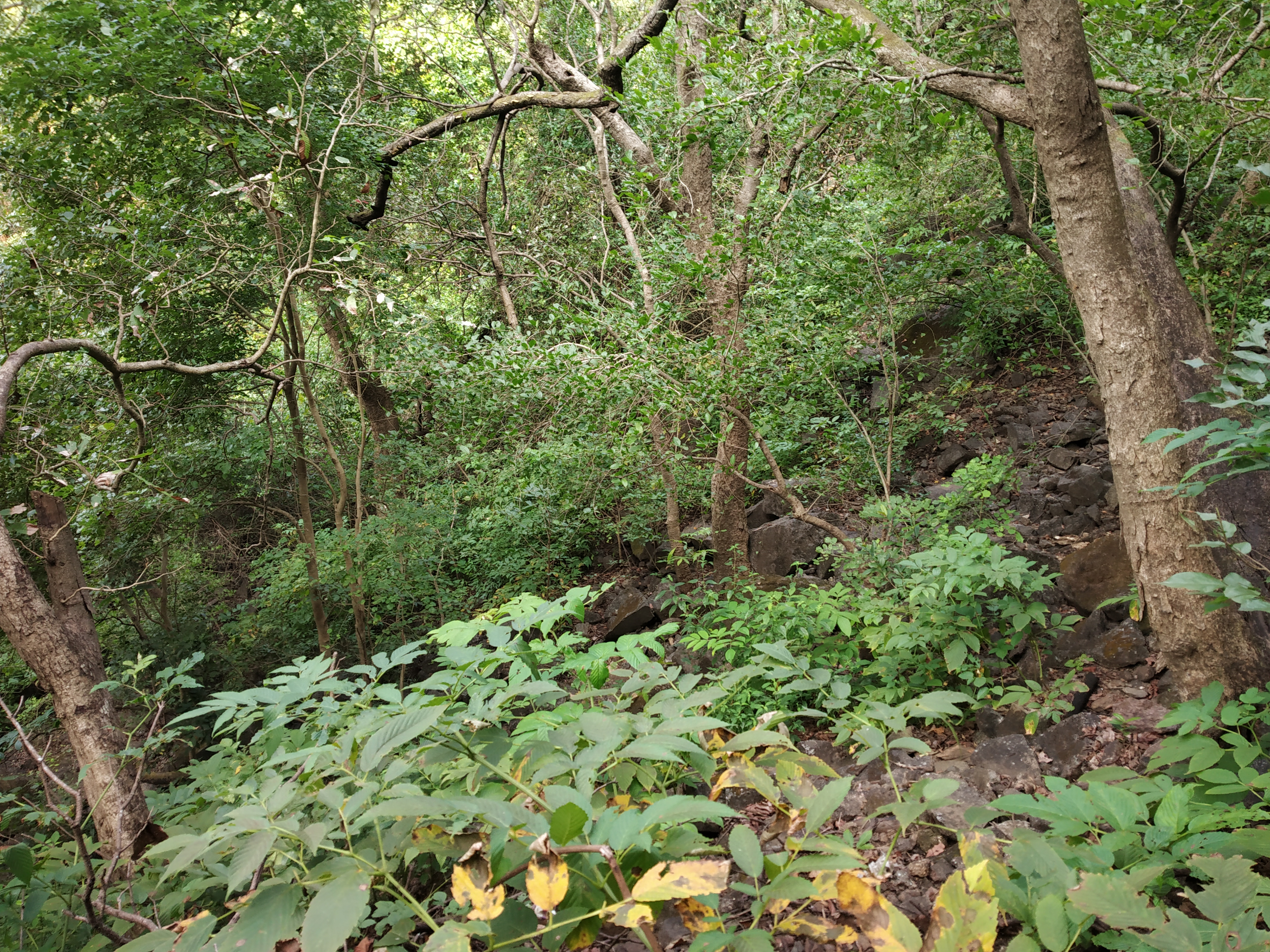
Forest on the way to fort

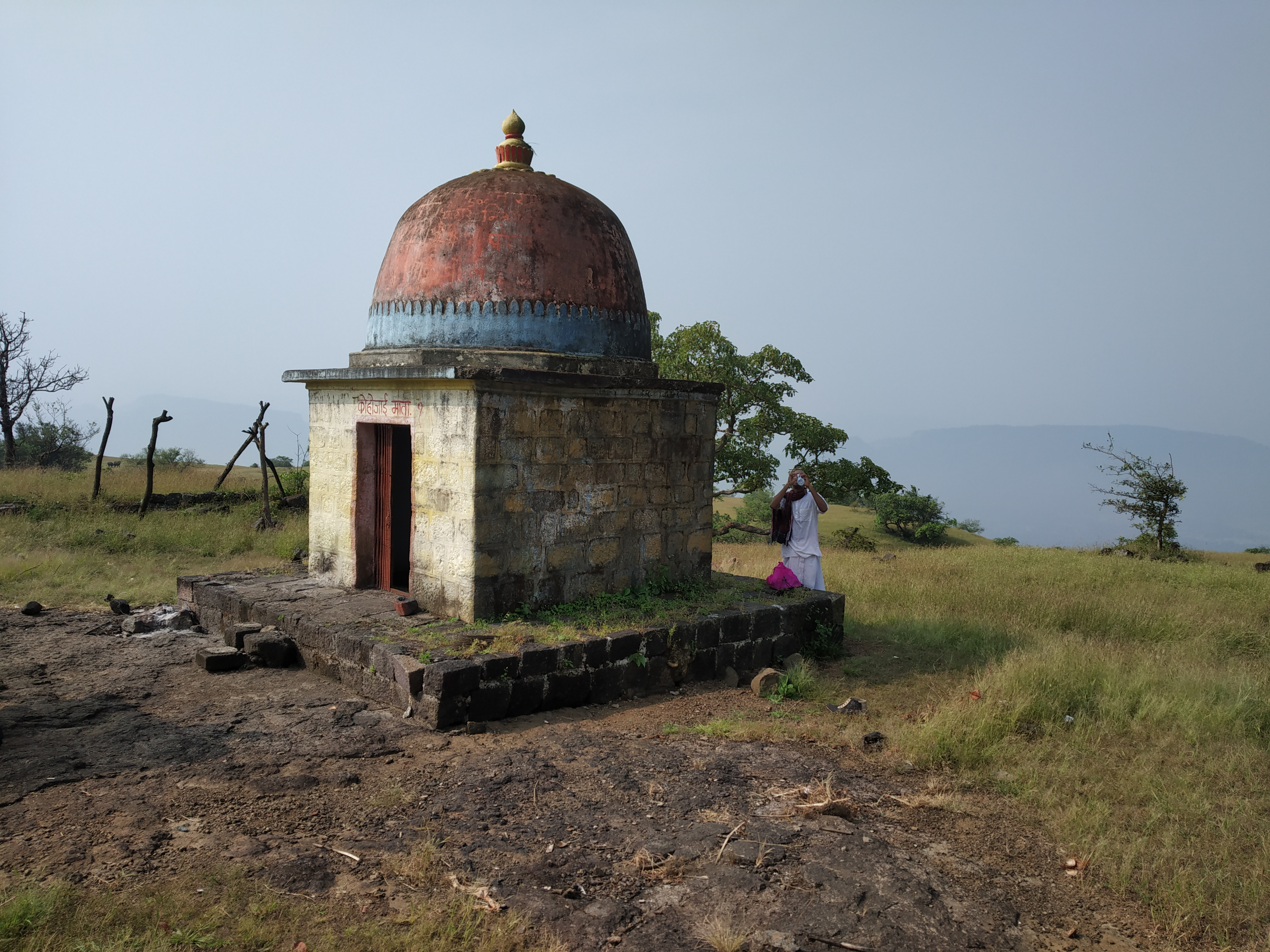
Shiva temple

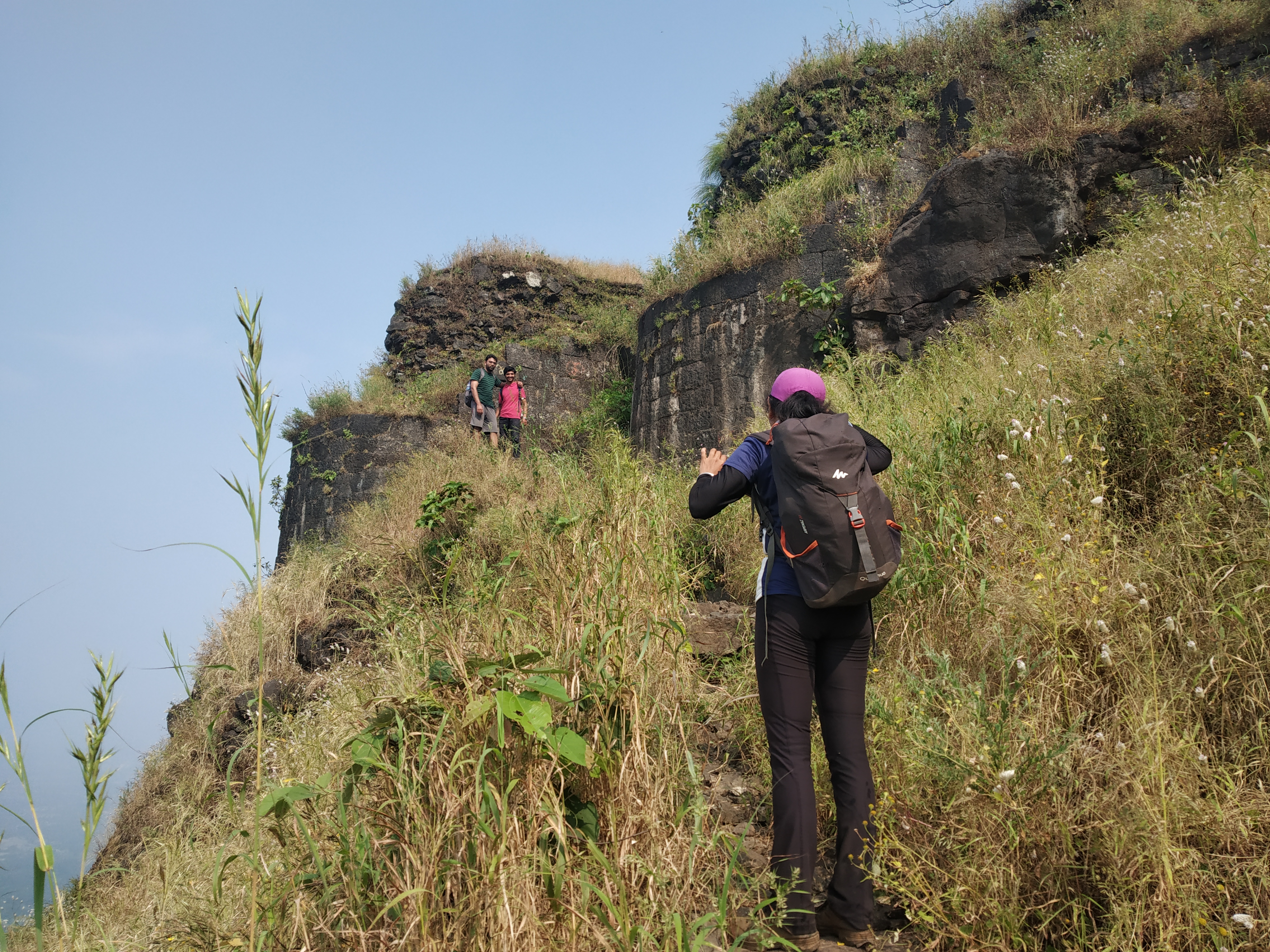
Trek path

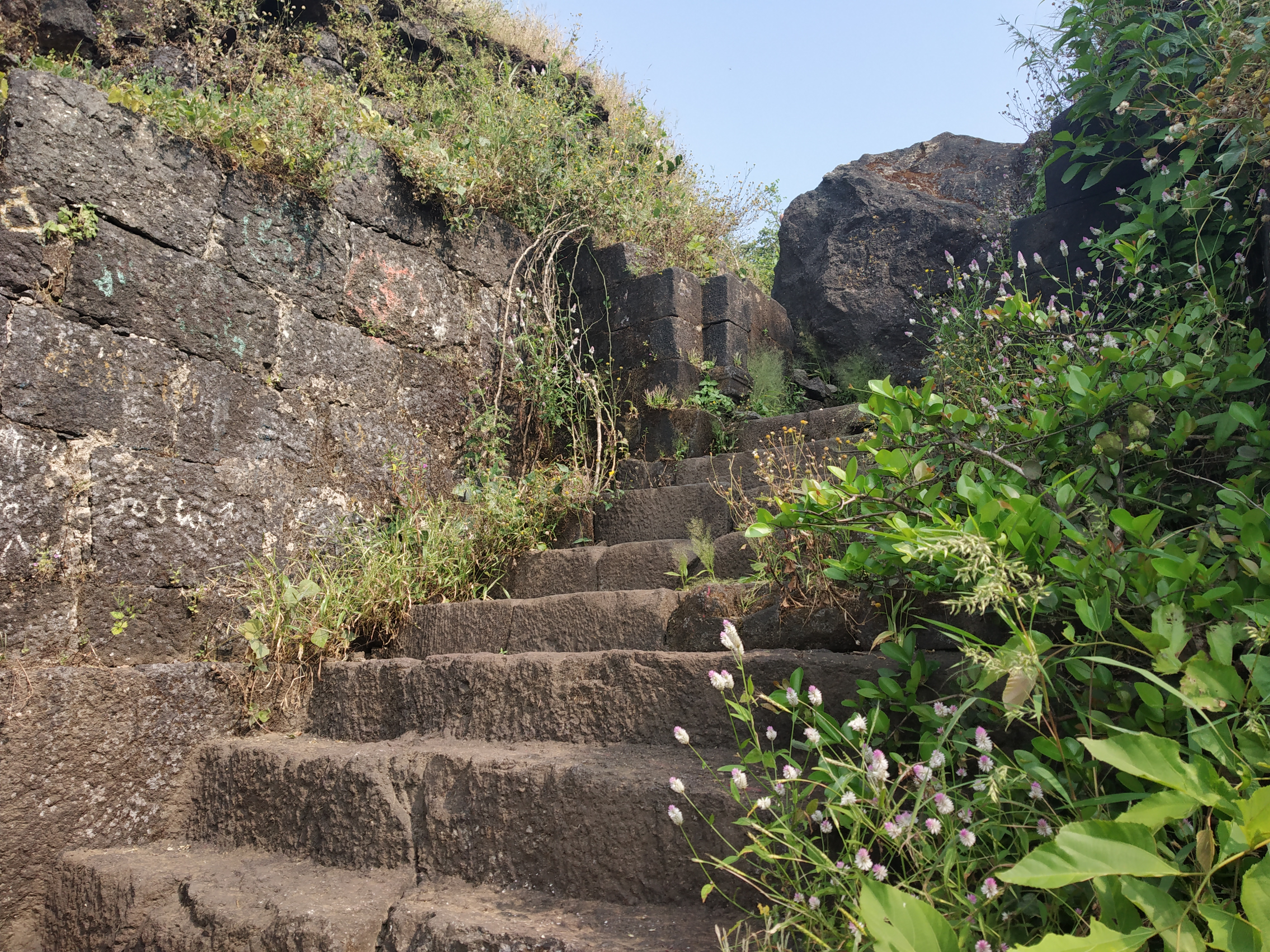
Entrance to top fort

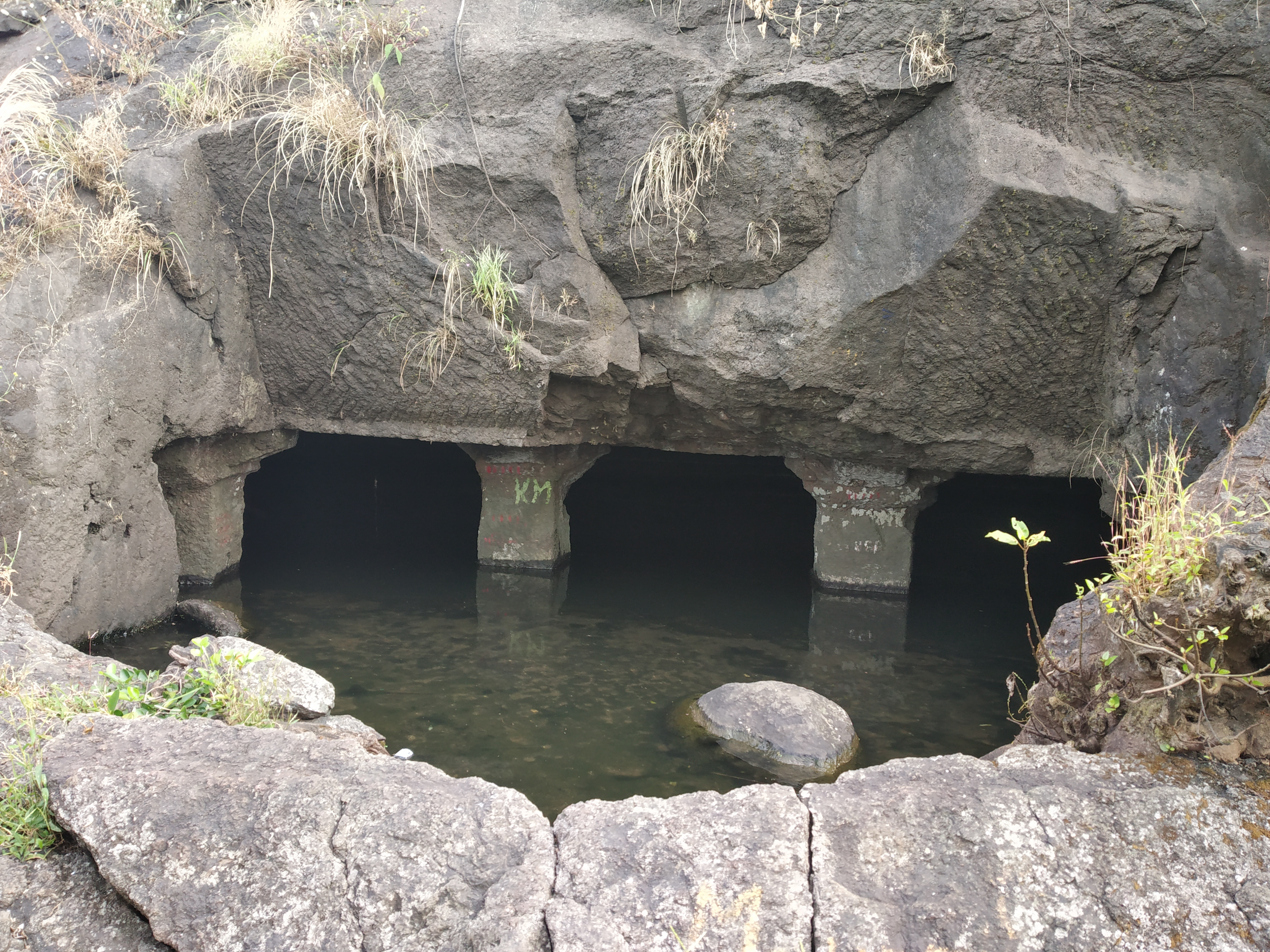
Rockcut water cistern

View of the valley in monsoon

Trekkers on trail

Hanuman idol, near a water cistern
