= New Manor Town =

- Affordable Housing Project
- Location in Maharashtra, India
- Coordinates: 19.725034°N 72.900843°E
- Country: India
- State: Maharashtra
- District: Palghar
- Established: 2013

Languages
  - Official: Marathi
- Time zone: UTC+5:30 (IST)
- Nearest station: Palghar
- www.newmanortown.in

New Manor Town is an affordable housing project in the town of Manor, India. The housing complex is near the industrial towns of Palghar and Boisar.

== Location ==
New Manor Town is located 78 km from Mumbai in the newly formed Palghar district, now considered a part of Mumbai's Extended Western Suburb. It is well connected via rail and road. Palghar is the nearest railway station on the Mumbai's Western Line (Mumbai Suburban Railway) while the Mumbai-Ahmedabad National Highway 8 (India) connects Manor to Mumbai. The Manor-Wada Road conveniently connects to Nashik and the interiors of Maharashtra.

=== Employment centers ===
- MIDC Tarapur, Maharashtra's largest industrial belt, is located 30 min from Manor
- Palghar, the district headquarters of Maharashtra's 36th and newest district, is only 20 min from New Manor Town

== Rapid urbanization ==
The newly formed Palghar district is home to almost 3 million people and has seen population growth of 40% between 2001-2011 as per the Census of India. Palghar's population growth rate even overshadows Thane's growth of 36% during the same period. Being 35% urbanized, the newly formed district has a population density of 562/km^{2}, making it more densely populated than Poona. Thanks to the 'Housing for All' government scheme and the Make In India initiative to boost manufacturing, this industrial area can be expected to prosper, especially considering its proximity to Mumbai, India's business capital.

== Infrastructure ==
New Manor Town was made self-sustainable by placing civic infrastructure like schools, colleges, hospitals and banks within walking distance from the market place. Additionally, travelling is made convenient by taxis to Palghar and Boisar.
