= Tandulwadi Fort =

Fort in Mumbai, India

- Part of Palghar Hill Range
- Tandulvadi (Lalthane), Palghar district, Maharashtra
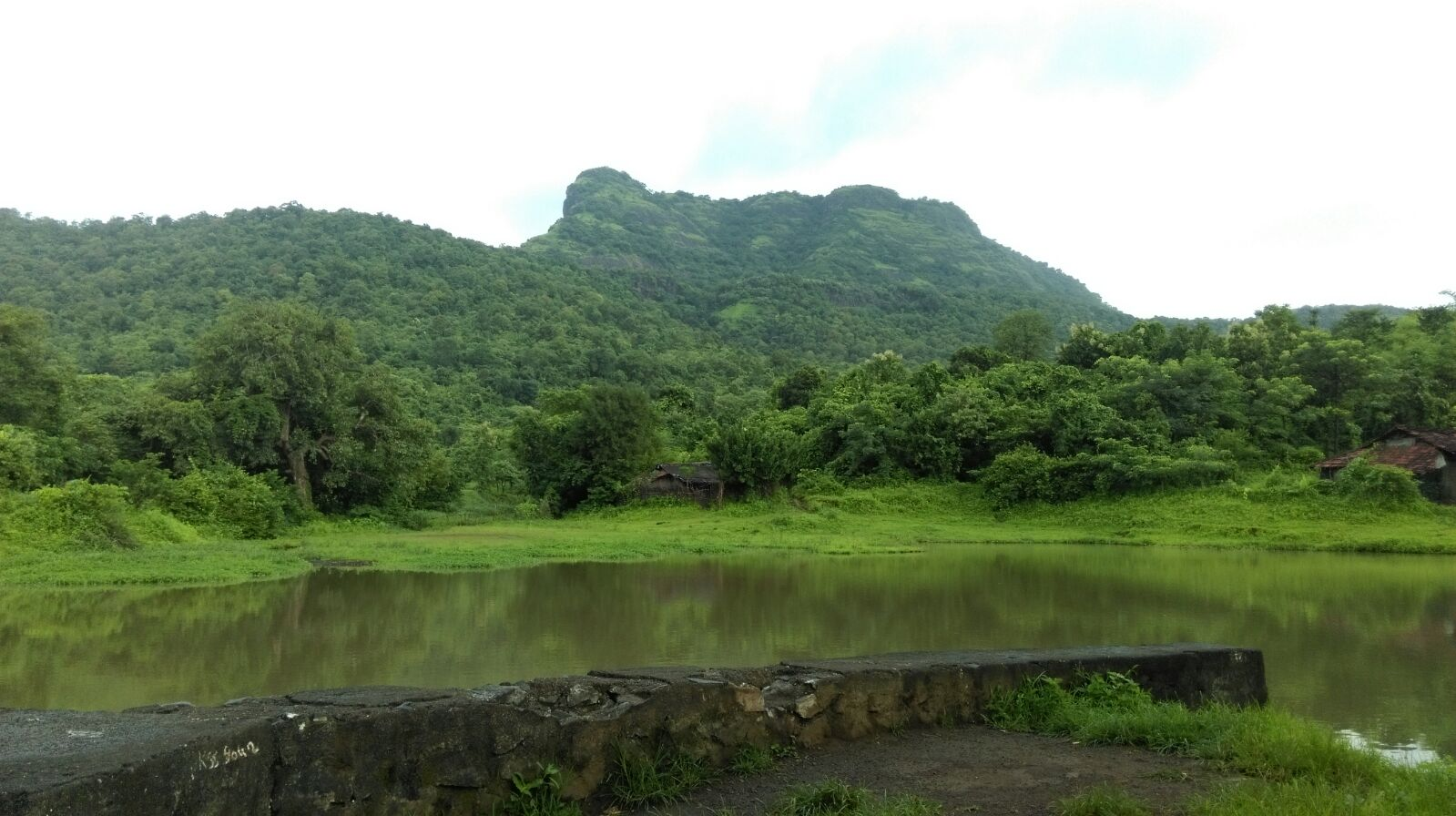
- Tandulwadi fort

Site information
- Type: Hill fort
- Owner: Government of India
- Controlled by: Gujarat (1521-1557); Portugal (1557-1737); Maratha Empire (1739-1818); United Kingdom: East India Company (1818-1857); British Raj (1857-1947); India (1947-)
- Open to the public: Yes
- Condition: Ruins

Location
- Tandulwadi Fort
- Coordinates: 19°37′01.1″N 72°50′30.2″E
- Height: 579 metres (1,900 ft)

Site history
- Materials: Stone

Tandulwadi Fort is located near Saphale, 104 km north of Mumbai. Tandulwadi is not a fully built up fort, but a series of structures spread over the top of the mountain. The fort dates back 800 years and was primarily used as a watch tower over the surrounding plains. At a height of 1524 feet, it has views of the surrounding towns of Saphale, the Zanzorli lake, and the confluence of the Surya and Vaitarna rivers.

== Location ==
The fort is located near Lalthane village in Palghar district, about 104 km from Mumbai, 75 km from Thane and 7.5 km from Saphale railway station. It is also reachable through the Mumbai - Ahmedabad Highway NH 8. Upon reaching Varai Phata you have to take a left turn after crossing the bridge over Vaitarna river. A few minutes drive on this road and one can see the Tandulwadi fort on the front hillocks. Tandulwadi village is 15 km from the Varai Phata. There are no hotels or restaurants in the village except a few grocery shops. Tandulwadi village is well connected by road. Tandulwadi village is a small Varli tribal village. Nowadays Forest Department is making steps to go to the fort from Pimplapada (Lalthane). Lalthane waterfall situated just under the fort and is a popular attraction during the rainy season.

== History ==
The first known history of the fort was in the 15th century (about 1429) during the rule of Jafar Khan, son of Ahmed Shah of the Gujarat Sultanate. It was used as a reconnoiter fort to keep a watch on neighboring forts and the Arabian Sea. In 1454, the Sultan of Ahmedabad captured (Mahikavati - Mahim) situated in Palghar District and one of his Sardar named Mallik Allauddin was made chief of Tandulwadi fort. In 1557, the Portuguese took the fort after they wrested Diu from the Gujarat and established a stronghold at the nearby Vasai area, where they built the Vasai Fort. The Portuguese lost control of the area to the Marathas in 1737 after the battle of Bassein.

== Hiking ==
Tandulwadi has a moderately difficult gradient and it takes about a half hours to reach the main plateau from Tandulwadi village which is situated at the base of the fort. To reach the highest point it takes another one hour. The height of the fort is about 1524 feet.

Upon reaching the main plateau, one can find several rock cut water cisterns. There are no bastions, walls or houses on the fort. There is no evidence of fortification except for a small stone wall on the southern side. A small water pond is situated in the center.

From the top of the fort are seen Kohoj fort, Takmak fort, Asheri fort, Mahalaxmi pinnacle and the Arabian sea.

== Accommodation ==
There is no residing place on the fort. Overnight accommodation can be found in the primary school in the village.

== Gallery ==
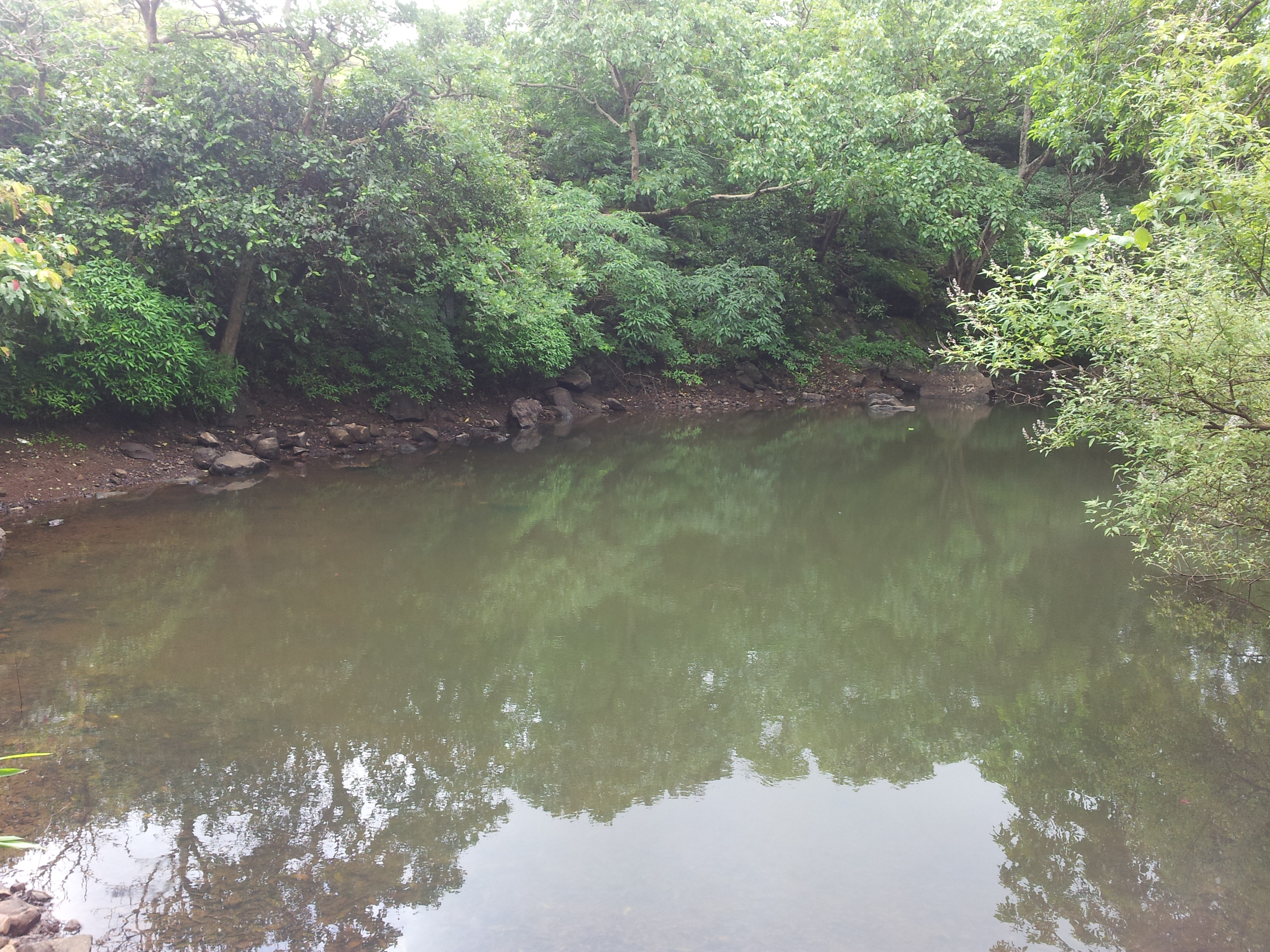
Pond on the fort

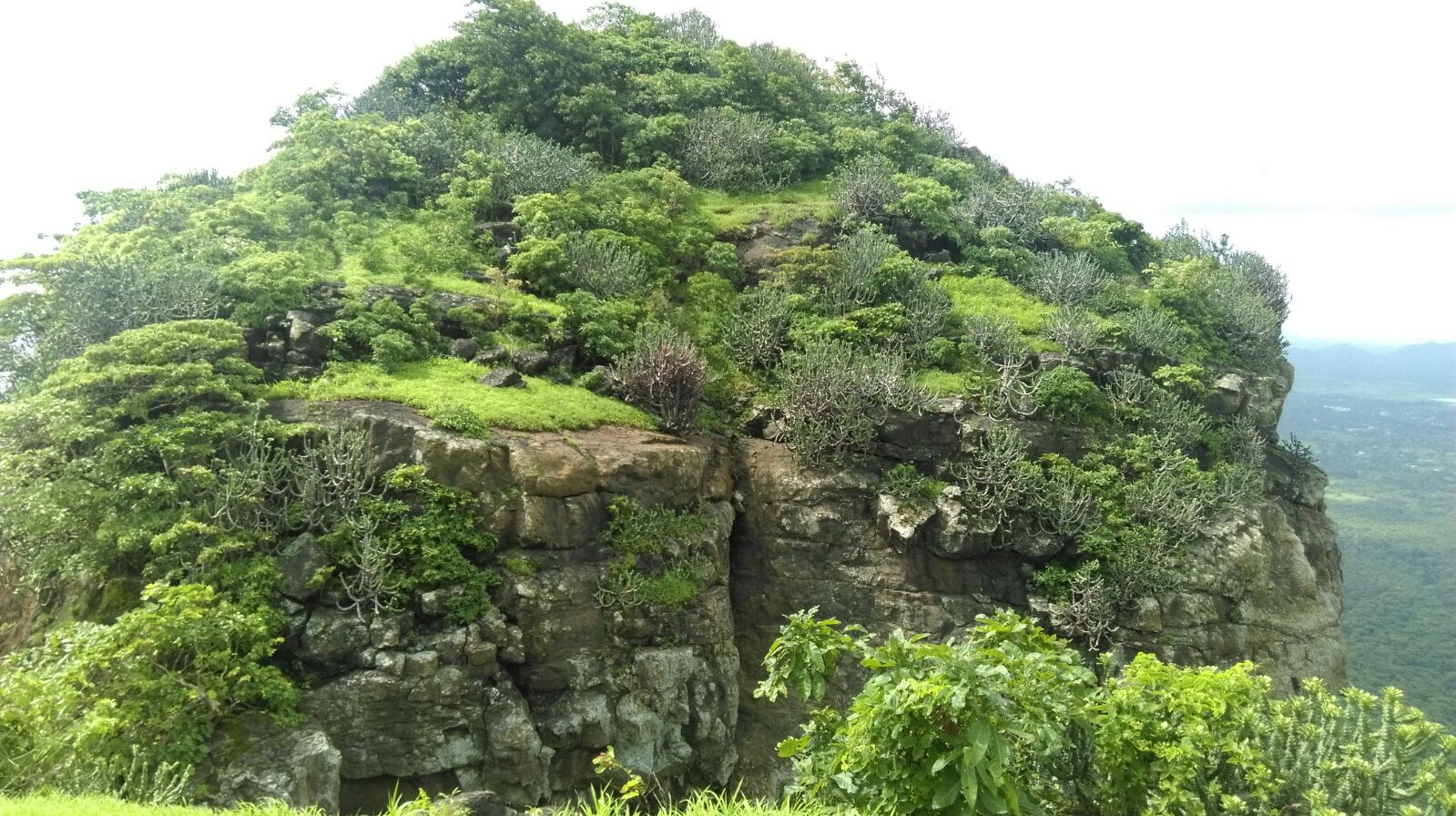
Steep hills

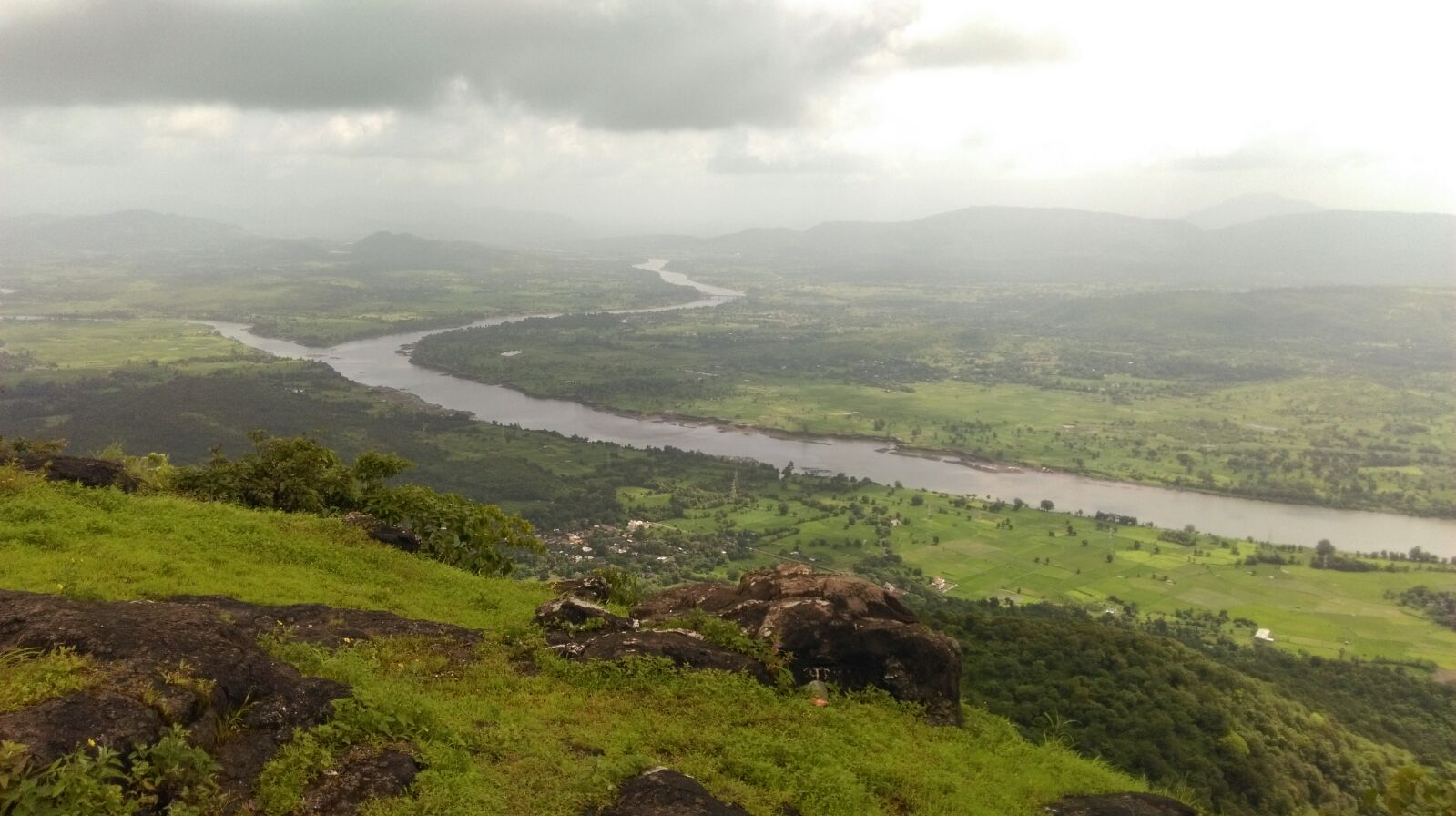
Vaitarna river from the fort

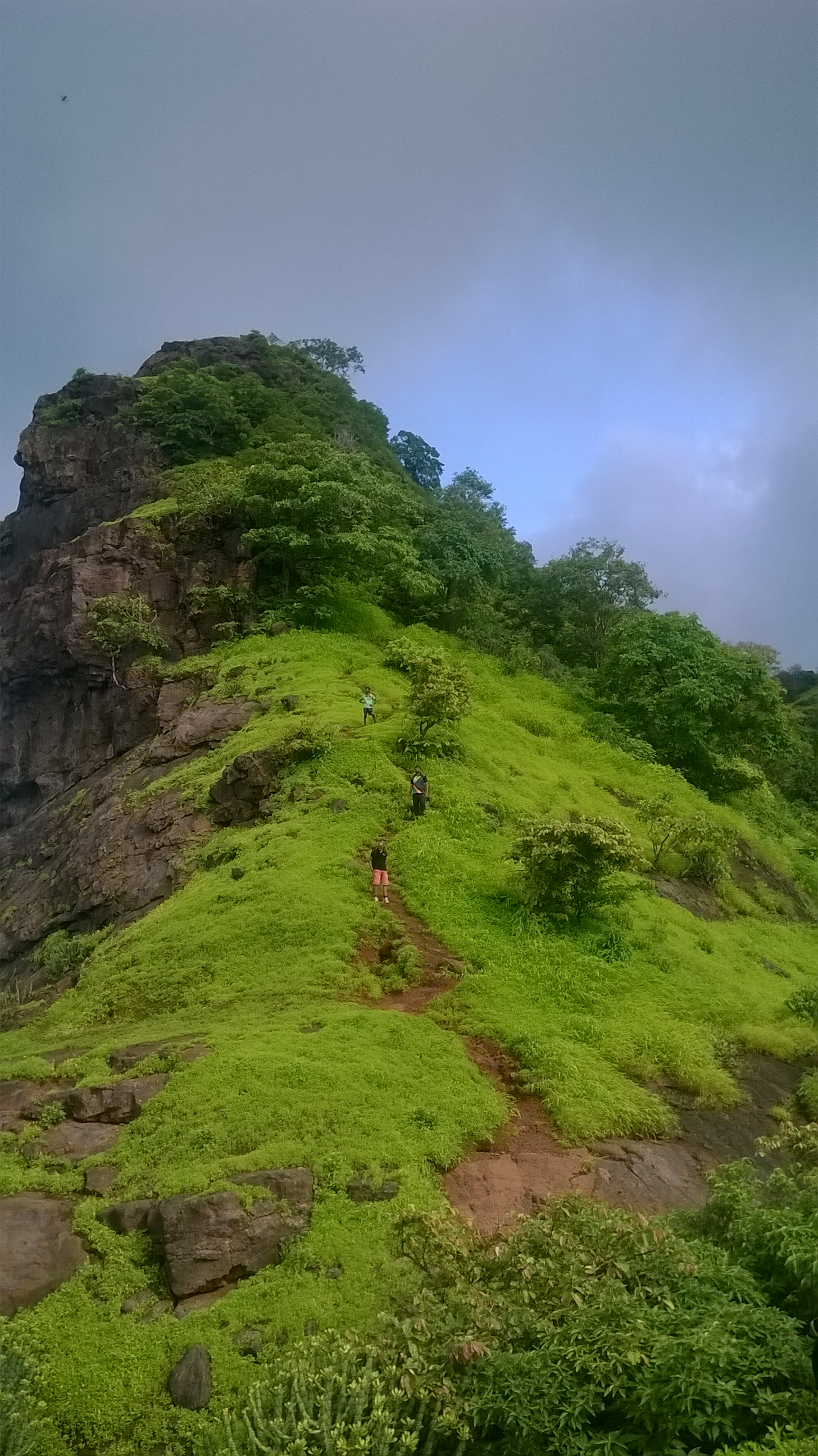
Trek path

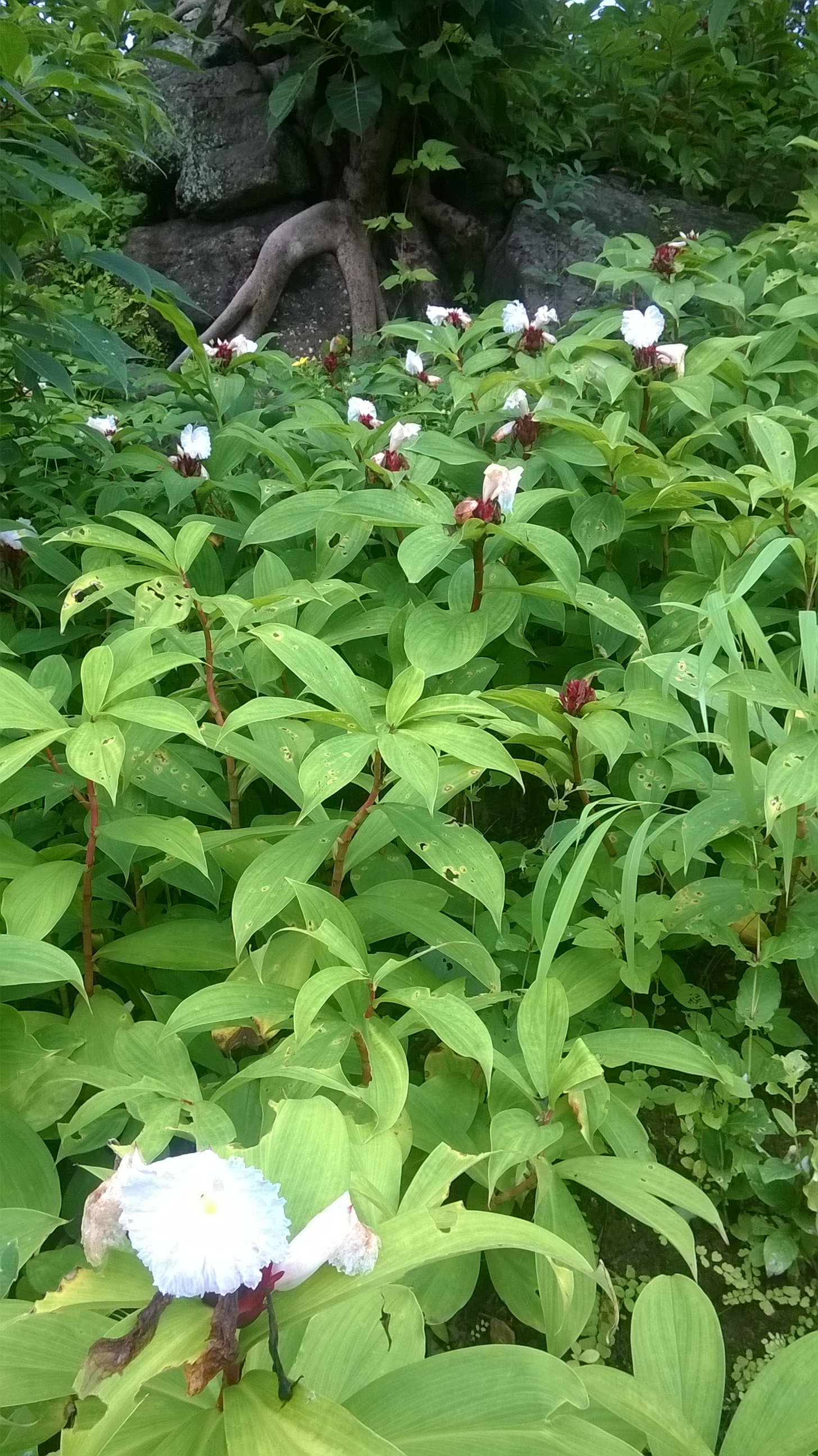
Wild flowers on the fort

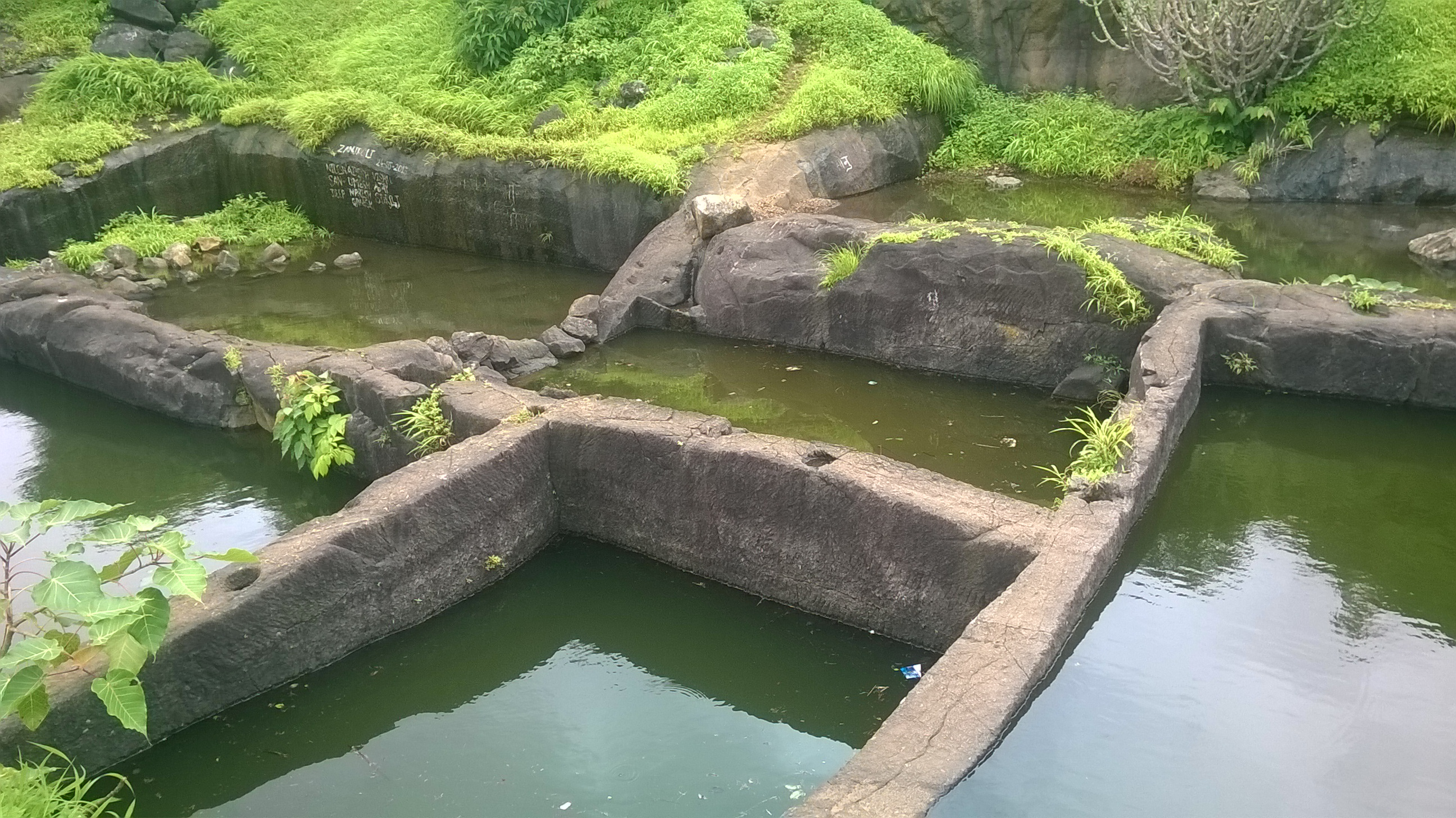
Rockcut water cistern

== See also ==
- List of forts in Maharashtra
- List of forts in India
- Marathi People
- Maratha Navy
- List of Maratha dynasties and states
- Maratha War of Independence
- Battles involving the Maratha Empire
- Maratha Army
- Maratha titles
- Military history of India
