= Neeraj Grover murder case =

2008 TV executive murder in Mumbai, India

Neeraj Grover
- Born: 23 February 1982; Kishni
- Died: 7 May 2008 (aged 26); Bombay
- Cause of death: Homicide
- Body discovered: Amgaon village in Manor, Maharashtra
- Resting place: Mumbai
- Citizenship: India
- Education: Degree in Mass Communication
- Occupation: TVexecutive
- Employer: Synergy Adlabs
- Notable work: Kya Aap Paanchvi Pass Se Tez Hain?
- Parent(s): Amarnath Grover and Neelam Grover

Neeraj Grover was a television executive working for Synergy Adlabs, a Mumbai based production house. He was found dead in May 2008, a crime for which actress Maria Susairaj and her boyfriend Lieutenant Emile Jerome Mathew were arrested. Mathew was eventually found guilty of culpable homicide not amounting to murder and for destroying evidence. Susairaj was acquitted of the killing itself, but found guilty of destroying evidence. The killing and subsequent trial received significant press coverage in India.

== Background ==
Maria Susairaj was a new and small-time South Indian film actress and Lieutenant Emil Jerome Mathew was her boyfriend. Both were said to be getting engaged two months later. Neeraj Grover was helping Susairaj to establish a foothold in the television industry and had also arranged few auditions for her. Susairaj had once told Mathew that Grover had a crush on her but she did not reciprocate. She had reportedly also stayed at Grover's apartment for a few days. At the time of the incident, Susairaj was moving into her new rented apartment and Grover was helping her with the move.

On 6 May 2008, Grover reportedly went to meet Susairaj and was never found again. When his friends and family could not trace him for over 24 hours, his family filed a missing person's report. Grover's family told police that they suspected the involvement of his female friend in his disappearance.

Susairaj, when questioned police claimed that though Grover had met her on Tuesday night, he left at 12 A.M. to meet some friends for a party in Andheri. As per various media reports, and as stated by the police, Susairaj continued fabricating stories for 10 days, until she eventually told the police that Mathew had killed Grover in her presence.

== Killing and immediate aftermath ==
Grover visited Susairaj's Malad apartment Dhiraj Solitaire at 22:00 on 6 May to help her settle in. At the same time, Mathew called her up and got upset to hear a male voice in background. When Susairaj told Mathew that Grover had come over to help her, Jerome asked Maria not to allow Neeraj to stay overnight. Mathew at that time was living in Kochi. However, he took a flight and came to Mumbai the next day without telling Susairaj. He reached her apartment at 07:30. Susairaj opened the door and Mathew went straight into the bedroom to find Grover in the room. As per media and police reports, the two men had argument and then engaged in a physical fight. Mathew grabbed a kitchen knife and stabbed Grover, who died on the spot.

On 25 May, the crime branch recovered a nine-inch knife from Susairaj's apartment complex. Police believed that the knife was used to kill Grover.

Around 11:00 am the same day, Susairaj went to a nearby mall and purchased bags, air freshener, curtains, bed sheets & knife. She later told police that she did this on Jerome's instructions.

They both then took the dead body to the kitchen and chopped it into several pieces, stuffing them into the bags Susairaj had earlier bought. While many media outlets reported that Grover's body had been chopped into 300 pieces, the judge in the case would later state that this was "...far from the facts on record", and that such a description had caused "confusion" and had "outraged the general public".

Susairaj borrowed a car from her friend and dumped the bags in the vehicle's boot whilst the building security guard watched them load the car. At 16:30 the same day, they drove towards Manor after buying two bottles of Petrol at Bhayander. They soaked the bags in petrol and set it on fire in a jungle near Amgaon village in Manor. After burning the dead body, they returned to Mumbai the same night at 21:30.

== Leads to prime suspects ==
Some circumstances leading police to arrest Mathew and Susairaj included the following:

=== Accidentally answering a call ===
Maria Susairaj, along with Jerome Mathew, on her way to Manor in a friend's borrowed car (to dispose of Grover's body) accidentally answered a call on Grover's mobile while she was pulling it out of her denim pocket to see who the caller was. She had kept Grover's mobile with her after the murder. Although she immediately disconnected the call, police were able to trace the location at which the call was answered. This turned out to be a key lead for police as Susairaj, during questioning before her arrest, had told the police that she was shopping in Dadar when she was actually on her way to Manor.

=== Lying about borrowed car ===
Susairaj had initially told police that she borrowed a Hyundai Santro from Mathew's friend "Jitesh" for going out shopping. Jitesh was a Colaba-based Naval Officer and was at sea at the time of the incident. Susairaj requested Jitesh to stand by her if the police questioned him. It was stated that Jitesh refused to lie as his travel records would prove otherwise. Susairaj then admitted to the police that she lied for personal reasons and it was then she revealed the true name of the car owner: Kiran Shreyas. Shreyas told the police that Susairaj had borrowed the car saying she wanted to go to Dadar for shopping with Mathew

Police later brought the car, car owner & witnesses to the police station where Susairaj broke down and gave her version of the crime, up to and including the disposal of the body.

=== Answering a friend's call ===
One of Grover's friends called up on his mobile and Susairaj answered the call. She mumbled that Neeraj had "gone out" forgetting his cell phone with her. The friend later came and picked up the cell phone a couple of days later. This act of Susairaj also made her a prime suspect.

=== 1,000 calls in 13 Days ===
Crime branch found out that Mathew had called Susairaj nearly 1,000 times between 7 and 20 May 2008. The Crime Branch got suspicious and questioned Susairaj.

== Investigation Lapses ==
=== Weapon ===
The knife, which was thrown into a garbage chute, was not recovered for several days despite police searching the house several times. However, they had earlier sent a couple of seized knife for forensic tests to look for DNA samples. The tests turned out to be negative.

=== Naval Training ===
On 8 May 2008, Mathew was called for questioning by the Malad police. He told them he had come to Mumbai for a Naval training session. The police did not verify his claim with the naval authorities.

=== Bloodstains ignored ===
Mathew and Susairaj had repainted a wall to hide the bloodstains. Malad police did not ask them why one wall was coloured differently from the rest.

== The verdict ==
Maria Monica Susairaj was found not guilty of the killing, but guilty of destroying evidence and was sentenced to a maximum three years' imprisonment. She was released the following day with time served.

Jerome Mathew was found guilty of culpable homicide not amounting murder and of destroying evidence. He was sentenced to 10 years in prison for the killing, and 3 years for destroying evidence. The sentences will be served concurrently, with 3 years time served already applied.

The court has also fined Susairaj and Mathew ₹50,000, to be paid to Neeraj Grover's family.

== Aftermath ==
Various outlets of the national press of India reported public outrage on what was considered a light verdict given the accused had chopped the body into hundreds of pieces after murder. In News channel NDTV decried the defamation of the accused, claiming they were under lot of stress. The national news outlets wrote particularly scathing indictments of the actress following the verdict. Times Now called her the "Lady Macbeth of the Grover case ... (who) has gone an extreme length to feed her ambition even if it means putting her jilted lover in the dock and moreover taking the life of an innocent." Attorneys for both the convicted parties as well as the prosecution announced their intentions to file appeals.

== Depiction in film ==
Not a Love Story, with different names for actual people.

== See also ==
- Adnan Patrawala Murder Case
- Auto Shankar
- Charles Shobraj
- Geeta and Sanjay Chopra kidnapping case
- Joshi-Abhyankar serial murders
- Murder of Jessica Lal
- Nirupama Pathak death case
- Nitish Katara murder case
- Noida double murder case
- Noida serial murders
- Raman Raghav
- Schizophrenia
- Serial killer
- Murder of Snehal Gaware
- Stoneman
- Law of India
