= Ketkar =

Ketkar or Ketakar may refer to:

- Shridhar Venkatesh Ketkar, a scholar of the Marathi language
- Tejashree Pradhan Ketkar (born 1988), Marathi television and film actress
- Venkatesh P. Ketakar, an astronomer who in 1911 proposed the existence of a trans-Neptunian planet, now disproven
- Katkar, a census town in Thane district in the Indian state of Maharashtra
