= Not a Love Story (2011 film) =

Not A Love Story
- Theatrical release poster
- Directed by: Ram Gopal Varma
- Story by: Nitish Sharma
- Produced by: Nitish Sharma; Shailesh R Singh; Kiran Kumar Koneru
- Starring: Mahie Gill; Deepak Dobriyal; Nitish Sharma; Ajay Gehi
- Cinematography: Sapan Narula; Harshraj Shroff; M. Ravichandra Thevar
- Edited by: Abhijit Kokate; Vinay Chauhan; Jimmy Thomas
- Music by: Sandeep Chowta
- Distributed by: Bohra Bros Prod. Pvt. Ltd.
- Release date: 19 August 2011
- Running time: 100 minutes
- Country: India
- Language: Hindi
- Budget: 80 lacs

Not A Love Story is a 2011 Indian Hindi-language crime thriller film inspired by the murder of Neeraj Grover in 2008 that led to the arrest of Emile Jerome Mathew and Maria Susairaj. Starring Mahie Gill, Deepak Dobriyal and Ajay Gehi and directed by Ram Gopal Varma, the film was released on 19 August 2011. Ram Gopal Varma has announced that the film is not a biopic but is inspired by the case.

The film's shooting was completed in 20 days. One of the prime locations was the building Dheeraj Solitaire where Neeraj Grover was allegedly murdered in 2008. It marked Rasika Joshi's posthumous film after her demise on 7 July 2011.

== Cast ==
- Mahie Gill as Anusha Chawla (based on Maria Susairaj)
- Deepak Dobriyal as Robin Fernandes, Anusha's boyfriend (based on Lieutenant Emil Jerome Mathew, Maria's boyfriend)
- Ajay Gehi as Ashish Bhatnagar
- Zakir Hussain as Inspector Mane
- Neil Bhoopalam as Prem
- Darshan Jariwala as Anusha's lawyer
- Ganesh Yadav as Robin's lawyer
- Rasika Joshi as Ashish's mother
- Prabhleen Sandhu as Anju
- Urmila Matondkar as Item number
- Mahesh Thakur as ad-film maker Sam in a guest role
- Sandesh Jadhav as Inspector Chavan
- Dimple Ghosh as Richa
- Rakesh Kukreti as Prashant
- Abhijeet Lahiri as Ashish's father
- Nandita Puri as Anusha's mother
- Vandana Sajnani as Apeksha, Director
- Sushma Bhagwat as Robin's mother
- Ashok Awasthi as Robin's father
- Shankar Sachdev as Public Prosecutor
- Kamal Adip as Judge
- Rajesh Barsewal as watchman
- Sandeep Bose as Kishen, Producer

== Plot ==
Standing at 5'6", Chandigarh-born Anusha Chawla bids adieu to her boyfriend, Robin Fernandes, and relocates to Mumbai to act in movies. Weeks later she manages to meet a filmmaker, Sam, who assures her of a lead role on the condition that she become intimate with him, but she walks away. She meets with more disappointment when a movie with Richa gets shelved. Disappointed, she nevertheless continues to audition - encouraged by her new friends, Anju and Prashant - while Robin urges her to return home. She then meets with Ashish Bhatnagar, who puts her on a shortlist, eventually gets approval, and signs her in a lead role. Both celebrate in a pub, get intoxicated, and end up in bed in her Malad flat. The next day, a delighted Robin, happy with her success, attends her residence to congratulate and surprise her, is enraged at Ashish, and kills him. He subsequently cuts the latter's body into small pieces, and the duo borrows Prashant's car, drives to an isolated spot in Dahisar, and burns it. Before returning home, Robin instructs her not to tell anyone that he is in Mumbai. Days later, Prashant, Anju, and she attend Malad Police Station and notify Inspector Mane that Ashish is missing. After obtaining statements from the trio, the police launch an investigation to try and locate Ashish. Eventually, Mane suspects Anusha, summons her, questions and tortures her, she confesses, and is arrested. Robin is also subsequently arrested and brought to Mumbai, and both are produced in court.

== Music ==
1. "Yayi Re Yayi Re, Hoja Rangeela Re" - Tarannum Mallik
2. "Jab Se Mai Choti Thi" - Sandeep Patil, Dharmaraj Bhatt
3. "Yayi Re Yayi Re, Hoja Rangeela Re" (Sad) - Tarannum Mallik
4. "Jab Se Mai Choti Thi" (Sad) - Sandeep Patil, Dharmaraj Bhatt
5. "Woh Ek Pal Chhina Kal" - Arijit Datta, Neha Kakkar

== Reception ==
=== Critical response ===
The critics' response has been positive to mixed. Taran Adarsh of Bollywood Hungama gave 4 stars out of 5. Subhash K Jha gave 3.5 out of 5. Kaveree Bamzai of India Today gave 3 out of 5. Raja Sen of Rediff rated it 1.5 out of 5, saying that it is a film made in bad taste. Harish of Behindwoods rated it 2 out of 5 and said "Overall in the time of stylish filmmaking of no substance movies, RGV tries to differ but with such a wafer-thin but powerful plot-line, you expect the background music, editing and camera work to push it to greatness and that is where the movie falters."

Mayank Shekhar of the Hindustan Times said "it delves deeper into neither the young dream-chasers of a scary celeb industry nor chilling procedurals of an infamous police case", and rated it 2 out of 5. CNN-IBN's Rajeev Masand said "Not A Love Story' is not entirely unwatchable", rating it 2 out of 5, but asserted that it is the "most senseless movie made in Bollywood for a long time." Nupur Barua of fullhyd.com rated it 6/10 and said you can watch the movie if you can digest, visually, blood, gore, violent sex, and constant shaky camera movement.

== See also ==
- Neeraj Grover murder case
