= Bahare =

Village in Maharashtra

- village
- Location in Maharashtra, India Bahare (India)
- Coordinates: 20.0432337°N 72.8781322°E
- Country: India
- State: Maharashtra
- District: Palghar
- Taluka: Dahanu
- Elevation: 64 m (210 ft)

Population (2011)
  - Total: 2,294
- Time zone: UTC+5:30 (IST)
- 2011 census code: 551643

Bahare is a village in the Palghar district of Maharashtra, India. It is located in the Dahanu taluka.

== Demographics ==
According to the 2011 census of India, Bahare has 442 households. The effective literacy rate (i.e. the literacy rate of population excluding children aged 6 and below) is 40.59%.

Demographics (2011 Census)
	Total	Male	Female
Population	2294	1152	1142
Children aged below 6 years	397	213	184
Scheduled caste	0	0	0
Scheduled tribe	2278	1144	1134
Literates	770	495	275
Workers (all)	1223	601	622
Main workers (total)	803	413	390
Main workers: Cultivators	620	329	291
Main workers: Agricultural labourers	134	49	85
Main workers: Household industry workers	0	0	0
Main workers: Other	49	35	14
Marginal workers (total)	420	188	232
Marginal workers: Cultivators	90	39	51
Marginal workers: Agricultural labourers	312	134	178
Marginal workers: Household industry workers	0	0	0
Marginal workers: Others	18	15	3
Non-workers	1071	551	520
