= Ganjad =

Village in Maharashtra

- village
- Location in Maharashtra, India Ganjad (India)
- Coordinates: 19.950231°N 72.8682201°E
- Country: India
- State: Maharashtra
- District: Palghar
- Taluka: Dahanu
- Elevation: 51 m (167 ft)

Population (2011)
  - Total: 1,966
- Time zone: UTC+5:30 (IST)
- 2011 census code: 551685

Ganjad is a village in the Palghar district of Maharashtra, India. It is located in the Dahanu taluka.

== Demographics ==
According to the 2011 census of India, Ganjad has 367 households. The effective literacy rate (i.e. the literacy rate of population excluding children aged 6 and below) is 61.48%.

Demographics (2011 Census)
| | Total | Male | Female |
|---|---|---|---|
| Population | 1966 | 954 | 1012 |
| Children aged below 6 years | 289 | 141 | 148 |
| Scheduled caste | 1 | 0 | 1 |
| Scheduled tribe | 1782 | 862 | 920 |
| Literates | 1031 | 575 | 456 |
| Workers (all) | 695 | 387 | 308 |
| Main workers (total) | 364 | 263 | 101 |
| Main workers: Cultivators | 127 | 99 | 28 |
| Main workers: Agricultural labourers | 89 | 49 | 40 |
| Main workers: Household industry workers | 24 | 18 | 6 |
| Main workers: Other | 124 | 97 | 27 |
| Marginal workers (total) | 331 | 124 | 207 |
| Marginal workers: Cultivators | 17 | 13 | 4 |
| Marginal workers: Agricultural labourers | 280 | 96 | 184 |
| Marginal workers: Household industry workers | 7 | 3 | 4 |
| Marginal workers: Others | 27 | 12 | 15 |
| Non-workers | 1271 | 567 | 704 |
