= Pasthal =

- Census town
- Location in Maharashtra, India
- Coordinates: 19.8108°N 72.7277°E
- Country: India
- State: Maharashtra
- District: palghar

Population (2001)
  - Total: 16,185

Languages
  - Official: Marathi
- Time zone: UTC+5:30 (IST)
- Postal code: 401504

Pasthal is a census town in Palghar district in the Indian state of Maharashtra.

== Demographics ==
As of 2001 India census, Pasthal had a population of 16,185. Males constitute 53% of the population and females 47%. Pasthal has an average literacy rate of 82%, higher than the national average of 59.5%: male literacy is 86%, and female literacy is 79%. In Pasthal, 13% of the population is under 6 years of age.
