= Mokhada =

Town in Maharashtra, India

- town
- Location in Maharashtra, India
- Coordinates: 19°56′N 73°20′E
- Country: India
- State: Maharashtra
- District: Palghar

Languages
  - Official: Marathi
- Time zone: UTC+5:30 (IST)
- PIN: 401604
- ISO 3166 code: IN-MH
- Nearest city: Nashik

Mokhada is a census town in Jawhar subdivision of Palghar district of Maharashtra state in Konkan division.

villages in mokhada :
1 Adoshi
2 Amale
3 Ase
4 Beriste
5 Botoshi
6 Brahmagaon
7 Charangaon
8 Chas
9 Dandwal
10 Dhamani
11 Dhamanshet
12 Dhondmaryachimet
13 Dhudgaon
14 Dolhare
15 Ghanval
16 Ghosali
17 Gomghar
18 Gonde Bk.
19 Gonde Kh.
20 Hirve
21 Jogalwadi
22 Kaduchiwadi
23 Kalamgaon
24 Karegaon
25 Karol
26 Kashti
27 Kevanale
28 Khoch
29 Khodala
30 Kiniste
31 Kochale
32 Koshimshet
33 Kurlod
34 Lakshiminagar
35 Mokhada
36 Morhande
37 Nashera
38 Nilmati
39 Osarvira
40 Pachaghar
41 Palsunde
42 Pathardi
43 Pimpalgaon
44 Poshera
45 Rajivnagar
46 Sakhari
47 Saturly
48 Sawarde
49 Sayade
50 Shastrinagar
51 Shirasgaon
52 Shirson
53 Shivali
54 Suryamal
55 Swaminagar
56 Udhale
57 Vashind
58 Wakadpada
59 Washala
