= Salwad =

- Census Town
- Interactive map of Salwad
- Coordinates: 19°48′13″N 72°43′28″E
- Country: India
- State: Maharashtra
- District: Palghar

Population
  - Total: 10,000 estimated

Languages
  - Official: Marathi
- Time zone: UTC+5:30 (IST)

Salwad is a census town in Palghar district, Maharashtra, India. The town is located approximately 20 kilometers away from Palghar and 155 kilometers away from Thane. The town is a home to an estimated 10,000 people.

== Demographics ==
The town is a home to 10,000 people, amongst them 6,237 (approx 60 percent) are male and 4,160 (approx 40 percent) are female. Hindus form 91 percent of the total population, followed by Muslims, who form 6 percent of the total population. Male literacy is at 92.47 percent, whereas female literacy rate is 80.86 percent as per 2011 Indian Census.
