= Nirupama Pathak death case =

Nirupama Pathak was a 22-year-old woman who was found dead in her parents' house in Koderma district in the state of Jharkhand, India on April 29, 2010.

== Suspects ==
Nirupama's mother, Subha Pathak, was suspected of "honor killing" her. Nirupama's journalist boyfriend Priyabhansu Ranjan was also accused of abetting her suicide.

== Court verdict ==
Based on forensic evidence and a suicide note signed by Nirupama, the court ruled out murder.
