= Takmak fort =

Fort in Palghar, Maharashtra, India

Takmak Fort
- Palghar district, Maharashtra
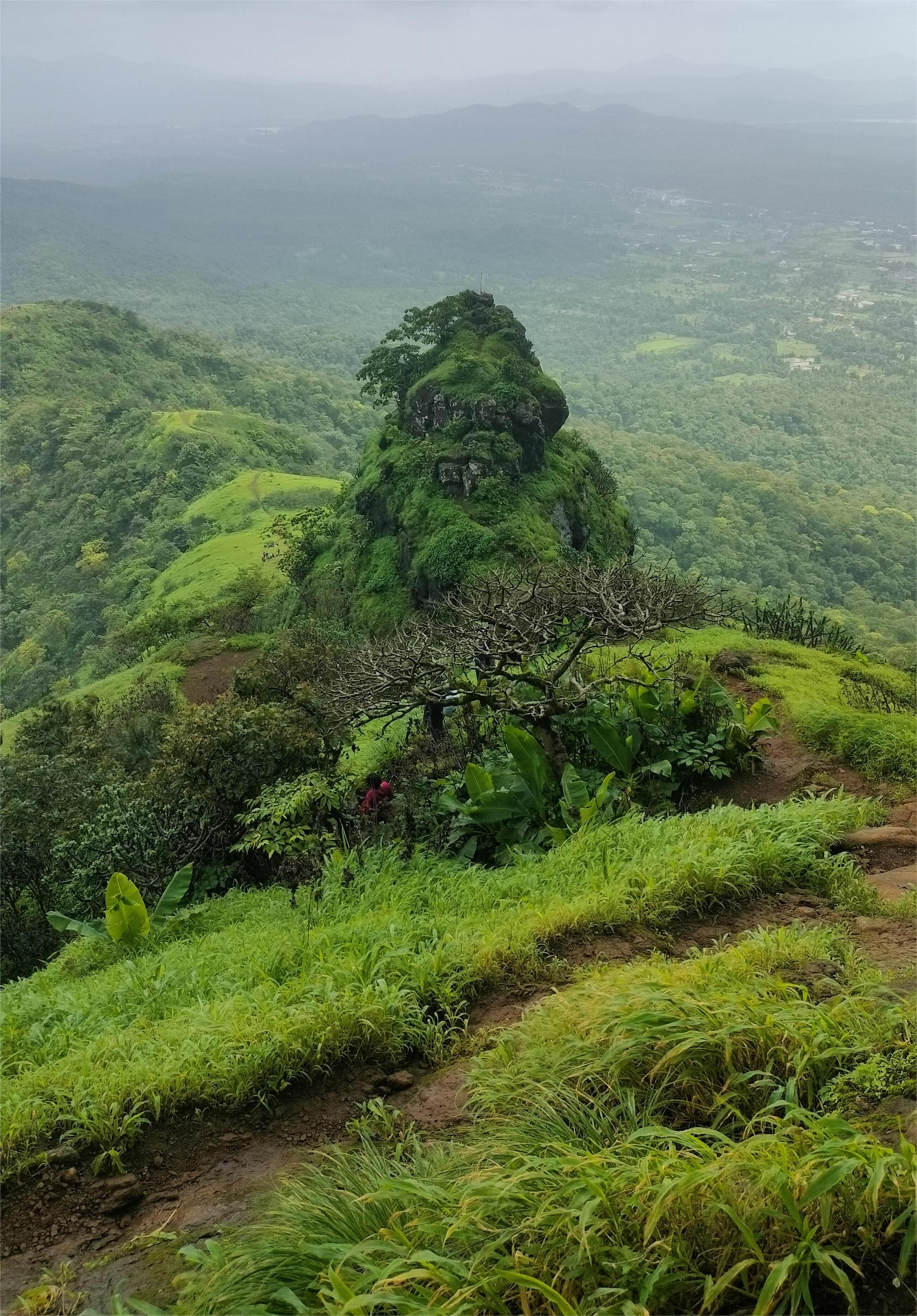
- View from Takmak's first peak

Site information
- Type: Hill fort
- Owner: Government
- Controlled by: Portugal (1594-1739); Maratha Empire (1739-1817) United Kingdom: East India Company (1817-1857); British Raj (1857-1947); India (1947-)
- Open to the public: Yes
- Condition: Ruined

Location
- Shown within Maharashtra Takmak Fort (India)
- Coordinates: 19.564076°N 72.943476°E
- Height: 1899 ft

Site history
- Materials: Basalt Stone

Takmak Fort is located in Palghar taluka of Palghar district in Maharashtra. The fort is situated on a north–south hill spur ending in a steep rise. The fort is in a ruined state with few remains of fortification. This is a fort located 60 km (37 mi) from the city of Mumbai. For some time, this fort was in the possession of the Portuguese and it was captured by Maratha army after the Battle of Vasai in 1739. It was captured by British Army in 1817.

== See also ==
- List of forts in Maharashtra
- List of forts in India
- Marathi People
