= Katkar =

- Census town
- Location in Maharashtra, India
- Coordinates: 19.816°N 72.7442°E
- Country: India
- State: Maharashtra
- District: Palghar

Population (2001)
  - Total: 6,108

Languages
  - Official: Marathi
- Time zone: UTC+5:30 (IST)

Katkar is a census town in Palghar district in the Indian state of Maharashtra.

== Demographics ==
As of 2001 India census, Katkar had a population of 6108. Males constitute 56% of the population and females 44%. Katkar has an average literacy rate of 70%, higher than the national average of 59.5%: male literacy is 78%, and female literacy is 60%. In Katkar, 23% of the population is under 6 years of age.
