= Asheri fort =

Fort in India

Asheri Fort
- अशेरीगड
- Palghar district, Maharashtra
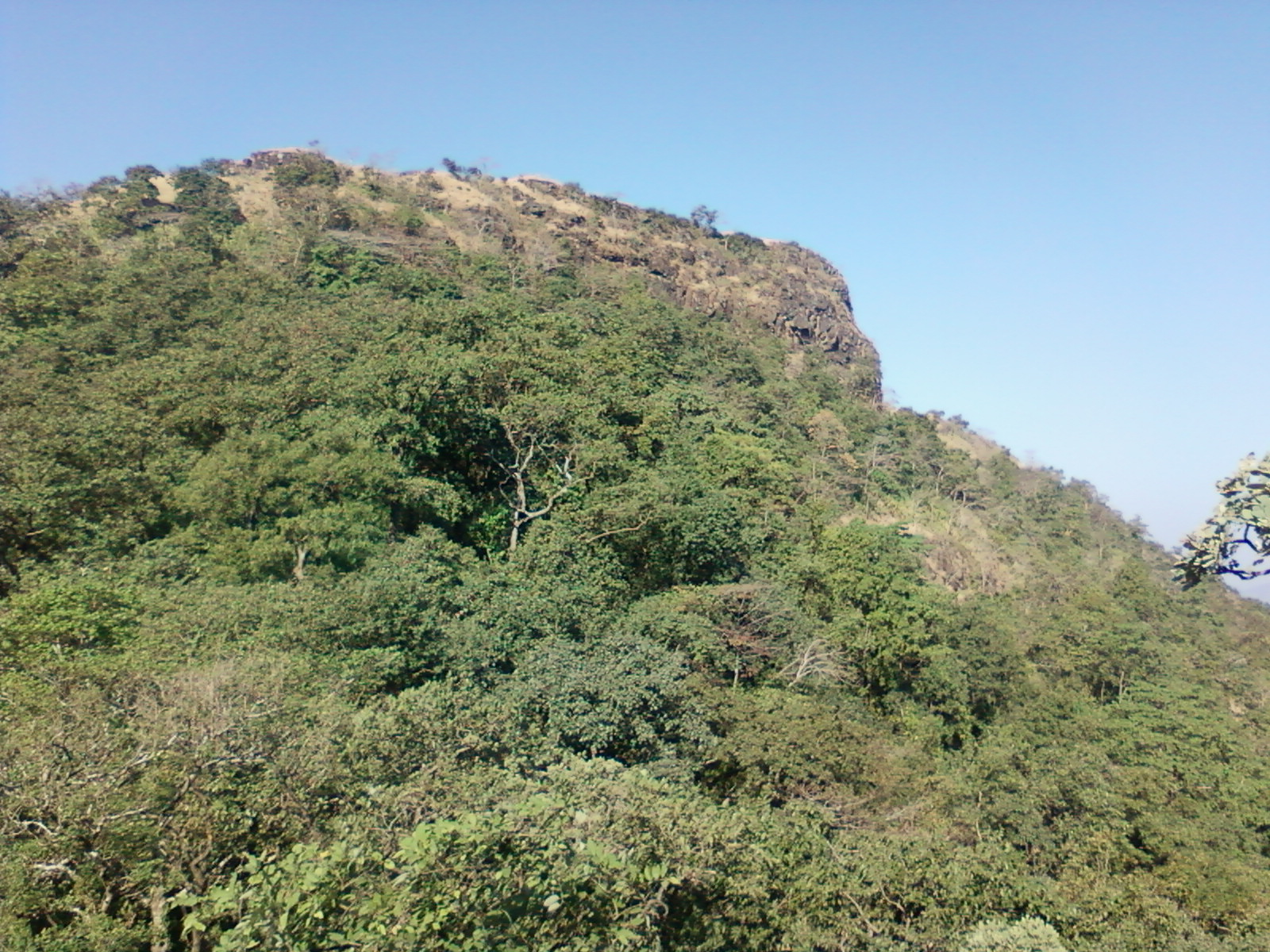
- Asheri fort from the highway

Site information
- Type: Hill fort
- Owner: Government of India
- Open to the public: Yes
- Condition: Ruins

Location
- Shown within Maharashtra
- Coordinates: 19°49′13.5″N 72°55′16″E
- Height: 1,680 ft (510 m)

Site history
- Materials: Stone

Asheri Fort / Asheri is a fort located 102 km from Mumbai and 88 km from Thane. It is in Palghar district, of Maharashtra. This fort is an important fort in Palghar district. The fort is located on the hills near Mendhavan Khind on Mumbai-Ahmedabad highway. The base village Khodkona is a small tribal village. The Fort restoration is done by the local villagers.

== History ==
This fort was built by the Bhojraja of Shilahara dynasty. This fort was captured by Bimb Raja of Mahim (Palghar) from Kolis. This fort is about 800 years old. It was ruled by Gujarat Sultanate. The Portuguese captain of Bassein, Antonio Moniz Barreto annexed the Asherigad in 1556, after bribing the Abyssinian captain who commanded the fort. Manor Fort was captured later. This fort was the northern boundary of Portuguese territory. Portuguese made it as a capital of 38 villages and 6 parishes. The fort had twenty water cisterns and two ponds. In 1737, this fort was conquered by the Maratha forces led by Chimaji Appa against Provincia do Norte, but it was reconquered in the counter-offensive by Antonio Cardim de Frois, the new General of the North. In February 1739, it fell definitely into the Maratha hands. In 1818 Captain Dickinson captured this fort and thus it went into the hands of the British East India Company.

== How to reach ==
The nearest town is Manor which is 80 km from Thane. The fort lies between Mastan naka and Charoti naka. There are local rickshaws available from either nakas to reach the base village Khodkona. There are good hotels at Mastan Naka and Charoti Naka. Now tea and snacks are also available in small hotels on the Highway. The trekking path starts from the hillock north of the Khodkona. The route is very safe and wide. There is a dense forest on the trekking route. It takes about an hour to reach the col below the fort hill. The narrow path climbing up on the eastern side of the hill leads to the entrance of the fort. The night stay on the fort can be made in the cave on the fort. The local villagers make night stay and food arrangements at a reasonable cost.

== Places to see ==
There are nothing much structures to be seen on the fort, except for the rock cut pond, which is full of lotus flowers and a cave inhabited by a sadhu.

== Gallery ==
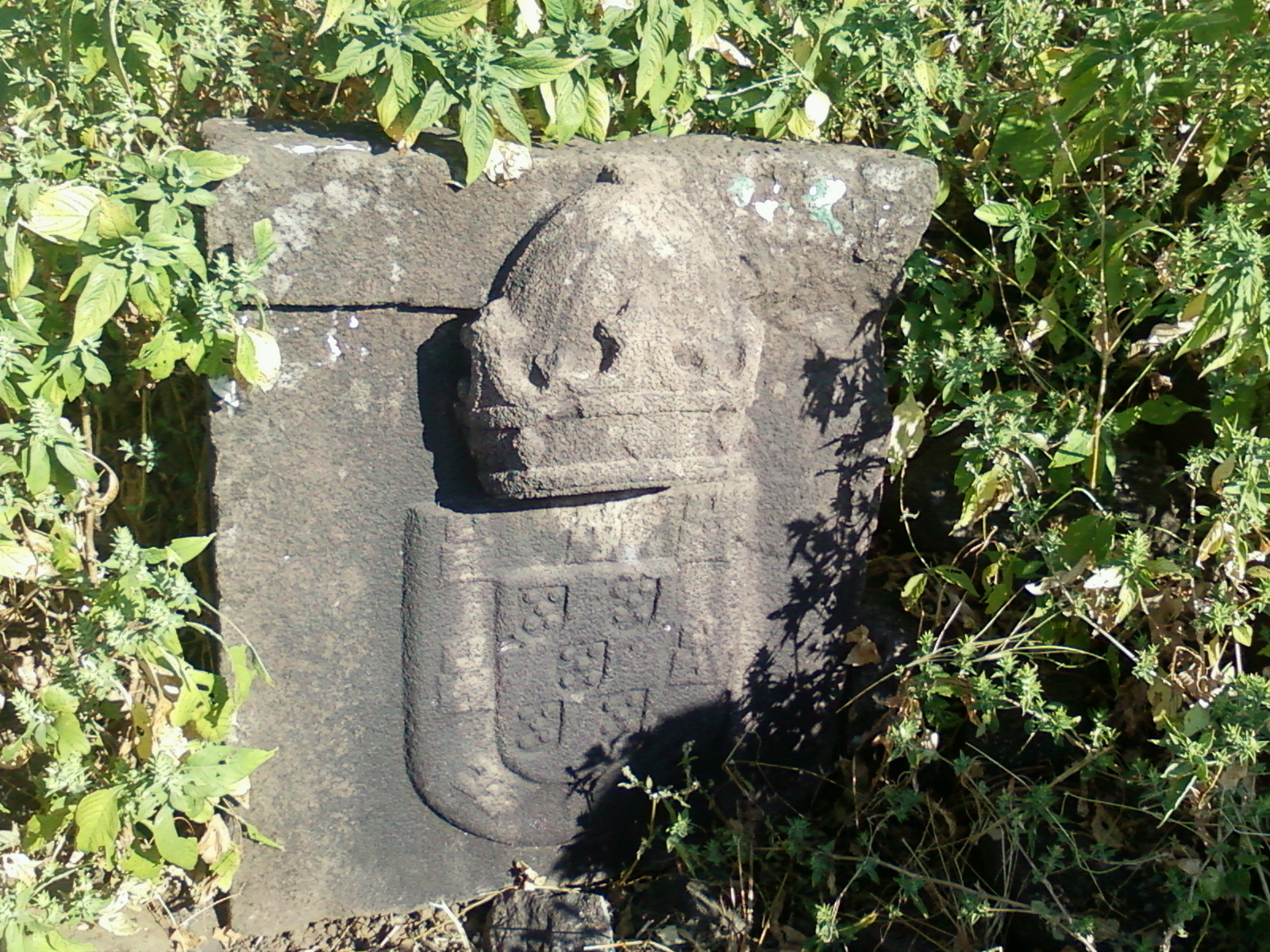
Portuguese coat of arms engraved in rock on the Fort

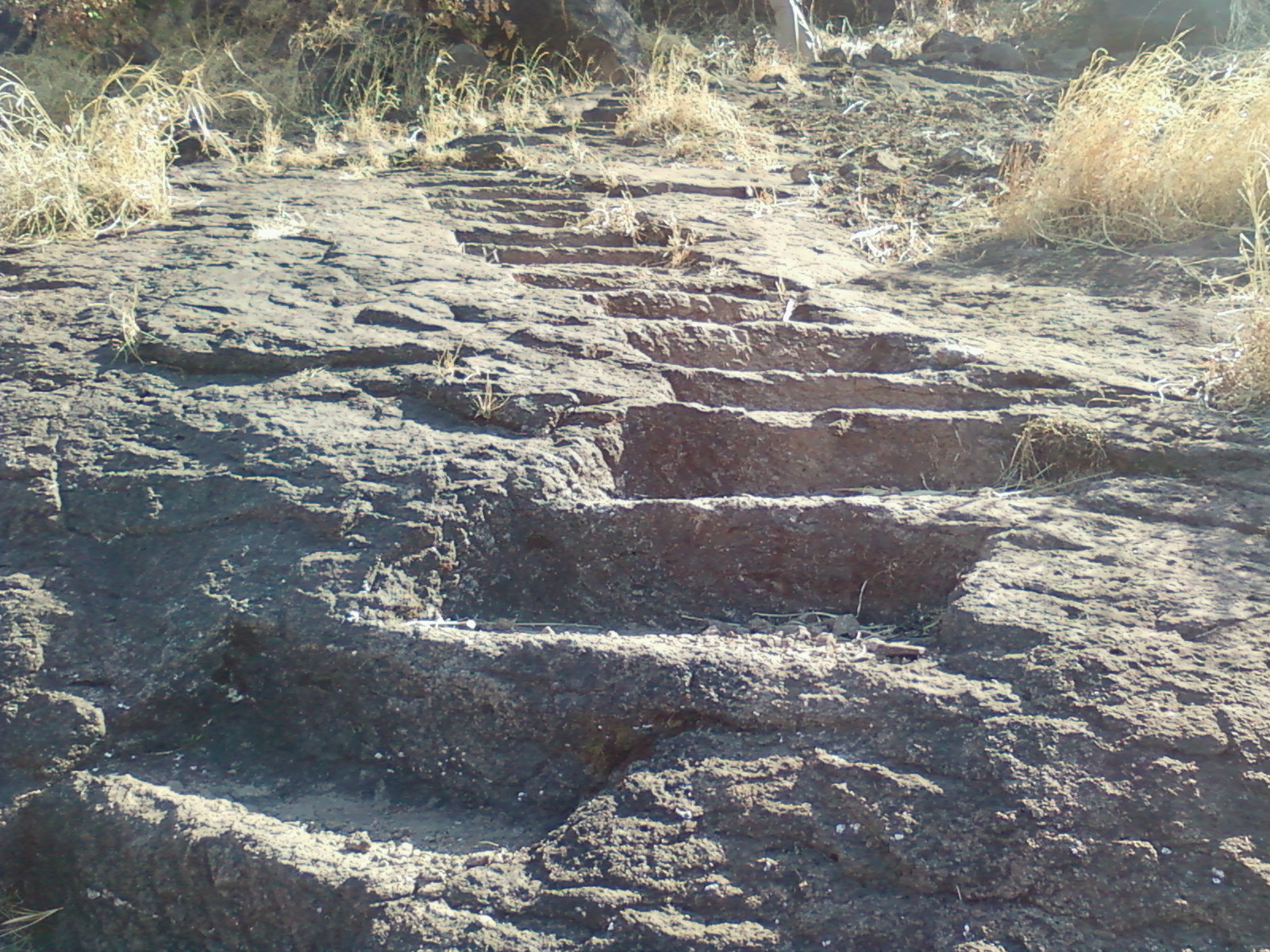
Rock cut steps on the fort

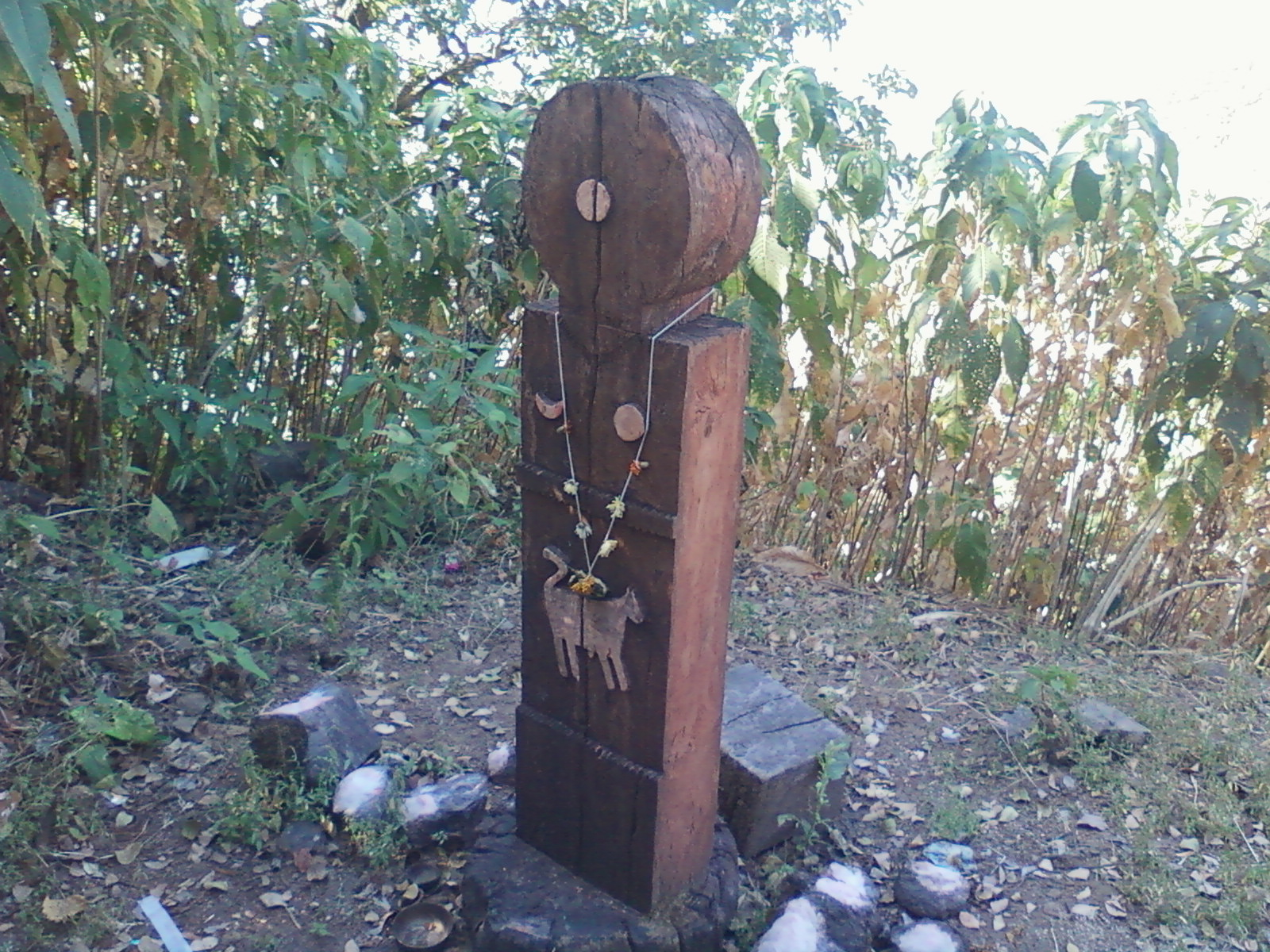
Vaghya dev tribal god

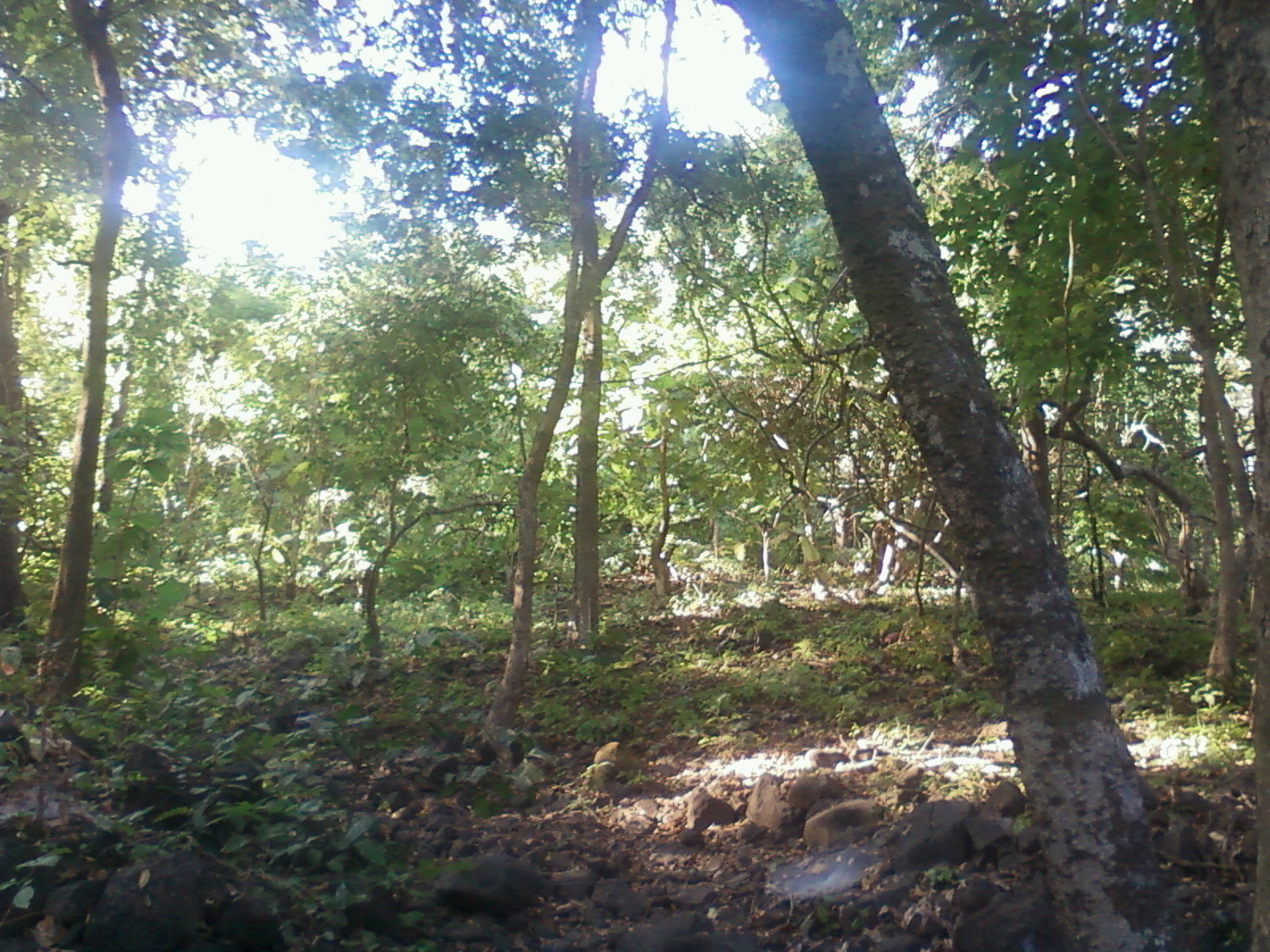
Forest below the fort

== See also ==
- List of forts in Maharashtra
- List of forts in India
- Chimaji Appa
- Marathi People
- Battles involving the Maratha Empire
- Military history of India
- Military history of Bassein
