= Manor, India =

Manor
- Census town
- Location in Maharashtra, India
- Coordinates: 19.75°N 72.92°E
- Country: India
- State: Maharashtra
- District: Palghar
- Founder: Wood traders along Surya River
- Elevation: 20 m (66 ft)

Population (2001)
  - Total: 8,345

Languages
  - Official: Marathi
- Time zone: UTC+5:30 (IST)
- Postal code: 401403

Manor is a census town in Palghar district (formerly a part of the Thane district) in the Indian state of Maharashtra.

It is located 139 kms north of Mumbai on the Mumbai-Ahmedabad National Highway (NH8) and also connects with Nashik via the Manor-Wada Road.

== History ==
Manor is mentioned as Maṇor (मणोर) in the 15th-17th century Marathi-language text Mahikavatichi Bakhar.

== Demographics ==
At the 2001 Census of India, Manor had a population of 8,345, consisting of 52% males and 48% females. The literacy rate was 68%, which was higher than the national average of 59.5%. Male literacy was 74%, and female literacy 61%. 14% of the population was under 6 years of age

By the 2011 Census of India, the population grown by about 25% to more than 10,000. Literacy rates had reached 75%, possibly due to the number of schools and colleges in the town. 6,646 (63.78%) people were identified as Hindu and 3,401 (31.32%) as Muslim.
