= Palghar district =

- District of Maharashtra
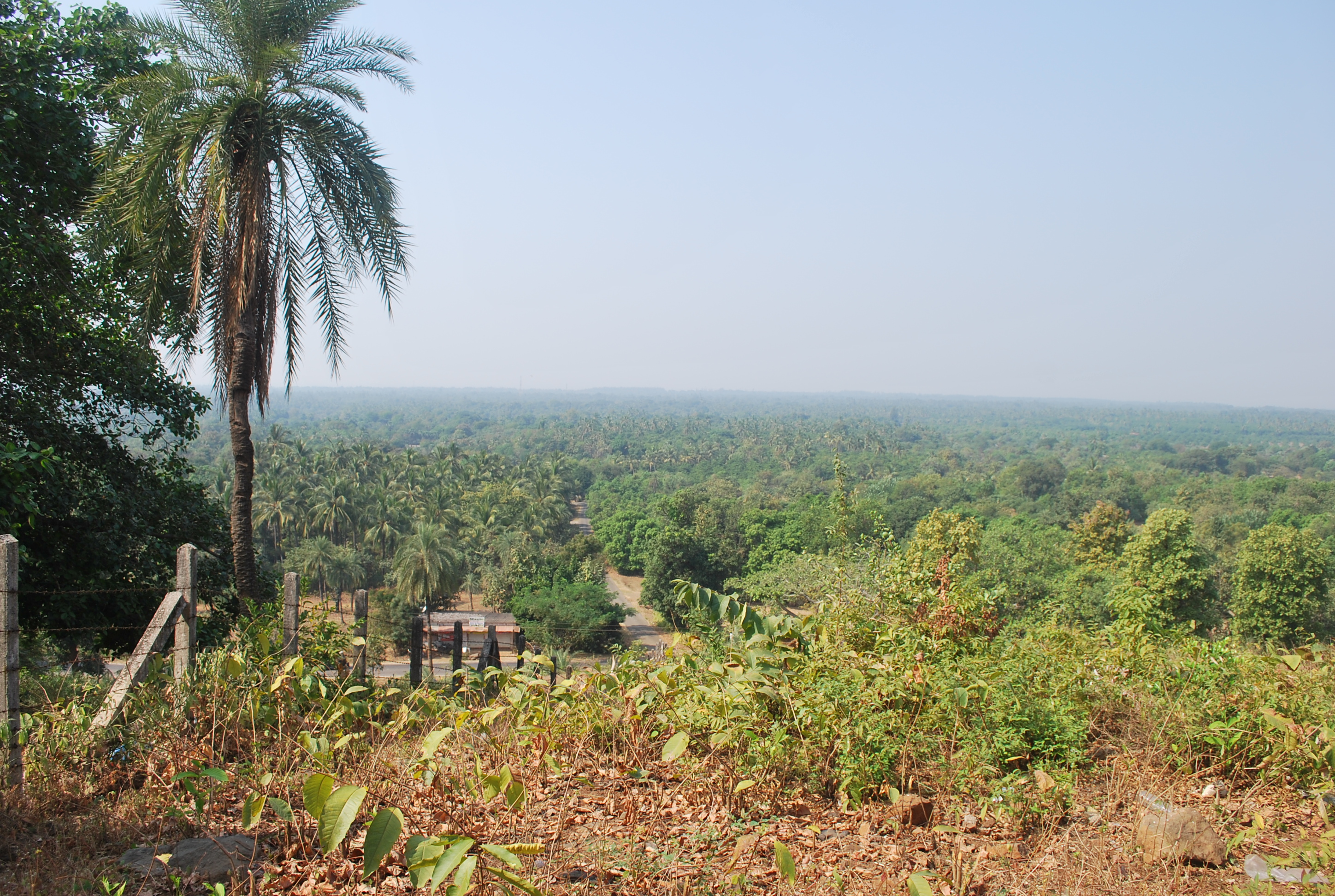
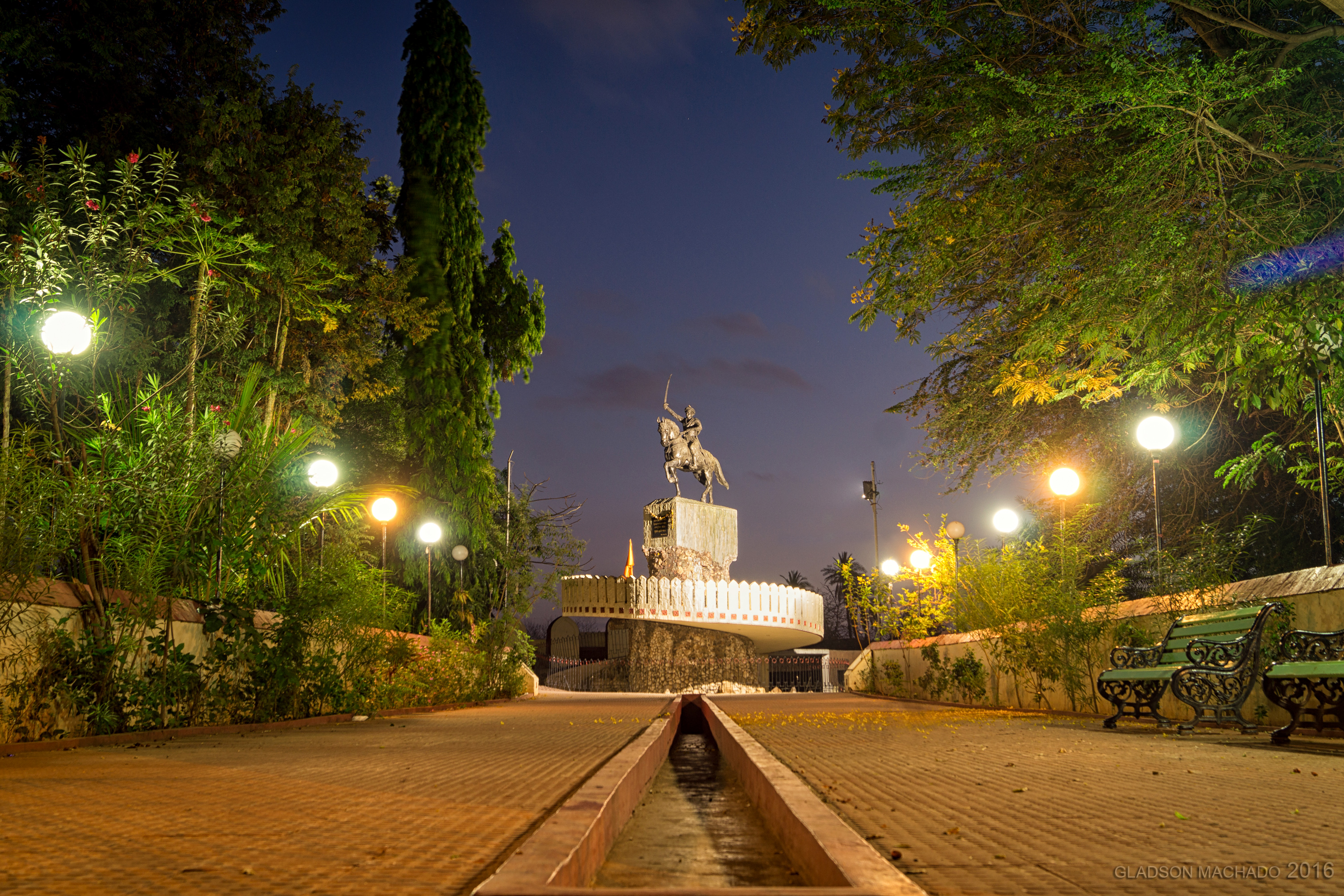
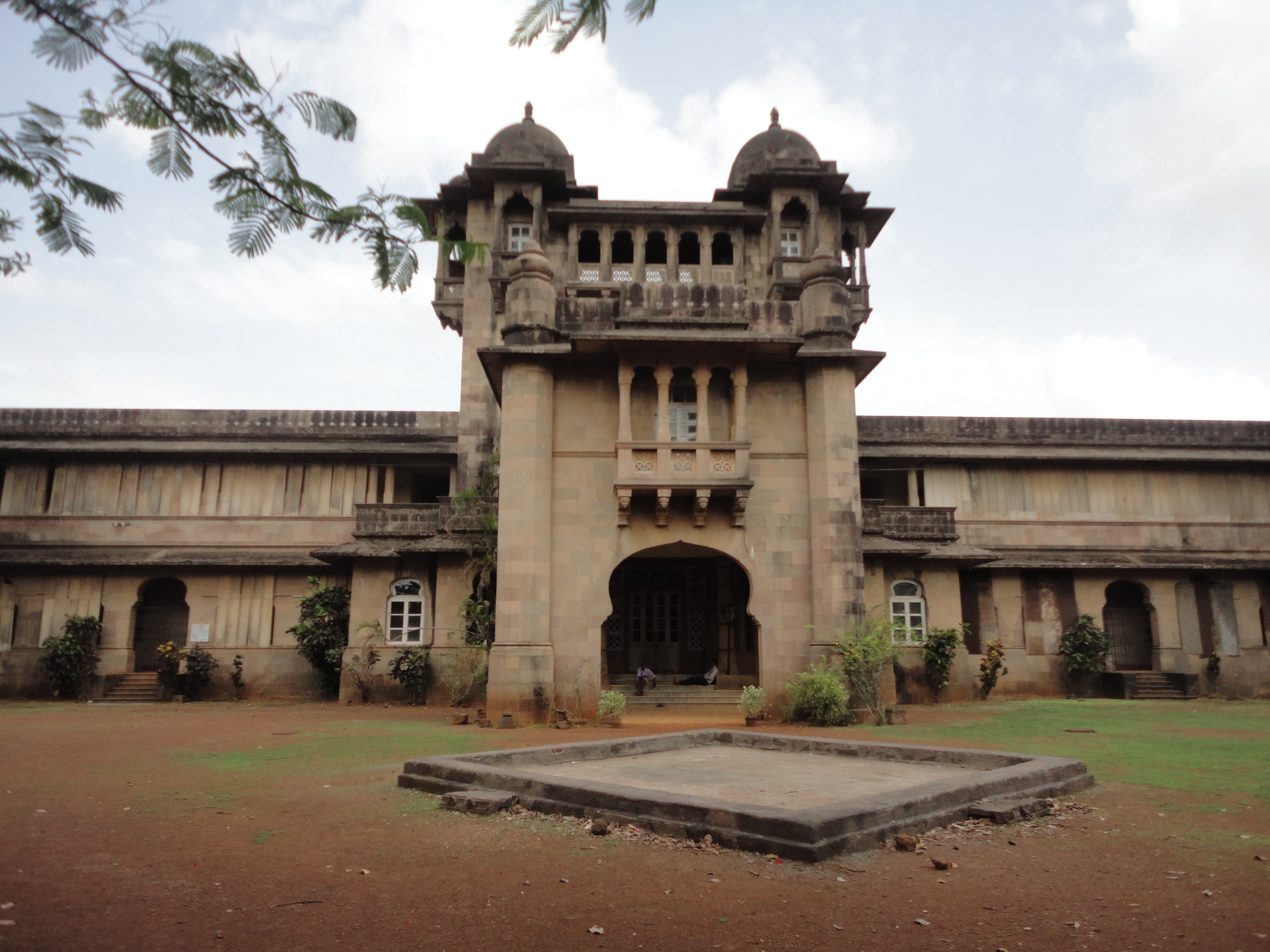
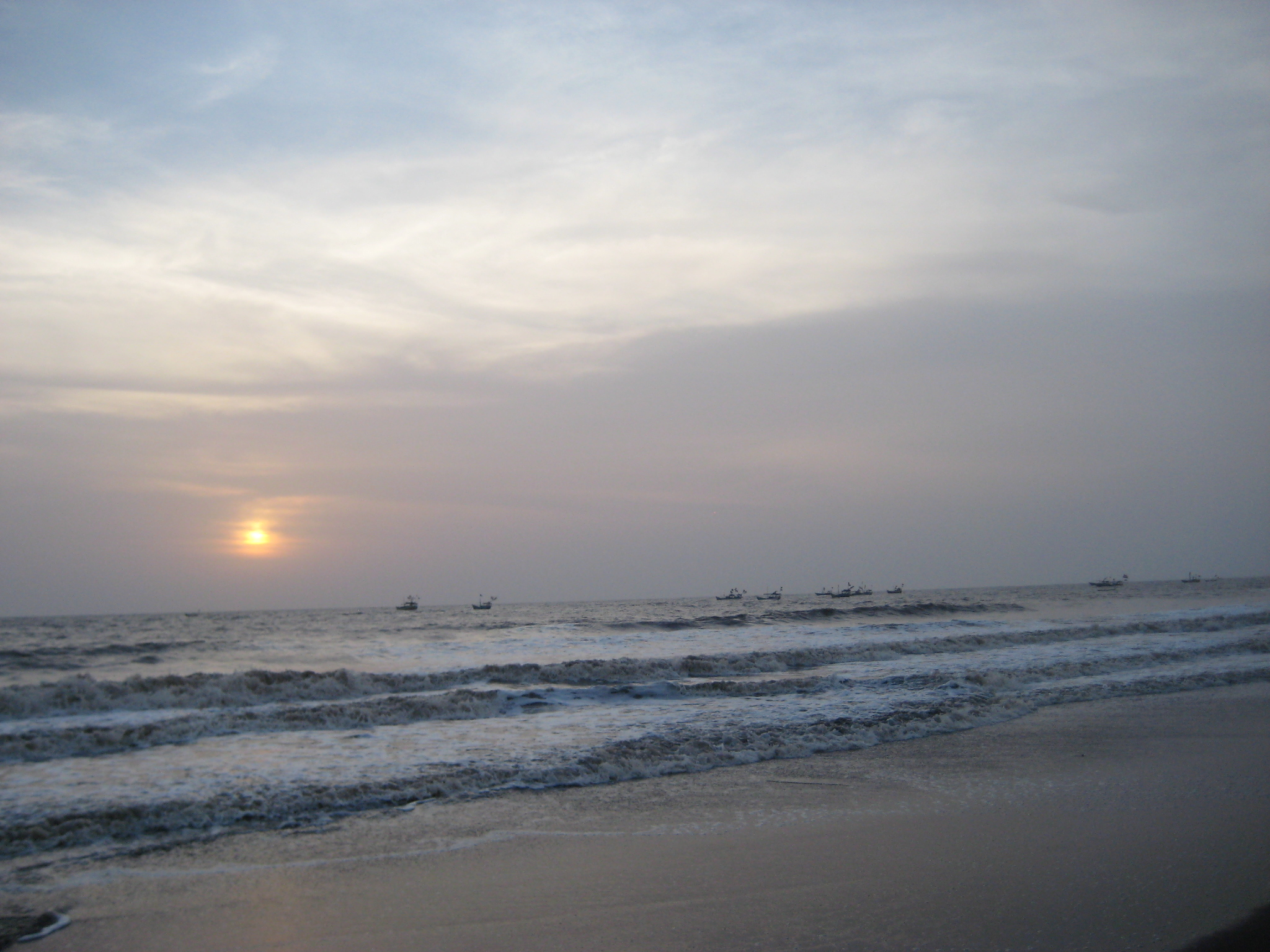
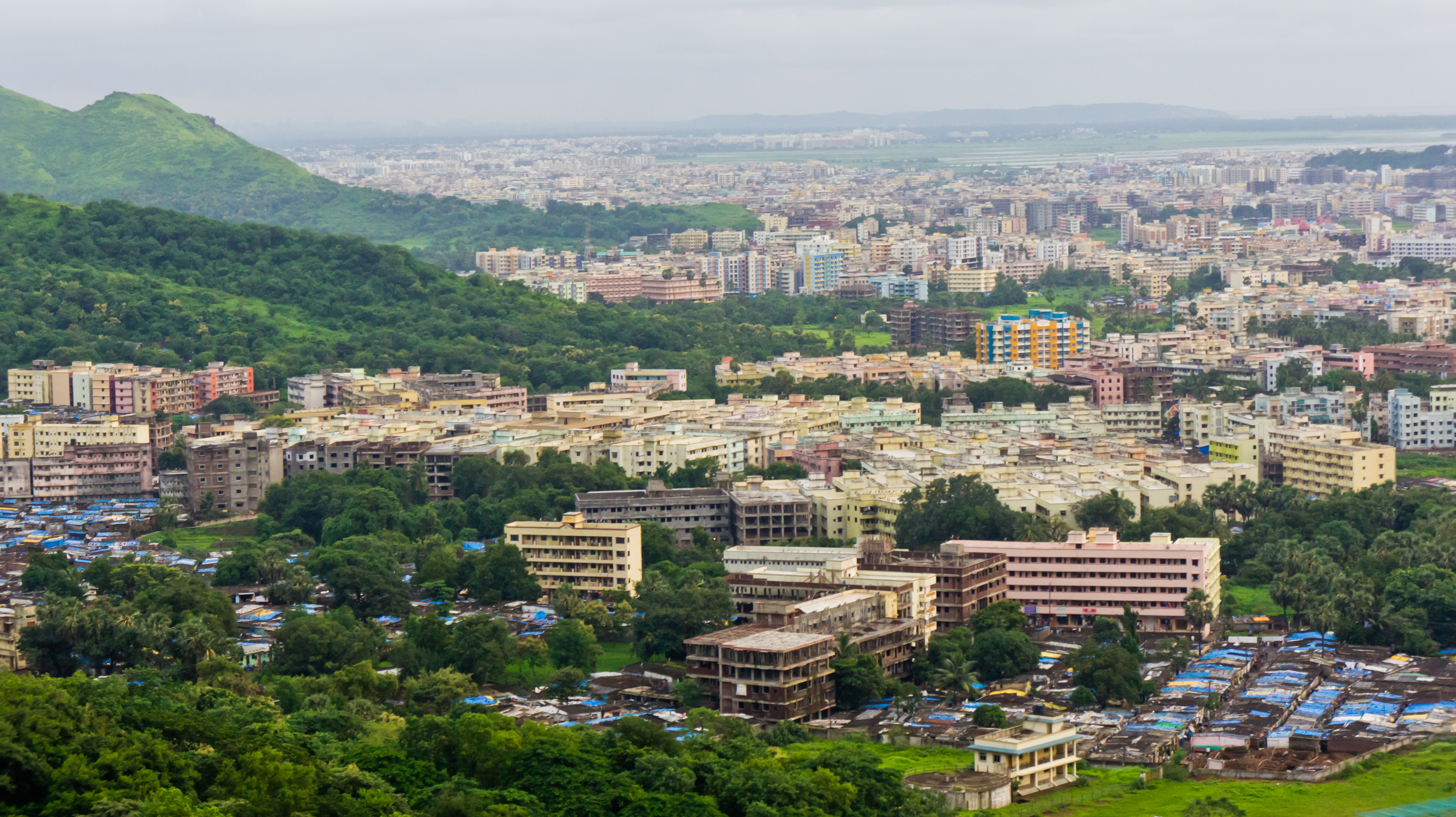
- Clockwise from top-left: View from Kosbad Hill, Chimaji Appa memorial at Vasai Fort, Sunset at beach in Dahanu, View of Virar from Jivdani Hill, Jai Vilas Palace in Jawhar

- Location in Maharashtra, India
- Coordinates: 19.697029°N 72.771249°E
- Country: India
- State: Maharashtra
- Division: Konkan
- Established: 21 August 2016
- Headquarters: Palghar

Government
  - Body: Palghar Zilla Parishad
  - Guardian Minister: Ganesh Naik (Cabinet Minister Mha)
  - President Z. P. Palghar: NA
  - District Collector: Mr. Dr. Manik Gursul (IAS)
  - CEO Z. P. Palghar: NA
  - MPs: Hemant Savara (Palghar)

Area
  - District of Maharashtra: 5,344 km^{2} (2,063 sq mi)

Population (2011 Census)
  - District of Maharashtra: 2,990,116
  - Density: 559.5/km^{2} (1,449/sq mi)
  - Urban: 1,435,210

Languages
  - Official: Marathi
- Time zone: UTC+5:30 (IST)
- Postal codes: 401xxx, 402xxx, 403xxx, 404xxx, 405xxx, 406xxx
- ISO 3166 code: IN-MH
- Vehicle registration: MH-04 (Thane RTO), MH-48 (Palghar District RTO)
- Website: palghar.gov.in

Palghar district (Marathi pronunciation: [paːlɡʱəɾ]) is a district in the Konkan division of the Indian state of Maharashtra. The headquarters of the district is the town of Palghar. Other major cities in the district are Vasai-Virar, Talasari, Jawhar and Dahanu.

On 1 Aug 2014, the Government of Maharashtra announced the formation of Palghar as the 36th district of Maharashtra. It was carved out of Thane district. Palghar District starts from Dahanu in the north and ends at Naigaon. It comprises the talukas of Palghar, Vada, Vikramgad, Jawhar, Mokhada, Dahanu, Talasari and Vasai. At the 2011 Census, the talukas now comprising the district had a population of 2,990,116.

Palghar has an urban population of 1,435,210, that is 48% of total population is living in Urbanized Area. Palghar has all the three categories of the lifestyles, Urban (Nagari), Coastal (Sagari) and Mountains-Hilly Region (Dongari). Palghar District is blessed by beautiful beaches as it is the part of konkan such as "Shirgaon Beach", "Kelve Beach", "Vadrai Beach", "Dahanu Beach", "Bordi Beach", "Chinchani Beach", "Arnala Beach", "Rajodi Beach", "Suruchi Beach", "Kalamb Beach", "Bhuigaon Beach" etc. The district is bounded by Thane and Nashik districts in the east and northeast, and by the Valsad district of Gujarat state and the Dadra and Nagar Haveli district of the Dadra and Nagar Haveli and Daman and Diu union territory in the north. The Arabian Sea forms the western boundary, while the whole district falls under the fastest developing northern part of Mumbai Metropolitan Region. Basically people of Palghar District population belong to Tribal-Konkni, Warli, koli, Agri..

== Officer ==
=== Members of Parliament ===
Hemant Savara (BJP)
(Palghar)

=== Guardian Minister ===
Guardian Minister Palghar
- पालकमंत्री पालघर
- Emblem of India
- Incumbent; Ganesh Naik since 24 September 2022
- Style: The Honourable
- Residence: Palghar
- Appointer: Chief Minister of Maharashtra
- Term length: 5 years / No time limit
- Website: palghar.gov.in/en/

==== list of Guardian Minister ====
Name	Term of office
Vishnu Sawra	31 October 2014 - 8 November 2019
Dadaji Bhuse	9 January 2020 - 27 June 2022
Aditi Sunil Tatkare; Additional charge	27 June 2022 - 29 June 2022
Ravindra Chavan	24 September 2022 - Incumbent

=== District Magistrate/Collector ===
District Magistrate / Collector Palghar
- जिल्हाधिकारी तथा जिल्हदंडाधिकरी पालघर
- Emblem of India
- Incumbent; Indurani Jakhad (IAS) since 2024
- Residence: At Palghar District
- Appointer: Government of Maharashtra
- Term length: No time limit
- Website: palghar.gov.in/en/

==== List of District Magistrate / Collector ====
Name	Term of office
Dr. Manik Gursul (IAS)	2018 - 2022
Mr. Govind Bodke (IAS)	2022 - 2024
Mrs. Indu Rani Jhakar (IAS)	2024 - Current

== History ==
Until 1 August 2014, the talukas now comprising Palghar District formed a part of Thane District. After a struggle and demand for almost 25 years, for bifurcation, the creation of the new district was approved by the Cabinet of Maharashtra on 13 June 2014 and the new district of Palghar came into existence on 1 August.

== Geography ==
The district is the northernmost part of the Konkan lowlands of Maharashtra. It comprises the wide, amphitheater-like Ulhas basin on the south and the hilly Vaitarna valley on the north, together with plateaus and the slopes of Sahyadri. From the steep slopes of the Sahyadri in the east, the land falls through a succession of plateaus in the north and centre of the district to the Ulhas valley in the south. The distance from the parts of different palaces to headquarters Palghar, by road is as follows: Khodala 138 km, Mokhada 112 km, Jawhar 75 km, Vikramgad 60 km.

Palghar can be separated into three geographical regions. The Eastern part of the Western Ghats, or Sahyadri mountains, is called jangalapatti. This mainly encompasses the Jawhar, Mokhada, and Vikramgad talukas. The western part of the mountains district is called bandarpatti which includes Vasai, Palghar, Dahanu. The third section is characterized by broad and flat land, including the Wada taluka.

The main river flowing through the district is the Vaitarna. The river has many tributaries; the most important of them are Barvi and Bhatsa, Pinjal, Surya, Daherja and Tansa. Vaitarna, the largest of Konkan Rivers rises in the Trimbakeshwar hills in Nashik district, opposite to the source of Godavari. The river flows across Shahapur, Vada and Palghar talukas and enter the Arabian Sea through a wide estuary off Arnala. Vaitarna River is 154 km long and has a drainage area that practically covers the entire northern part of the district. In Palghar many students come for studying from outer areas. Ulhas river which flows to Arabian sea is Vasai creek, district's southern border. Arnala Island is located in Vasai taluka, at the entrance to the Vaitarna estuary.

The Palghar district gets some of the most rainfall in all of Maharashtra, an average 3000 mm (118 in) every year. Given its proximity to Mumbai, Palghar serves as a water catchment area to Mumbai. There are many dams, such as the Tansa Dam, which collect water and deliver to Mumbai through pipelines. There are various debates on if this is damaging to Palghar. Some scholars argue believe this is necessary to meet the water demands of a large-scale city, but others argue that this is depriving Palghar residents of water, many of whom are farmers and have high water needs for agriculture.

=== Climate ===
Palghar

Climate chart (precipitation, max. and min. temperature)
J	F	M	A	M	J	J	A	S	O	N	D
0.6 31 12	1.5 31 15	0.1 33 21	0.6 33 24	13 33 26	574 32 26	868 30 25	553 29 25	306 30 24	63 33 23	15 33 19	5.6 32 10
- █ Average max. and min. temperatures in °C
- █ Precipitation totals in mm
- Source: Indian Meteorological Department
Imperial conversion
J	F	M	A	M	J	J	A	S	O	N	D
0 87 54	0.1 88 59	0 91 69	0 92 75	0.5 92 78	23 89 78	34 86 77	22 85 76	12 86 75	2.5 91 74	0.6 92 65	0.2 90 50
- █ Average max. and min. temperatures in °F
- █ Precipitation totals in inches

== Divisions ==
Palghar has an urban population of 1,435,210, that is 48% of total population is living in Urbanized Area. Palghar District comprises 8 talukas. The talukas, with their populations at the 2001 and 2011 Censuses are as follows:

=== List of Talukas ===
Taluka	Population Census 2001	Population Census 2011
Vasai	795,863	1,343,402
Palghar	454,635	550,166
Dahanu	331,829	402,095
Talasari	121,217	154,818
Jawhar	111,039	140,187
Mokhada	67,319	83,453
Vada	142,753	178,370
Vikramgad	114,254	137,625

== Sub-Divisions and Talukas ==
♦ Vasai⇒Vasai

♦Palghar⇒ Palghar

♦Dahanu⇒ Dahanu, Talasari

♦Vada⇒ Vada, Vikramgad

♦Jawhar⇒ Jawhar, Mokhada

=== Municipal Corporations in Palghar District ===
- Vasai-Virar

=== Municipal Councils in Palghar District ===
- Palghar
- Dahanu
- Jawhar

=== Nagar Panchyats in Palghar District ===
- Talasari
- Vikramgad
- Vada
- Mokhada

=== Proposed Municipal Councils in Palghar District ===
- Boisar {Proposed Boisar Municipal Council includes towns of Boisar, Dandi, Khaira, Holipada, Katkar, Salgaon, Pasthal, Salwad, Pam, Kumbhavali, Kolawade, Saravali, Bategaon, Man}
- Vada {merging villages of Kirwali, Gandhre, Ainshet, Pethranjani, Varle, Kadivali, Gale, Desai, Harosale}

=== Proposed Nagar Panchyats in Palghar District ===
- Tarapur {merging villages of Tarapur, Kambode, Sawarai, Kudan, Vengani, Ghivali, Akkarpatti, Popharan, Patharli, Unbhat}
- Chinchani {merging of Chinchani, Vavrol, Bariwada, Patilwada, Dandepada, etc}
- Saphale {merging Saphale and Umbarpada Nandade}
- Kelve Road {merging Kelve Road, Ravlepada, Dhondalpada, Zanzroli and Bandate}
- Vadhavan (centered on Vadhavan port. merging villages of Vadhavan, Ambistewadi, Varor, Gungwada, etc)
- Charoti {merging Charoti, Bharad, and Kasa Khurd}
- Manor
- Vangaon
- Gholvad
- Sarsun

=== Constituencies ===
There are six Vidhan Sabha constituencies in Palghar district, grouped into one Lok Sabha constituency; Dahanu (ST), Vikramgad (ST), Palghar (ST), Boisar (ST), Nalasopara and Vasai constituencies are part of Palghar Lok Sabha constituency. Hemant Vishnu Savara from Bharatiya Janta Party is member for Palghar of the 18th Lok Sabha.

== Demographics ==
At the time of the 2011 census, Palghar district had a population of 2,990,116, of which 1,561,438 (52.22%) lived in urban areas. Palghar had a sex ratio of 934 females per 1000 males. Scheduled Castes and Scheduled Tribes made up 2.91% and 37.39% of the population respectively.

=== Religion ===
Religions in Palghar district (2011)
Religion	Percent
Hinduism	87.05%
Islam	5.76%
Christianity	3.89%
Buddhism	1.59%
Jainism	1.03%
Other or not stated	0.68%

=== Languages ===
Languages in Palghar diatrict (2011)
1. Marathi (61.6%)
2. Hindi (15.3%)
3. Varli (6.12%)
4. Gujarati (5.61%)
5. Urdu (1.76%)
6. Bhojpuri (1.75%)
7. Marwadi (1.01%)
8. Others (6.77%)

According to the 2011 census, 61.96% of the population spoke Marathi, 15.33% Hindi, 6.12% Varli, 5.61% Gujarati, 1.76% Urdu, 1.75% Bhojpuri and 1.01% Marwari as their first language.

== Transportation ==
The Western Railway network passes through Vasai, Palghar and Dahanu talukas of the district. The Western Express Highway (NH48) has passed through manor and chilhar for enter in Palghar district.

== Economy ==
In the mountainous regions of the Palghar district, such as in Jawhar and Mokhada, agriculture is the primary business. These areas mainly cultivate rice, millet, and black gram, as well as a variety of fruits and vegetables. Due to Palghar district's proximity to Mumbai, the region is primary source of produce and grains to the Mumbai Metropolitan Area. The dependency on the district has led the Government of Maharashtra to encourage organic farming in Palghar in order to ensure agricultural output and work towards sustainable options. The western 'bandarpatti' region's economy relies on in agricultural and fishing businesses. Dahanu is known for their chickoo production, which is distributed throughout all of India. A special Chickoo festival is held every year at Bordi beach in Dahanu. Satpati, also in 'bandarpatti, is Maharashtra's largest fishing port. Dahanu, Arnala, Vasai and Datiware are also major fishing ports in the region.

Palghar has India's first atomic power plant located at Tarapur. The industrial town of Boisar is also home to one of Maharashtra's largest industrial areas at Tarapur MIDC. MSEDCL supplies electricity to all urban and rural areas across the district. Gujarat Gas has been authorized in April 2015 to supply compressed natural gas and piped natural gas to all urban and rural areas across the district.

== Tourist Places ==
The Vasai Taluka of Palghar district is a melting pot of Multi Cultural & Multi religious populace. The Portuguese footprints has left its cultural mix in this area. This taluka has about 9 big Churches built during 1564 AD. which are a great tourist attraction. The Buddha Stupa near NallaSopara West is also a great historic place. The Nirmal Lake is a sacred place in Vasai, which dates back to Shri Parshuram time. There are hill stations and beaches in the district which are the major tourist attractions. Some of the major tourist attractions are

1. Arnala Fort
2. Bhavangad Fort
3. Bordi Beach
4. Dabhosa Water fall (Jawhar)
5. Dahanu Beach
6. Deobandh Kendra
7. Ganeshpuri Temple
8. Jawhar Hill station
9. Jivdani Mata temple (Virar)
10. Kelwa Beach
11. kelwa dam
12. Kohoj Fort
13. Mahalakshmi Temple at Kasa (Dahanu)
14. Mahim Beach
15. Mahim Fort
16. Suryamal Hill Plateau
17. Tandulwadi Fort
18. Tansa Wildlife Sanctuary
19. Vasai Fort
20. Vajreshwari Hot water springs

== See also ==
- 2020 Palghar mob lynching
