= Tarapur =

Tarapur may refer to places in India:

- Tarapur, Bihar
  - Tarapur Assembly constituency
- Tarapur, Gujarat
- Tarapur, Madhya Pradesh
- Tarapur, Maharashtra
  - Tarapur Atomic Power Station
- Tarapur, Odisha
- Tarapur, Murshidabad
- Tarapur, Raebareli, a village in Uttar Pradesh

== See also ==
- Tarapore, an Indian surname
- Tarapuram, a village in Andhra Pradesh, India
