= Umroli railway station =

Railway Station in Maharashtra, India

Umroli

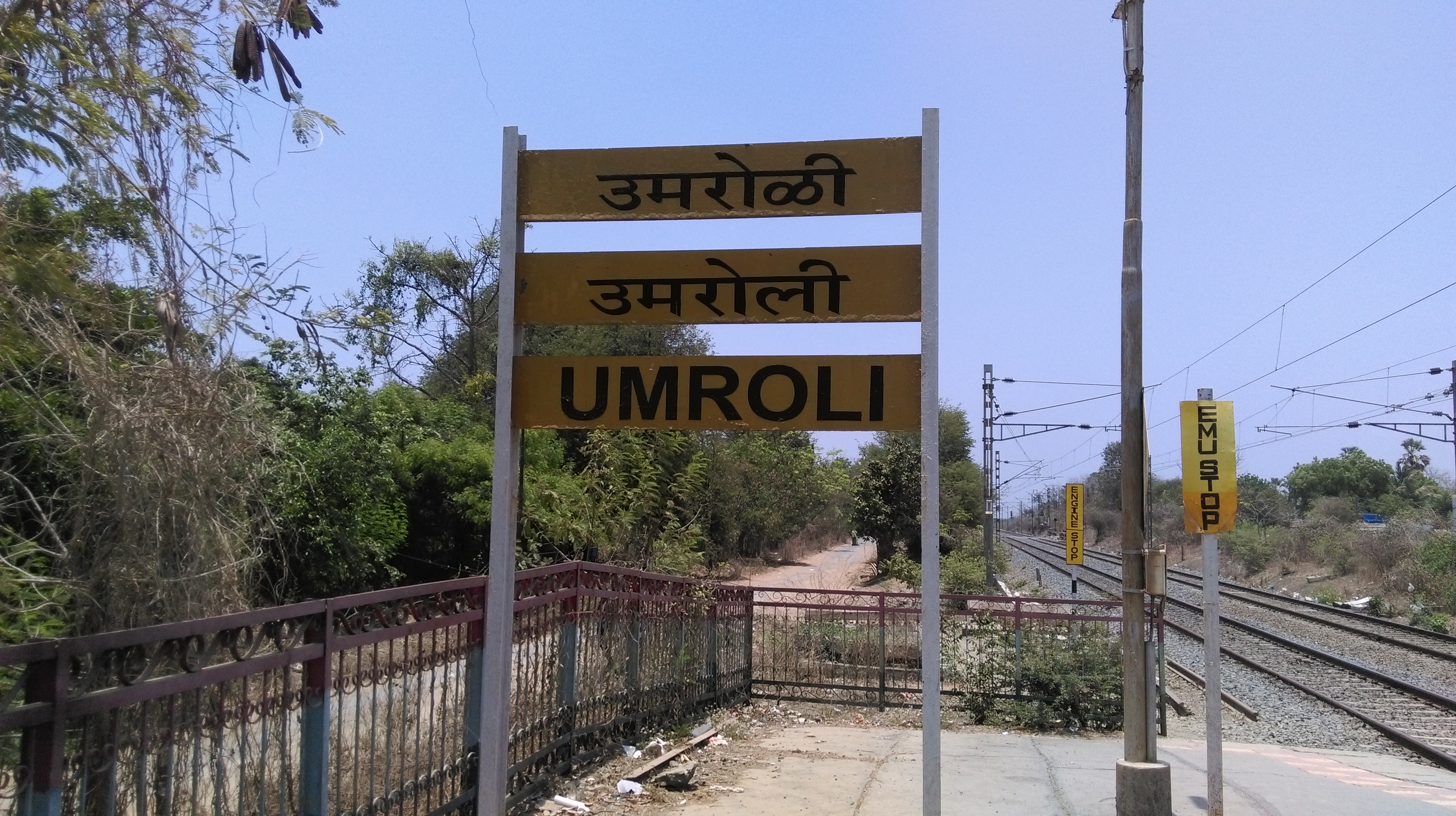

General information
- Location: Umroli
- Coordinates: 19.755150°N 72.760566°E
- System: Mumbai Suburban Railway station
- Owner: Ministry of Railways, Indian Railways
- Line: Western Line

Construction
- Structure type: Standard on-ground station

Other information
- Status: Active
- Station code: UOI
- Fare zone: Western Railways

Services
Preceding station	Mumbai Suburban Railway	Following station
Palghar towards Churchgate	Western line	Boisar towards Dahanu Road
Route map
Location
- Location within India Location within Maharashtra

Umroli railway station is on the Western line of the Mumbai Suburban Railway network. It a station that falls between Palghar and Boisar. All Dahanu-bound local trains halt at Umroli station. This region is developing rapidly as it falls in the vicinity of Boisar and Palghar.

== Gallery ==
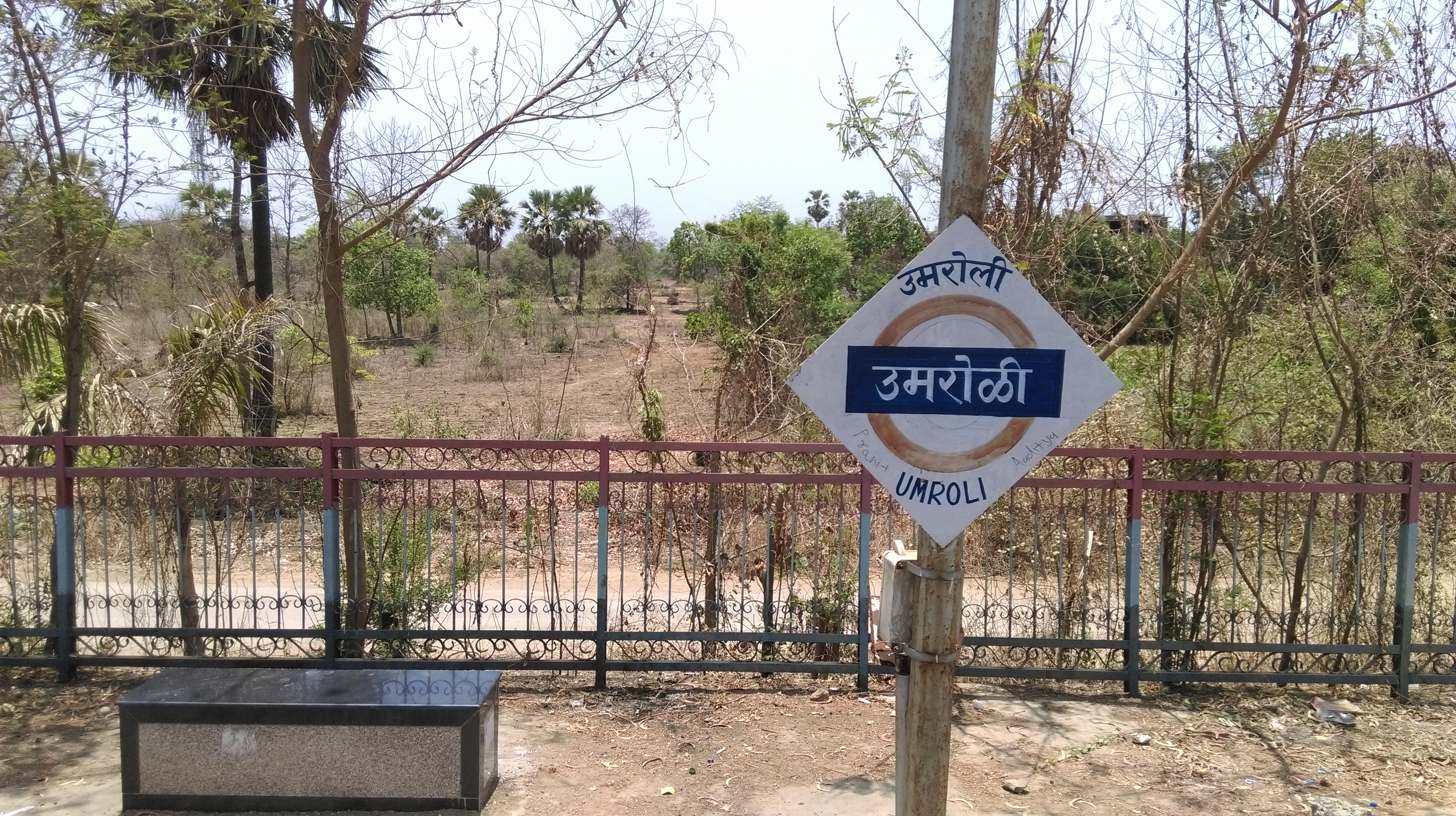
Umroli railway station - Platform board
