= Umroli =

- small town in Boisar Palghar
- Location in Maharashtra, India
- Coordinates: 19.7558°N 72.7606°E
- Country: India
- State: Maharashtra
- District: Palghar

Government
  - Type: Gram panchayat

Languages
  - Official: Marathi
- Time zone: UTC+5:30 (IST)
- Postal code: 401404
- Vehicle registration: MH-48, MH-04

Umroli is a town in Maharashtra. It also has a railway station on the western Line of the Mumbai Suburban Railway. It is located roughly 6 km (3.7 mi) north of Palghar which is the district headquarters. Umroli was situated in the old Thane District of Maharashtra. After the bifurcation, it is now a part of the Palghar district.

== Location ==
Umroli is located 8 km (5.0 mi) south of Boisar on the Western Railway and 6 km (3.7 mi) from Palghar line of Mumbai Suburban Railway. It can be reached from National Highway NH-4, 30 km (19 mi) off from Charoti Naka. It is 40 km (25 mi) north of Virar on the Western Railway line.

== Industrial area and power stations ==
Tarapur Industrial Estate, Tarapur Atomic Power Station, and a thermal power station owned by Reliance Energy Limited are located close by. The huge industrial area at Tarapur accommodates various specialty chemicals, bulk drugs, steel and alloy, and textile manufacturing companies.
