= Boisar =

City in Maharashtra, India

- City
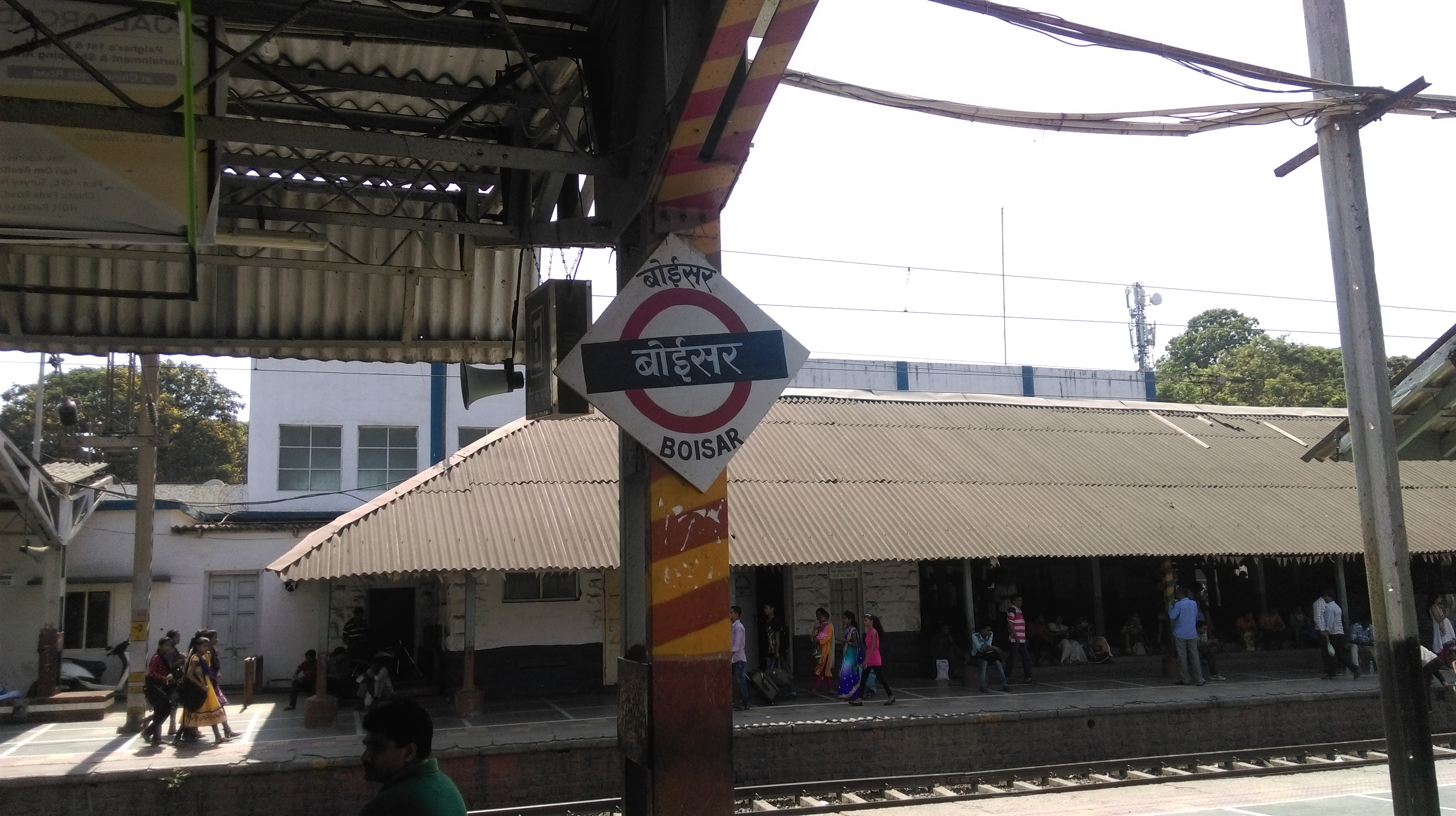
- Boisar railway station

- Location of Boisar in Maharashtra Boisar (India) Boisar (Asia)
- Coordinates: 19.8036°N 72.756°E
- Country: India
- State: Maharashtra
- Division: Konkan
- District: Palghar (Earlier Thane)
- Tehsil: Palghar

Government
  - Type: State Govt, Municipal Council
  - Body: Palghar Municipal Council (PMC)
  - Lok Sabha Constituency: Palghar
  - MP(खासदार): Rajendra Gavit (Shiv Sena)
  - Vidhan Sabha: Boisar
  - MLA(आमदार): Rajesh Raghunath Patil (Bahujan Vikas Aaghadi)
  - Tehsildar: Maheyssh Sagar

Area
  - Total: 8.90 km^{2} (3.44 sq mi)
- Elevation: 10 m (33 ft)

Population (2023)
  - Total: 400,000 + register voter
  - Density: 45,000/km^{2} (120,000/sq mi)
- Demonym(s): Boisarkar, Boisarean, Boisary
- Time zone: UTC+5:30 (IST)
- PINs: 401 501 to 401 506
- Area code: +91-02525
- ISO 3166 code: IN-MH
- Vehicle registration: MH-48
- Official language: Marathi
- Other languages: English Hindi
- UN/LOCODE: IN BOM BOR

Boisar is one of the largest industrial towns in Palghar district of Indian state Maharashtra. It is approximately 111 kilometers (69 miles) away from the state capital Mumbai, and 98 km (61 mi) from the union territory Daman.

Boisar hosts India's first nuclear power station—Tarapur Atomic Power Station (TAPS). It has a railway station in the Western Railway zone of Indian Railways as well as Mumbai Suburban Railway. The Mumbai–Ahmedabad high-speed rail corridor has a proposed Station at Boisar.

Boisar is a popular weekend spot for tourists and locals due to nearby beaches, forts and lakes. The place has seen rapid development due to:

- The existence of more than 1500 industrial units.
- Its proximity to Mumbai & Gujarat.
- Easy access by train and road.
- Availability of surplus power and water.
- Its vicinity of Maharashtra's largest fishing port Satpati (20 km [12 mi]).
- The upcoming Mumbai-Ahmedabad bullet train having a station at Boisar.
- The upcoming Mumbai-Vadodara expressway.
- The expansion of sea transport project.

== History ==
Boisar city was part of the Rashtrakuta dynasty which had ruled the Deccan plateau between the 8th and 10th centuries. It was ruled by Ahmadnagar (1521–1594), the Portuguese Empire (1594), the Maratha Empire (1739–1818), the East India Company (1818–1857) and the British Raj (1857–1947). There are some forts near the city, such as Asava Fort (11 km), Tarapur Fort (11 km [6.8 mi]), Kaldurg Fort(174 km [108 mi]), Shirgaon Fort (18 km [11 mi]), Mahim Fort (20 km [12 mi]), and Asheri Fort (25 km [16 mi]).

Boisar was initially inhabited by the Kolis and Konkanis who were fish and used to live in the Arabian Sea coast. The Kolis are traditional fishermen who speak different dialects of Marathi.

The present Vanjari community of Boisar was part of the Indus Valley civilization and originate from Chittorgarh, Rajasthan. They migrated to "Moradi" port (today "Murbe") to trade in Boisar because the British started the railway in 1853 which halted the grain trade. Their language is distinct from standard Marathi as it influenced by Rajasthani and Gujarati.

The Vadval community is located in Boisar, Tarapur. They are said to be the descendants of Yadava dynasty of Devagiri. They form one of the few Marathi-speaking communities which belong to Kshatriya varna but not the traditional 96-clan Maratha caste.

Boisar was town in Bombay state between 18th to 19th century. It was also city in the Thane district after the independence of India. Palghar district is the current district of Boisar from 1 August 2014.

== Geography ==
Boisar encompasses an area of 8.90 square kilometres (3.44 sq mi). It is located at 19° 48' 13N 72° 45' 22E and has an average altitude of 45 ft (14 m) at the base of the eastern slopes of the Sahyadri. Boisar is a part of the coastal country known as the Konkan with the Arabian Sea forming its western coast, and is about 7.21 kilometres (4.48 mi) from the shores. It is close to Maharashtra, Gujarat, and Daman. People in and around Boisar use Marathi as a common language.

=== Hydrography ===
The two main rivers flowing through the city are the Surya and the Banganga (which has Betegaon Railway Bridge). Many small creeks are found all along the western coast villages like Kolwade, Kumbhavali, and Murbe where tidal waters flood upstream. There are dams such as the Surya Dam and the Devkhop dam.

Boisar has no natural lakes but it has artificial ones. The Babule Lake and Navale Lake near the city are known for lotus blooms in winter. The Kokner/Kokaner hot water spring is on the banks on the Surya river; the water is a murky greenish brown due to sulphur & chemical deposits from the spring.

=== Pedology ===
Basalt and medium deep grayish black soil are found in the hill area and deep black soils are found in the basins of Surya river. Coastal saline soil occurs along the Arabian Sea. Other than basalt, minor minerals like murrum are found in the city.

=== Climate ===
According to the Köppen climate classification, the climate of Boisar is tropical, very humid, and warm because of the western coastal plains. The city experiences three main seasons and one transitional season. They are:

1. Winter Season (December to February).
2. Summer Season (March to June).
3. Monsoon Season (June to September).
4. Post Monsoon Season / Autumn (October and November): Hot and humid in the coastal areas.

Climate data for Boisar
Month	Jan	Feb	Mar	Apr	May	Jun	Jul	Aug	Sep	Oct	Nov	Dec	Year
Mean daily maximum °C (°F)	28.1 (82.6)	28.6 (83.5)	30.7 (87.3)	32.3 (90.1)	33.1 (91.6)	31.9 (89.4)	29.7 (85.5)	29.2 (84.6)	29.7 (85.5)	32 (90)	31.9 (89.4)	29.9 (85.8)	31.7 (89.1)
Mean daily minimum °C (°F)	17.1 (62.8)	17.8 (64.0)	21.1 (70.0)	23.9 (75.0)	26.6 (79.9)	26.3 (79.3)	25.0 (77.0)	24.7 (76.5)	24.2 (75.6)	23.2 (73.8)	20.2 (68.4)	18.1 (64.6)	22.1 (71.8)
Average precipitation mm (inches)	1 (0.0)	0 (0)	1 (0.0)	1 (0.0)	10 (0.4)	437 (17.2)	856 (33.7)	466 (18.3)	289 (11.4)	68 (2.7)	9 (0.4)	1 (0.0)	2,477.5 (97.54)
Source: Boisar Weather By Month

== Demographics ==
Census India 2011 reported a total of 20319 males and 15832 females and a total number of 4896 children below 6 years of age in Boisar. The child sex ratio is around 919 compared to the Maharashtra state average of 894. The literacy rate of Boisar is 88.49%, higher than the state average of 82.34%. The city has complete administration over 8,711 houses to which it supplies basic amenities like water and sewerage. It is also authorized to build roads within town limits and impose taxes on properties under its jurisdiction. Out of its total population, 14,372 are employed; 12,312 were males while 2,060 were females. In the census survey, a worker is defined as person who performs a job, service, cultivation, or labour. Of the 14372 people that were surveyed to be working, 89.32% were engaged in main work while 10.68% of total workers were engaged in marginal work.

Population and Literacy of Boisar(2011)
Total Population	36151 (100%)
Males	20319(56.21%)
Females	15832 (43.79)%
Children	4896(13.54%)
Literacy Rate	88.49%
Male Literacy	93.08%
Female Literacy	82.44%

=== Religion ===
According to the 2011 census, out of a total of 36,151 people in Boisar, Hindus (83.84%) constituted the majority of the city population. Schedule Caste (SC) constituted 4.82% while Schedule Tribe (ST) were 1.76% of the total population. The official language of Boisar is Marathi but Hindi and English are also allowed to be used for any official purpose. Marathi is the most widely spoken language with Vanjari, Agri, Koli, Vadvali and Warli dialects. Small communities of Gujaratis and Muslims speak Gujarati and Urdu respectively. Marathi, Hindi, and English are compulsory languages in schools whereas Sanskrit and Urdu are optional.

Religion in Boisar(2011)
1. Hinduism (83.8%)
2. Islam (11.8%)
3. Buddhism (1.38%)
4. Jainism (1.37%)
5. Christianity (0.85%)
6. Sikhism (0.03%)
7. Not Stated (0.45%)
8. Others (0.02%)

== Culture ==
=== Festivals ===
Boisar residents celebrate Marathi, Indian, and Western festivals. Ganesh Chaturthi and Gokulashtami/Dahi Handi are popular festivals in the city. Some other festivals celebrated in the city are :

Name	Hindu Calendar Month	Gregorian calendar Months
Marathi New Year (Gudi Padwa), Rama Navami, Hanuman Jayanti	Chaitra(चैत्र)	March–April
Akshaya Tritiya, Buddha's Birthday(Budha Purnima)	Vaisakha(वैशाख)	April–May
Vat Purnima	Jyeshtha(ज्येष्ठ)	May–June
Guru Purnima	Ashadha(आषाढ़)	June–July
Naga Panchami, Narali Purnima(Coconut day), Gokulashtami/Dahi Handi, Pola	Shraavana(श्रावण)	July–August
Ganesh Chaturthi, Anant Chaturdashi	Bhadrapada(भाद्रपद)	August–September
Dussehra, Kojagiri Purnima, Lakshmi Pujan	Ashwina(अश्विन)	September–October
Balipratipada, Diwali, Bhaubeej	Kartika(कार्तिक)	October–November
Datta Jayanti, Sri Mahalakshmi Vrat, Christmas	Mārgasirsa(मार्गशीष)	November–December
New Year's Day Makar Sankranti	Pausha(पौष)	December–January
Rama Navami, Maha Shivaratri, Shiv Jayanti	Māgha(माघ)	November–December
Shiv Jayanti, Holi	Phalguna(फाल्गुन)	February–March

== Transportation ==
=== Railway Station ===
- Boisar railway station is the main mode of transportation.
- All local trains runs between Dahanu and Churchgate; Dahanu-Virar has a stop at Boisar railway station.
- It is part of the Western Railway zone of Indian Railways.
- There are some local trains and express trains that run through Boisar station to the Mumbai Central line and Central Railway zone of Indian Railways via the Boisar-Vasai-Bhiwandi-Panvel railway route.
- Boisar railway station has 3 platforms and multiple tracks. After a period of neglect, it has become properly maintained.

=== Road ===
- Transportation inside city is done by three-wheeled buses auto rickshaws.
- (Boisar-Palghar), (Boisar-Navapur, Nandgaon, Alewadi and Kumbhavali) and (Boisar-Tarapur) are connected via 10-seat passenger auto rickshaws and Maharashtra State Road Transport Corporation buses.
- Maharashtra State Road Transport Corporation provides AC and non AC bus services to other cities in Maharashtra.
- Boisar is 18 kms away from Chilhar phata at national highway NH 48, (formerly known as Mumbai-Ahmedabad highway NH8), which connects to Maharashtra and Gujarat.

=== Boat Services ===
- In city, the coastal area usually commutes by ferry. Routes are defined by Maharashtra Maritime Board.
1. Navapur to Dandi.
2. Murbe to Satpati.
3. Murbe to Kharekuran.
- Ferries are available throughout the year from 6 am to 6 pm, except during monsoons. Timings of ferry can change depending on the tide.

=== Air ===
- Boisar has no airport.
- The nearest airport is Chhatrapati Shivaji Maharaj International Airport Mumbai (BOM) which is 105 km (65 mi) away.

== Education ==
=== Schools and Higher Secondary Schools (Junior Colleges) ===
There are schools and junior colleges in Boisar. Most of them are run by private institutes and trusts. The city's public school system and junior colleges are managed by the education ministry of the Government of Maharashtra. The schools and junior colleges are affiliated with the following boards:

1. Maharashtra State Board of Secondary and Higher Secondary Education.
  1. Secondary School Certificate (SSC): 10th grade.
  2. Higher School Certificate (HSC): 12th grade.
2. Central Board of Secondary Education (CBSE).
3. Indian Certificate of Secondary Education (ICSE).

=== Institutes headquartered in city proximity ===
Established	Institute	Type	Commissioning Body/Affiliation	Level	Specialisation
1975	P.l. Shroff College Chinchani	Public	Affiliated to Mumbai University	Graduate and Post-graduate	Arts, Science, IT and Management.
1984	Sonpat Dandekar	Public	Affiliated to Mumbai University	Graduate and Post-graduate	Arts, Science, IT and Finance Management.
2009	Theem College of Engineering	Private	Affiliated to Mumbai University	Undergraduate (Diploma) and Graduate	Engineering
2006	SAS Institute of Management Studies	Private	Affiliated to Mumbai University	Post-graduate	Management
2002	Dr M.L.Dhawale Memorial Homoeopathic Institute	Private	Affiliated to Maharashtra University of Health Sciences (MUHS)	(MD)Post-graduate	Medical
2002	AGS College of Education	Private	Affiliated to Mumbai University	(BEd) Graduate	Education
2009	Diwakar Patil College of Education	Private	Affiliated to Mumbai University	(BEd)Graduate	Education
	Holy Cross Night Degree College	Private	Affiliated to Mumbai University	Graduate	Bachelor of Arts, Commerce and Science
2018	Diwakar Patil Private Industrial Training Institute(ITI)	Private	Affiliated to National Council for Vocational Training(NCVT)	Post School Courses	Industrial Training

=== Professional Programme (Internship and Apprenticeship) ===
- Boisar is known for its industrial hub and most industries (especially chemical, pharmaceutical, textile and mechanical companies) offer internship and apprenticeship programs to college undergraduates and postgraduates. Banks and hospitals also provide work experience for students and professionals.

=== Research Institutions ===
Boisar is home to two prominent research institutions: the Bhabha Atomic Research Centre (BARC) and the Agricultural Research Station.

== Notable people ==
- Shardul Thakur, Indian cricketer lives here
- Rajani Pandit better known as female Sherlock Holmes or India's Sherlock, who is India's first female detective

== See also ==
- Boisar-Vidhan Sabha constituency
- Boisar Railway Station
- Tarapur Atomic Power Station
- Township in Boisar-Sai Baba Boulevard
