= Tarapur, Maharashtra =

Tarapur
- Town
- Nickname: Vadawariya
- Location of Tarapur in Maharashtra
- Coordinates: 19.864°N 72.684°E
- Country: India
- State: Maharashtra
- District: Palghar
- Elevation: 10 m (33 ft)

Population (2001)
  - Total: 37,541
- Demonym: Tarapurkar

Languages
  - Official: Marathi
- Time zone: UTC+5:30 (IST)
- PIN: 401504, 401506
- Telephone code: +91 2525
- Vehicle registration: MH-48

Tarapur is a census town in Palghar district (earlier Palghar was taluka and has recently notified as district) in the Indian state of Maharashtra. It is an industrial town located some 45 km north of Virar, on the Western

Railway line of Mumbai Suburban Division (Mumbai Suburban Railway). Tarapur can be reached from Boisar, the nearest railway station. It is 20 km off National Highway NH-8.

== Geography ==
Tarapur is located at 19.86°N 72.68°E. It has an average elevation of 10 metres (33feet).

== Economy ==
=== Atomic power stations ===
The Tarapur nuclear power station houses two boiling water reactors (BWRs), each of 200 MW (De-rated to 160MW), the first in Asia, and a recent unit with two pressurised heavy water reactors each of 540 MW. This PHWR based power station is not only the largest nuclear power reactor in the country but also the largest power unit in India. It was commissioned seven months ahead of schedule, at a cost much lower than the original estimate, by the Nuclear Power Corporation of India.

Tarapur Atomic Power Station (320 MW) (T.A.P.S.) was constructed by the American companies Bechtel and GE near village Akkarpatti. The new reactors (1080 MW) were constructed by Larsen & Toubro and Gammon India. Both these power stations are operated by Nuclear Power Corporation of India Limited. The personnel operating the power plant live in a residential complex called T. A. P. S. Township. This residential complex is a fifteen-minute drive from Boisar, the nearest railway station. The residential complex was also constructed by Bechtel to house both Indian and American employees. Because it was the home to American engineers and technicians, the residential complex had a very American small-town look, with neat sidewalks, spacious houses, a club with tennis courts, gyms and swimming pool, a commissary etc. While the original American residents have long gone, the colony continues to thrive.

=== Industrial estate ===
Tarapur also houses two huge industrial estates Maharashtra Industrial Development Corporation, Tarapur Industrial Estate and Additional Tarapur Industrial Estate), which include bulk drug manufacturing units, specialty chemical manufacturing units like JSW Steel Ltd, Aarti Industries plants and a few textile plants.

==== Gas-fired power station ====
MIDC has proposed a gas-fired power station for captive use at Tarapur Industrial Area. MIDC has decided to explore the concept of group captive power plant (GCPP) as proposed in the Electricity Act of 2003. Subsequently, MIDC appointed PricewaterhouseCoopers as consultant to study the concept of GCPPs.

==== Environment ====
The first "Common Effluent Treatment Plant" (CETP) in Maharashtra came up at Tarapur. Tarapur Industrial Manufacturers' Association is responsible for planting saplings. Tarapur, according to the central pollution control board, emerged as the most polluted industrial cluster.

==== Demographics ====
As of 2001 India census, Tarapur had a population of 7012. Males constitute 50% of the population and females 50%. Tarapur has a literacy rate of 91% for both males and females, much higher than the national average of 72%. In Tarapur, 11% of the population is under 6 years of age.

Among minority languages, Gujarati is spoken by 15.68% of the population and Hindi by 26.78%.

== Education ==
- Atomic Energy Central Schools, Tarapur
- Teens World Corporate School
- Tarapur Vidya Mandir & Jr. College
- R.H.SAVE VIDYALAYA

== Attractions ==
Two beaches lay about four kilometres west from Tarapur. Well known is the Tarapur beach with a dilapidated fort which was in a ruined state in 1862, part of the north wall having fallen. The Tarapur Fort, with wells and gardens within, was given in inam (a grant of real estate) by the Peshwa to Vikaji Mehrji, for a hundred years, and is still held by his heirs, and is currently in custody of Chorge family. Another beautiful site is the Chinchani beach, one and a half kilometres north of the fort.

== Nearby towns ==
- Boisar
- Chinchani
- Vangaon
- Umroli
- Palghar
- Dahanu Road

== See also ==
- Tarapore
