= Satpati =

Village in Maharashtra

- village
- Location in Maharashtra, India Satpati (India)
- Coordinates: 19°43′0″N 72°42′0″E
- Country: India
- State: Maharashtra
- District: Palghar

Languages
  - Official: Marathi
- Time zone: UTC+5:30 (IST)
- PIN: 401405
- Palghar: Mumbai

Satpati is a fishing village on the western coast of India, about 80 km north of Mumbai in the Palghar Taluka of District Palghar in Maharashtra. The main occupation in Satpati is fishing, with large exports abroad. The majority of the population are from the Koli community.

== History ==
During Somnath Looting by Mohd. Gazanavi Somnath refugees took shelter in the 11th century by Gujarati Somnath Junagad Mali. Followed Maharashtrian customs instead Gujarati.

The most commonly spoken languages in Satpati are Mangeli and Vaity.

== Transport links ==
The nearest railway station is Palghar (Western Railway), where State Transport (S.T.) buses are available for Satpati at regular intervals. 6/7-seater autorickshaws (that most of the time carry more than 10 people) also run between Satpati and Palghar on a regular basis.

== Temples ==
Ram Mandir and Agni Mata are two of the main temples in the village. Ram Mandir is situated at the entry point of the village while Agni Mata is in the sea.

== Festival ==
Many Festival like Dusshera, Diwali and Navratri are celebrated in this village, such as Holi and Ram Navami.

According to legend, Holi conveys the message of victory of good over evil. On this day, the festival is meant to bring all people together to forget their differences and celebrate. It is done in the same way all the villagers come together and burn Holika and pray to God that sorrow, poverty, and hated be burnt in the fire.

Ram Navami is celebrated on for 3 days with a big fair is held in the village. The fair starts in the evening and lasts from 3 to 4 AM. The first day which is the day when Lord Shri Rama is Born, and the next day Lord Shri Rama's palanquin travels all over the village. When the palanquin moves around the village, the villagers shower flowers on the palanquin and dance to the sound of banjo.

- Women in Fisheries Series No.2
