= Sai Baba Boulevard =

Sai Baba Town
- city
- Location in Maharashtra, India
- Coordinates: 19.8000°N 72.7500°E
- Country: India
- State: Maharashtra
- District: Palghar
- Established: 2013
- Founder: Arun Muchhala International Group

Languages
  - Official: Marathi
- Time zone: UTC+5:30 (IST)
- Postal code: 401501/02/03/04/05/06
- Vehicle registration: MH-48
- Website: http://www.arunmuchhalagroups.com/

Sai Baba Town is an eco-friendly township located in Boisar, Maharashtra. It is an integrated township project on 110 acres of land with industrial and residential plots, designed by the architect Rushikesh H.

== History ==
The construction of Sai Baba Town was started in 2015 by Suraj Muchhala, Managing Director of Arun Muchhala International Group. This group was established in 1971 by the founder, Shri Arun Muchhala.

== The township ==
Sai Baba Town has 17 industrial units, 195 residential complexes with a total of 3000 flats approximately and 832 retail shops, secondary school, college, nursing home, a modern party lawn, religious centre and a senior citizens park.

== Completed Township Projects in Mumbai ==
Sai Baba Park - Malad

Sai Baba Nagar - Borivali

Sai Baba Dham - Borivali

Sai Baba Vihar Complex - Thane

Sai Baba Enclave - Goregaon (W)

Sai Baba Complex - Goregaon (E)

Sai Baba Tower - Andheri (W)

Sai Suraj - Andheri (W)

== Upcoming Projects ==
Suraj Plaza, Thane (Luxury Hotel)

Sai Baba Valley, Lonavala (40 acre township)

Sai Baba Industrial Park, Boisar

== Awards ==
Sai Baba Town won the 'Best Integrated Township' award at the 29th National Real Estate Awards held by Accommodation Times.
