= Tarapur fort =

Fortress in India

Tarapur Fort
- Tarapur, Palghar District, Maharashtra, India

Site information
- Owner: Portugal (1553–1739); Maratha Empire (1739–1803); British Raj (1803–1947); Government of India (1947–present)
- Open to the public: Yes

Location
- Shown within Maharashtra Tarapur Fort (India)
- Coordinates: 19°51′49″N 72°40′56″E

Tarapur Fort is a fortress situated in Tarapur in Palghar District in the Indian state of Maharashtra.

== History ==
=== Early history ===
Tarapur Fort is first mentioned roughly around the year 1280, where the ruler of Mahikavati, or modern day Mahim, Bhima of Mahikavati, captured the fort from the Naiks.

=== Portuguese occupation ===
In the year 1553, the Portuguese captured Tarapur Fort and the surrounding area. Tarapur, being a trading town, generated much wealth to the Portuguese, and served as a lucrative outpost for trade in the Western Coast of Maharashtra. The Portuguese were able to repel attacks from the Abyssinians in 1559 and the Mughal Empire in 1612. The Portuguese built a stockade made of palm trees to house the Governor of the fort, with bamboo matting and scaffolding. They also constructed an artillery fortification, and established a Mission of Dominican Friars to convert the local residents. The Portuguese overhauled the fort one last time in 1733.

=== Maratha control ===
In the 1730s, Chimaji Appa, a commander of the Maratha Army and brother of Baji Rao I, began a campaign to conquer the Western Coast of Maharashtra under the Maratha Empire, such as attacking and controlling Belapur Fort in the year 1733. On, 24 January 1739, Chimaji Appa lead an assault on the fortress. 4 mines were placed in the fortress for the Marathas to breach inside. The explosion of the mines damaged a bastion and a curtain wall. The Portuguese attempted a heavy resistance, however, the battle was won by Chimaji after the Portuguese were diverted away from the attacking Maratha force. The Marathas repaired the walls of the fortress following the battle.

=== British occupation ===
After the successful assault on the fortress and the following Maratha control for 64 years, the British attacked Tarapur in 1803, gaining control of the fortress.

=== Modern day ===
Approximately after the fort's capture by the Marathas, The Peshwa granted the fortress to the custodianship of Vikaji Mehrji, whose descendants, the Chorge family, continue to hold.

== Description ==
Not much is known about the Tarapur Fort's composition before the Portuguese occupation of the site. A description of the fort in the year 1728 by the Portuguese yielded that it was heptagonal in shape, and had 4 redoubts. The fort's walls were of low height and had no parapets. After the Maratha siege, the south and southeast sides of the fort were changed or repaired by the Marathas, due to the presence of differently arranged stonework. 2 graineries, a guard room, and several wells are also located within Tarapur Fort.
