= Boisar railway station =

Railway Station in Maharashtra, India

Boisar

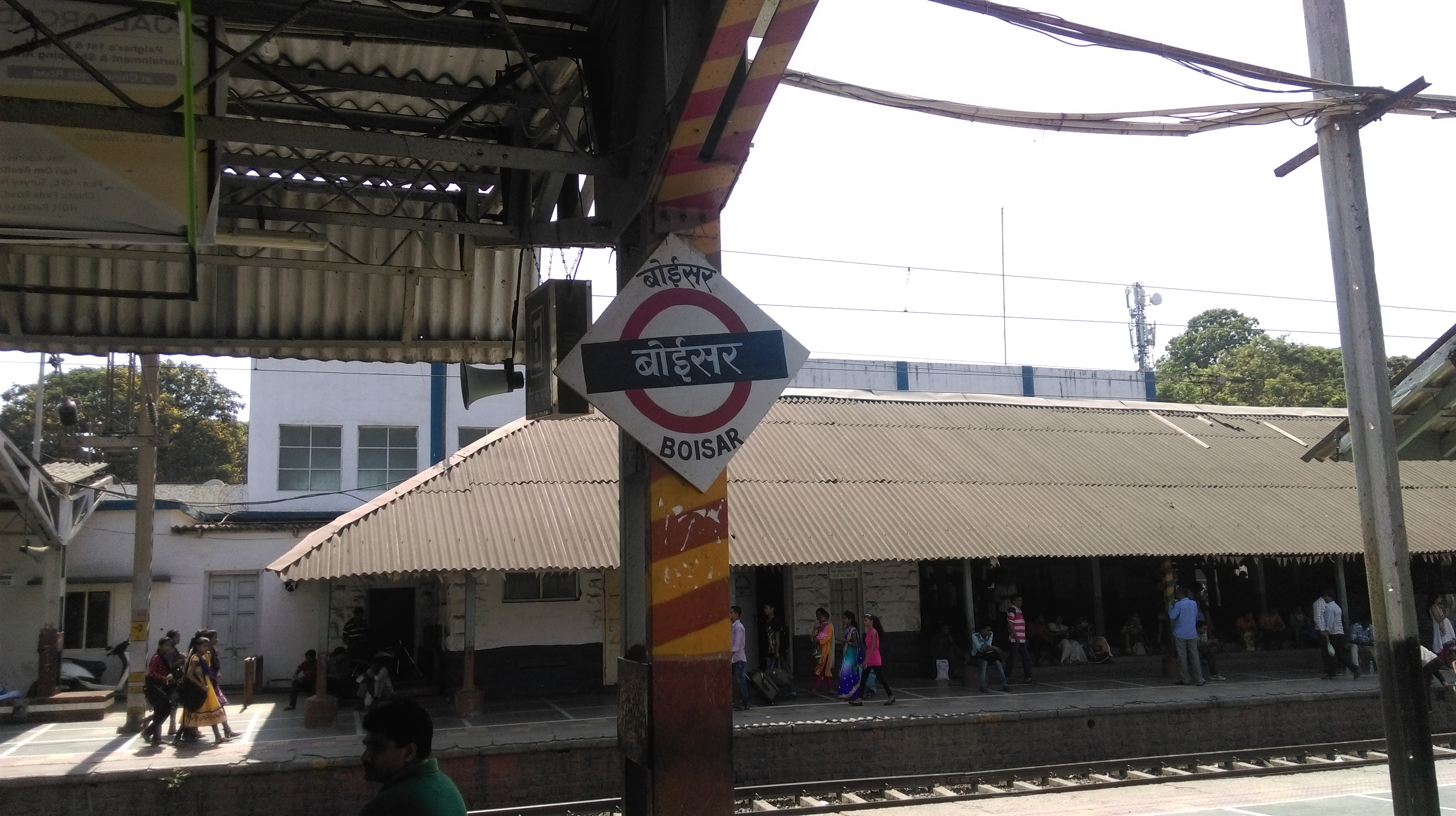

General information
- Location: Boisar, Maharashtra; India
- Coordinates: 19.7984°N 72.7615°E
- Elevation: 15.300 metres (50.20 ft)
- Owner: Ministry of Railways, Indian Railways
- Line: Western Line
- Platforms: 3
- Tracks: 6
- Bus routes: Mumbai - Ahmedabad route

Construction
- Structure type: Standard on-ground station
- Platform levels: 1
- Parking: W.R. Paid Parking
- Cycle facilities: Yes

Other information
- Status: Active
- Station code: BOR
- Fare zone: Western Railways

Services
Preceding station	Mumbai Suburban Railway	Following station
Umroli towards Churchgate	Western line	Vangaon towards Dahanu Road
Route map
Location
- Location within Maharashtra

Boisar Railway Station is located in Boisar and is a major hub for the Mumbai Suburban Railway.

The station has three platforms, parking space, and basic amenities like restrooms and drinking water.

Boisar is known for its proximity to the Tarapur Atomic Power Station and the scenic Tarapur Beach, making it a popular destination for visitors, It is also a terminus for the Boisar - Vasai Road–Roha line.

Trains at this station are the main mode of transportation for the population of here and Tarapur, It is a major railway station on Western Railway, due to its high passenger and goods traffic, as it is the closest station to one of the biggest MIDC of Maharashtra, situated in Palghar district. This station has a dedicated good yards as well.

As of 2025, the railway station is under major redevelopment and construction for new station building, new good loading yards and new home platforms for Mumbai Suburban Railway, which will boost the connectivity and frequency of trains between Boisar and Mumbai and more Express trains will have stoppages here.

== History ==
Boisar was listed as a station on the first train service of the BB&CI Railway between Grant Rd and Ahmedabad, when the line opened on 28 November 1864.

== Major Trains ==
Some of the major superfast/express trains which have a halt here
Train No. & Name	Type	Zone
22953/54 Gujarat Express	Superfast	WR
22927 Lok Shakti Express	Superfast	WR
20931/32 Thiruvananthapuram North–Indore Weekly Express	Superfast	WR
22193/94 Daund–Gwalior Weekly Superfast Express	Superfast	NCR
20953/54 MGR Chennai Central–Ahmedabad Superfast Express	Superfast	WR
22917/18 Bandra Terminus–Haridwar Express	Superfast	WR
20967/86 Secunderabad–Porbandar Weekly Express	Superfast	WR
12935/36 Bandra Terminus–Surat Intercity Express	Superfast	WR
19037/38 Avadh Express	Express	WR
19015/16 Saurashtra Express	Express	WR
59023/24 Mumbai Central–Valsad Fast Passenger	Fast Passenger	WR

Apart from these trains, 8 MEMU trains halt here.

Trains originating/terminating
Train No. & Name	Type	Origin	Termini	Notes
61002 Dombivli - Boisar MEMU	MEMU	DI 05:49	BOR 08:20	same rake returns as 61001
61001 Boisar - Vasai Road MEMU	MEMU	BOR 08:35	BSR 09:45	gets extended upto Diva from Vasai

== Gallery ==
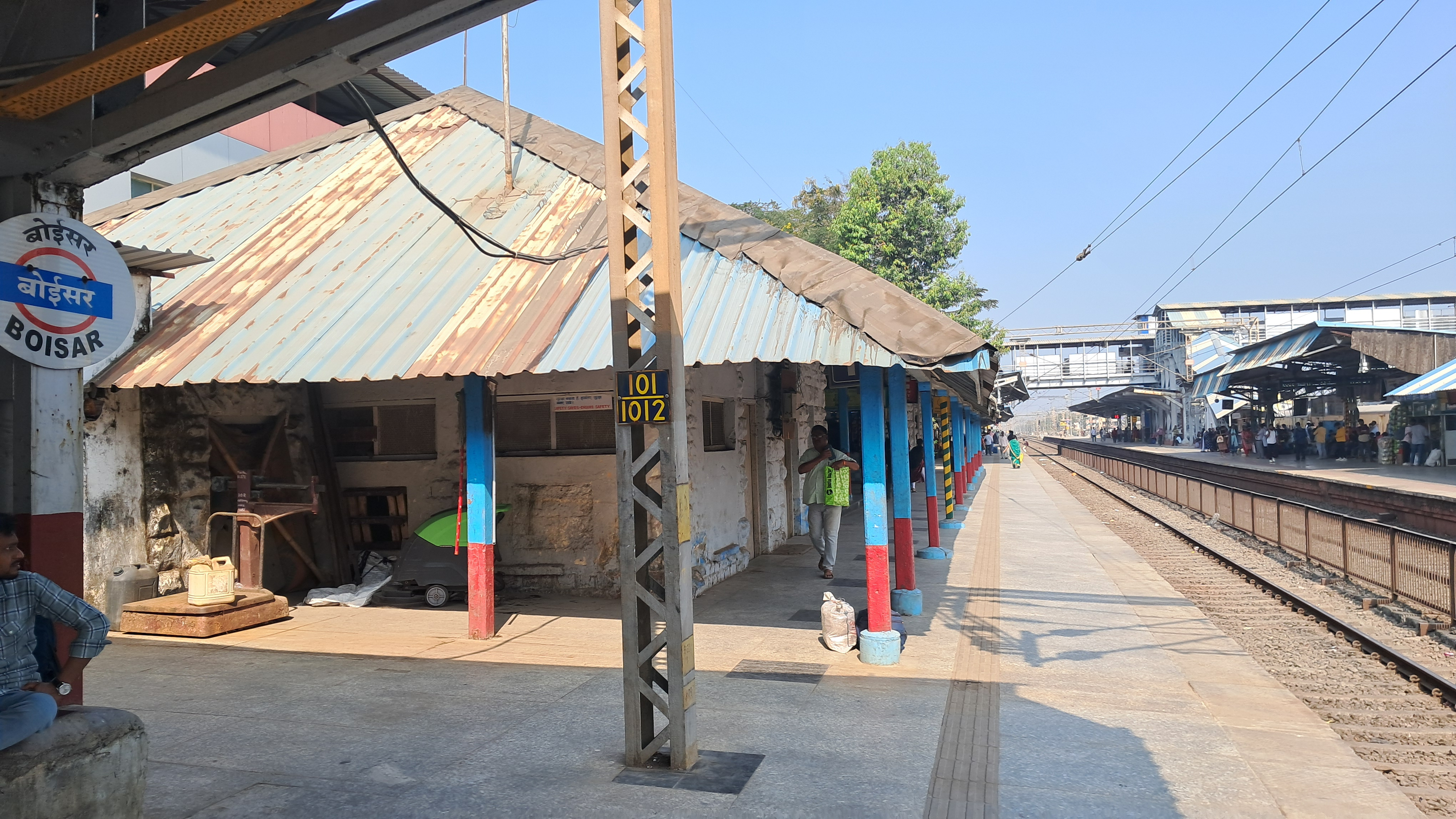
View from south of the old station building

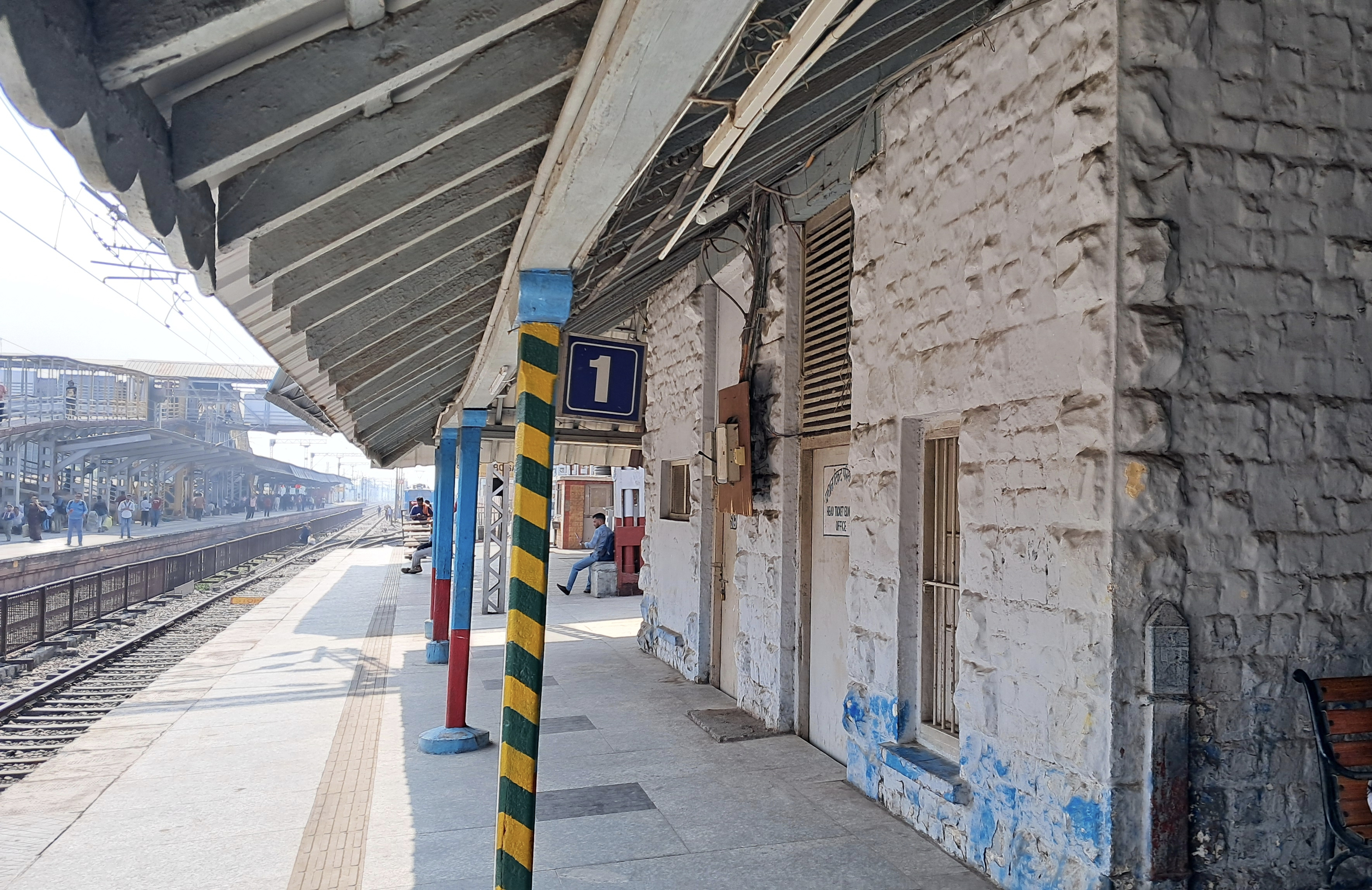
A Southward view of the station building

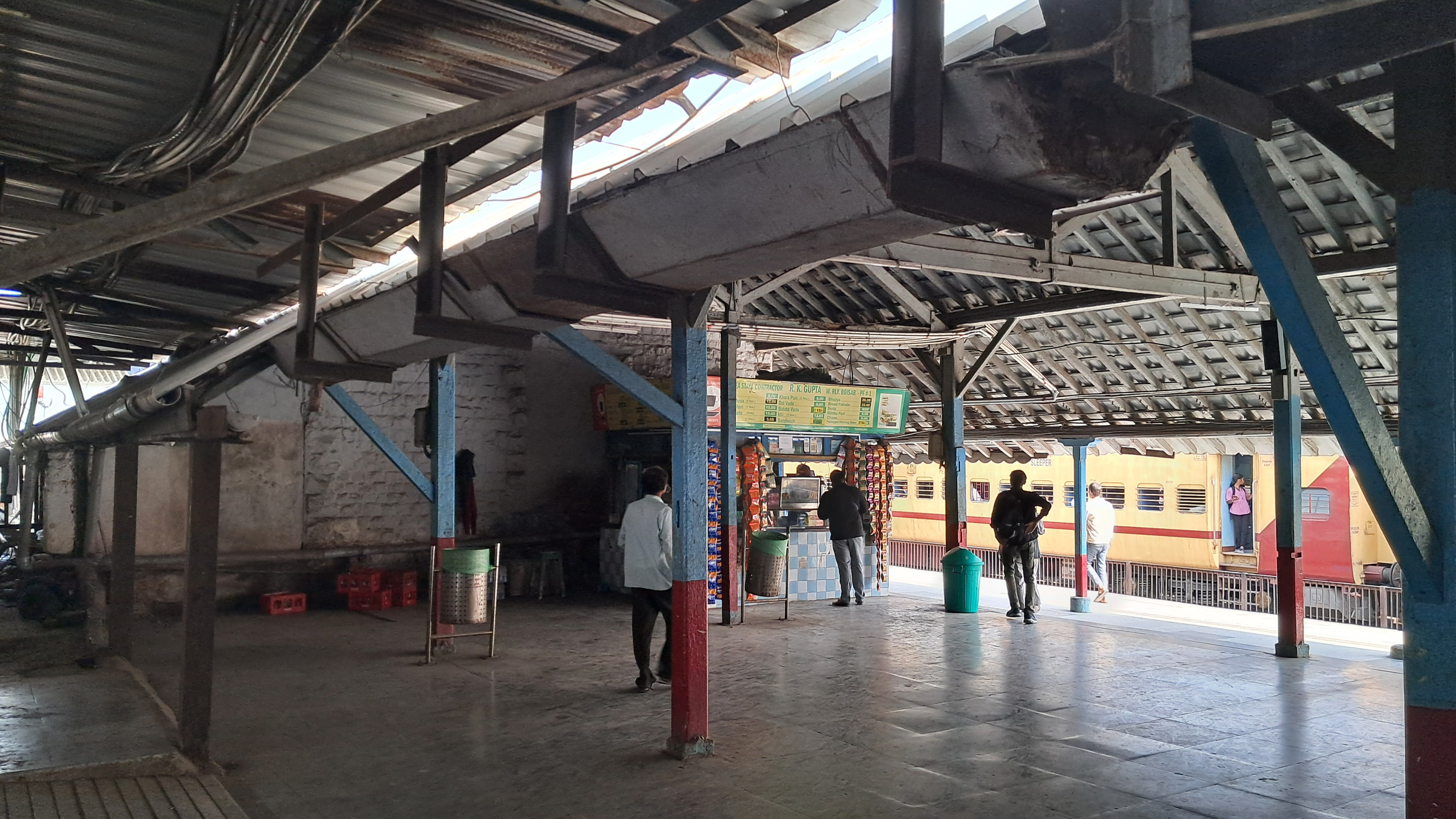
Entry into platform 1 via the old station building.

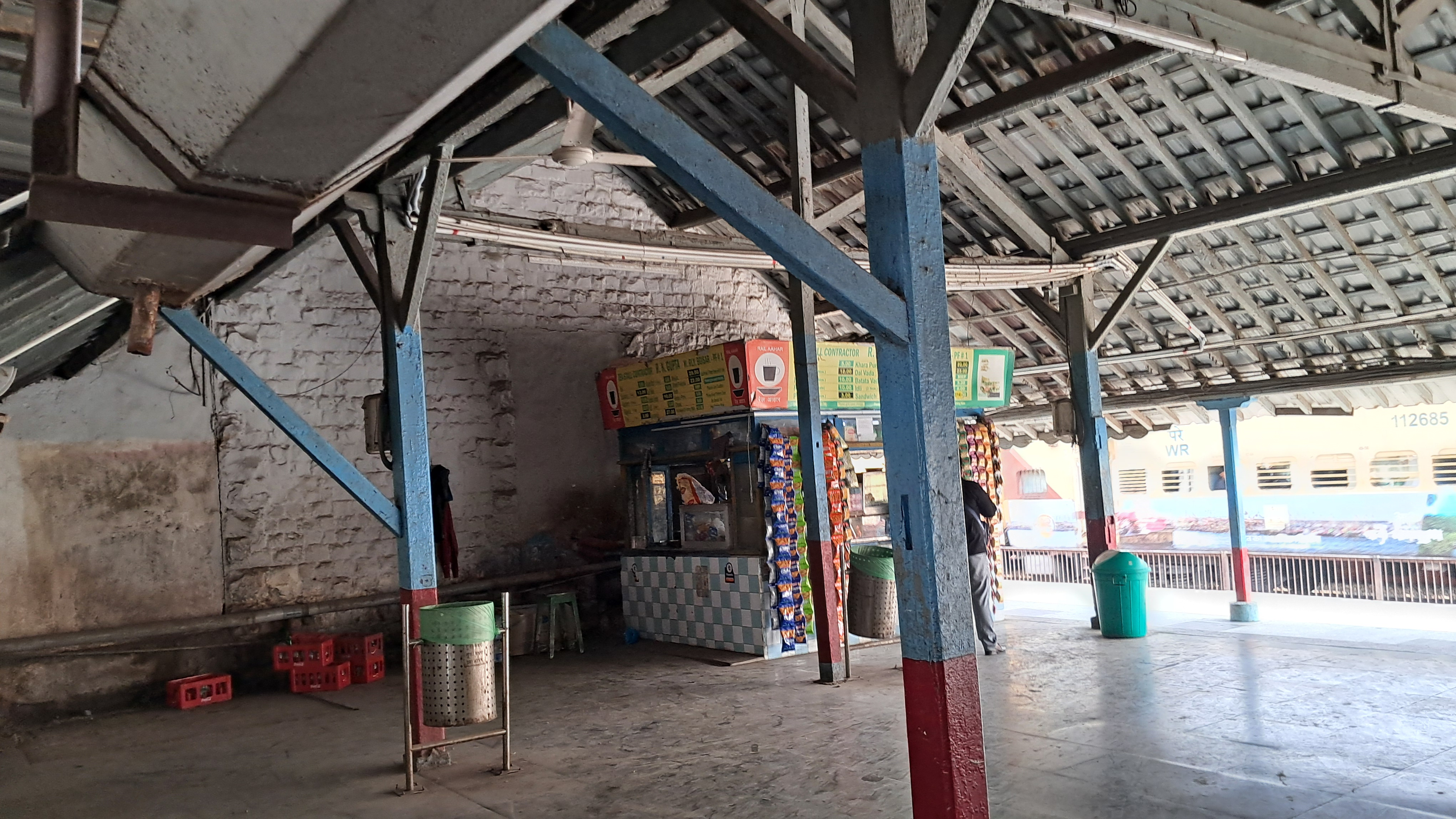
Food stall and waiting area, with roofs supported by wooden beams

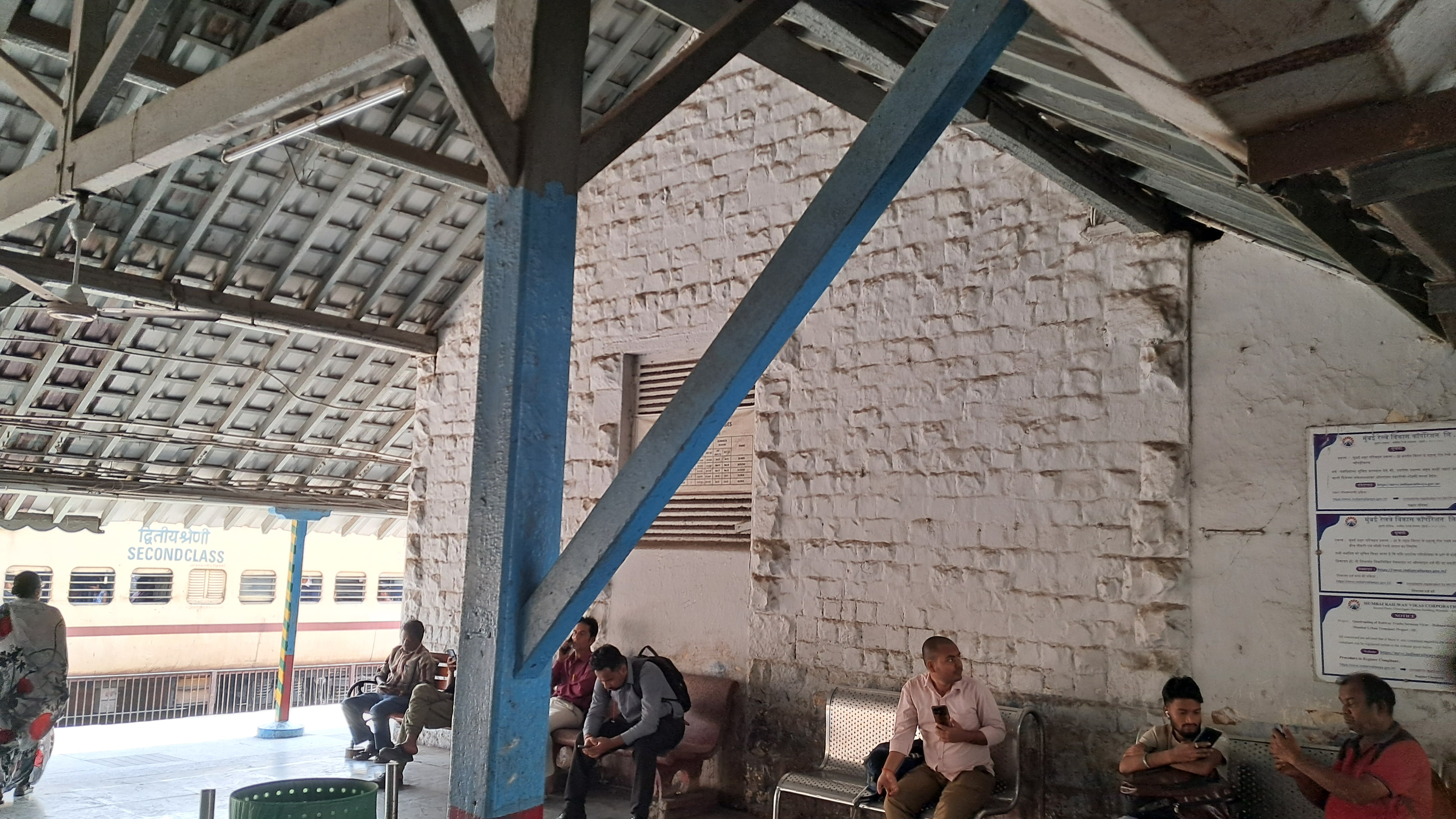
Stone walls and roof of the old building.

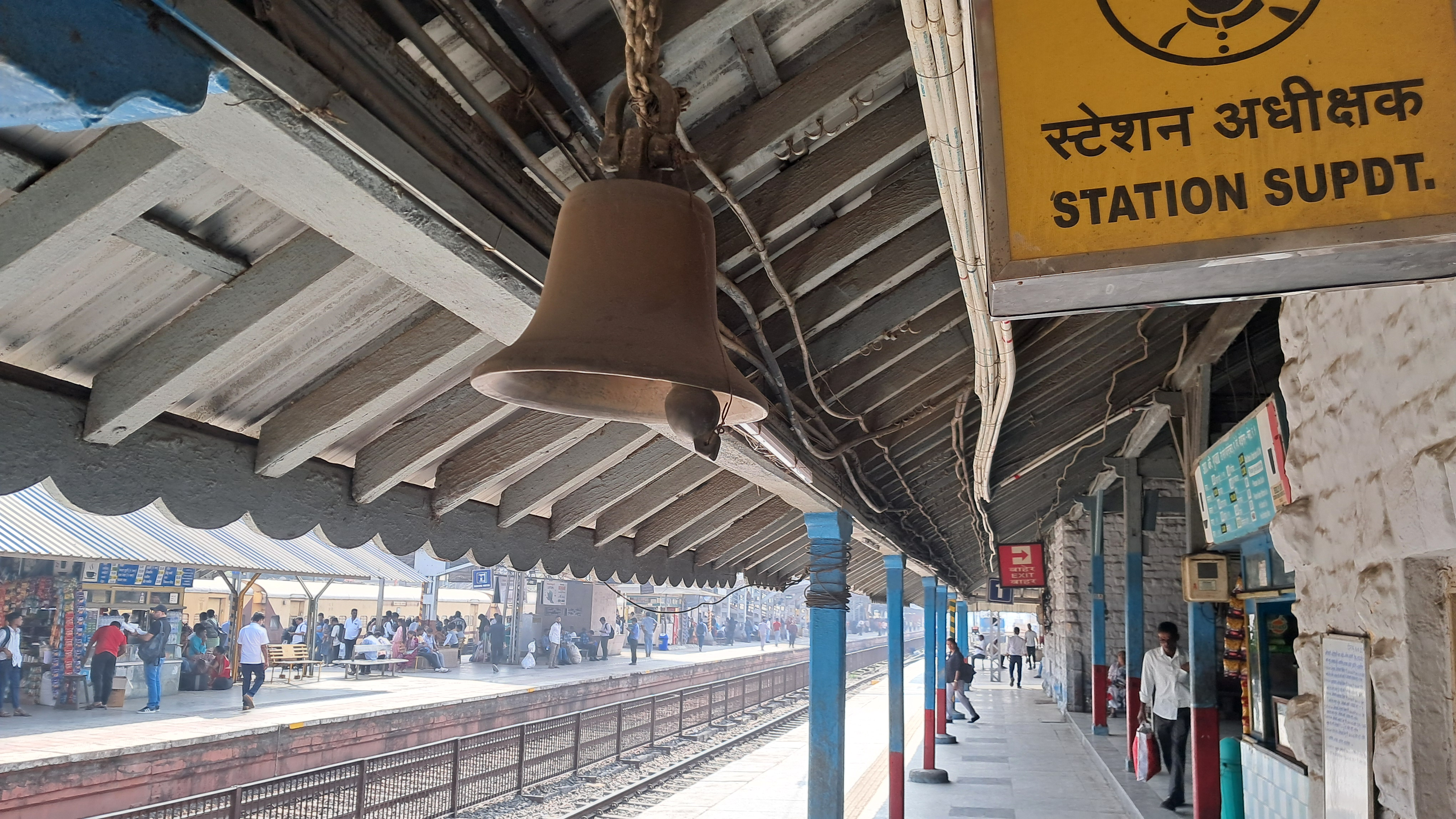
The station bell at Boisar Railway station

Boisar Old Station Building- Under the side roof

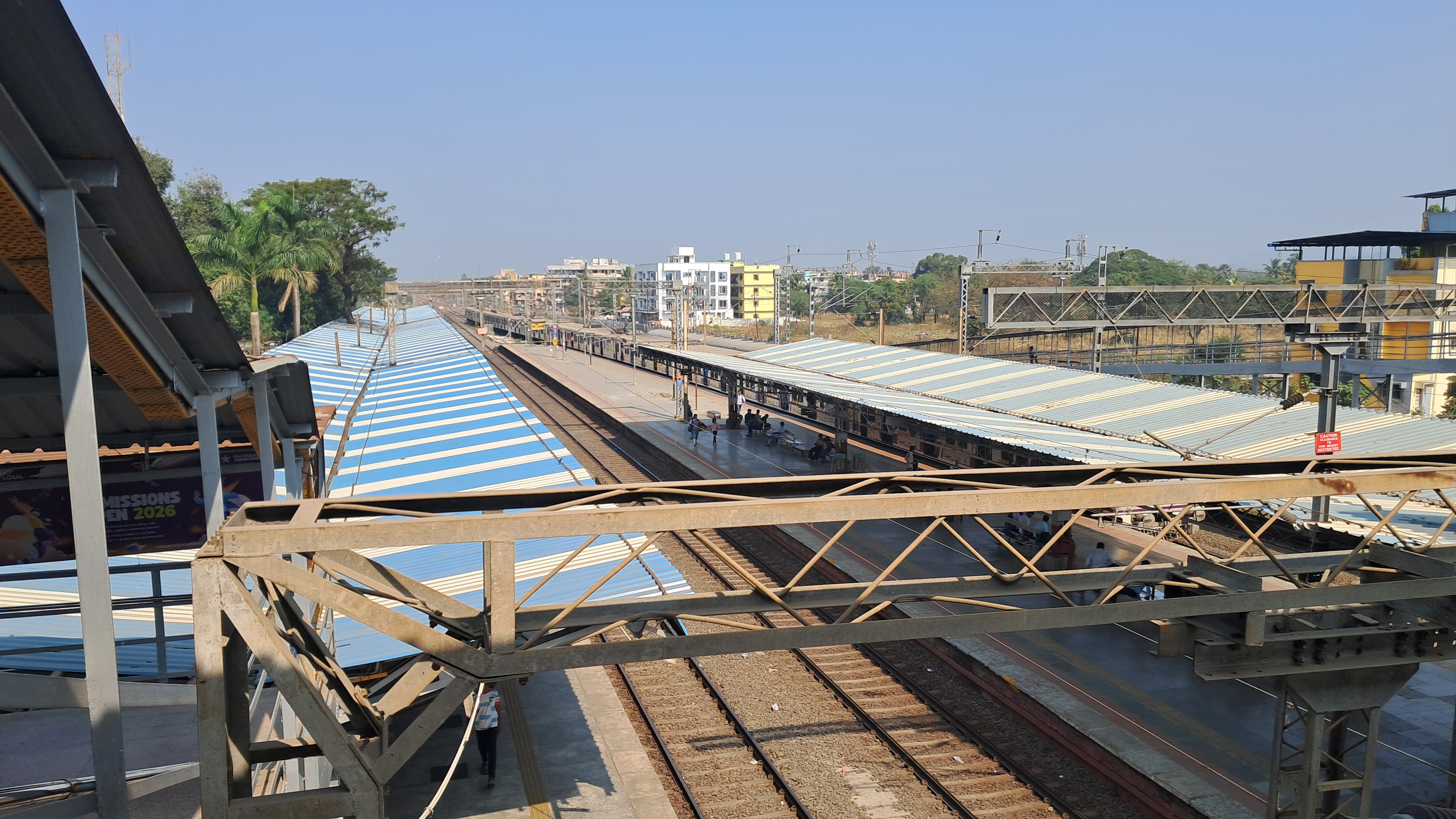
Northward view of Boisar Railway station from FoB

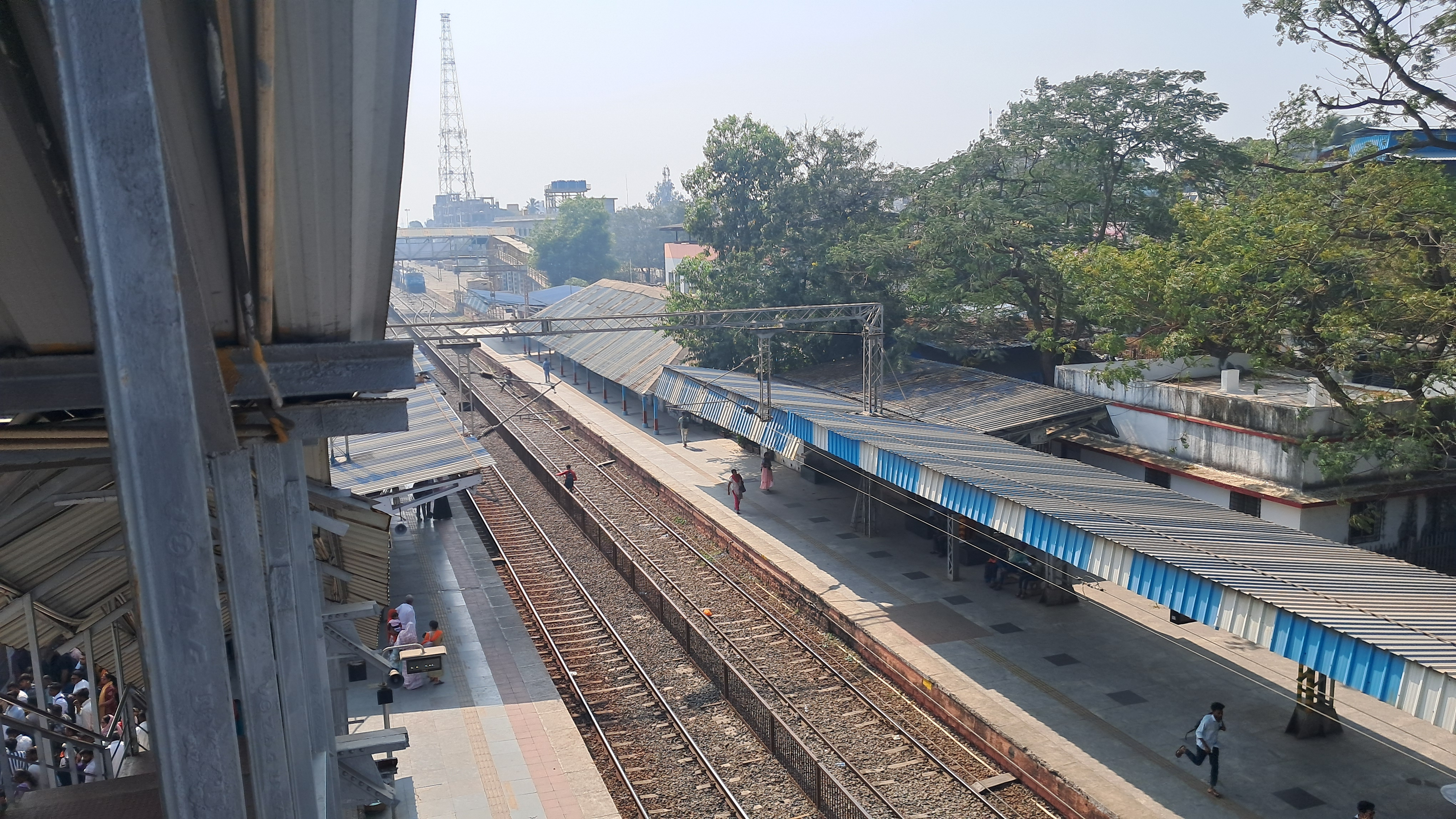
Southward view of Boisar Railway station from FoB

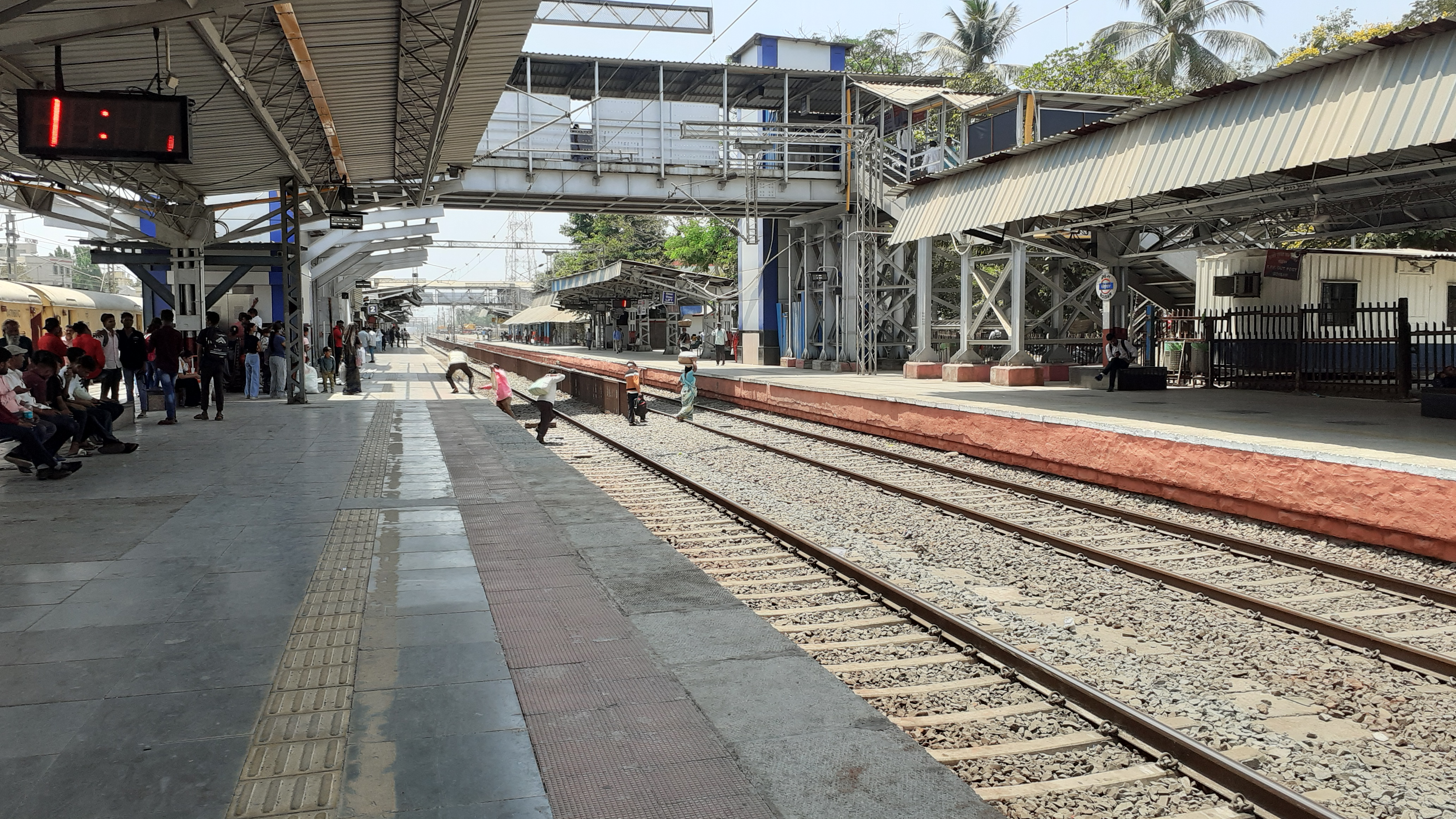
Southward view of Boisar Railway station platform

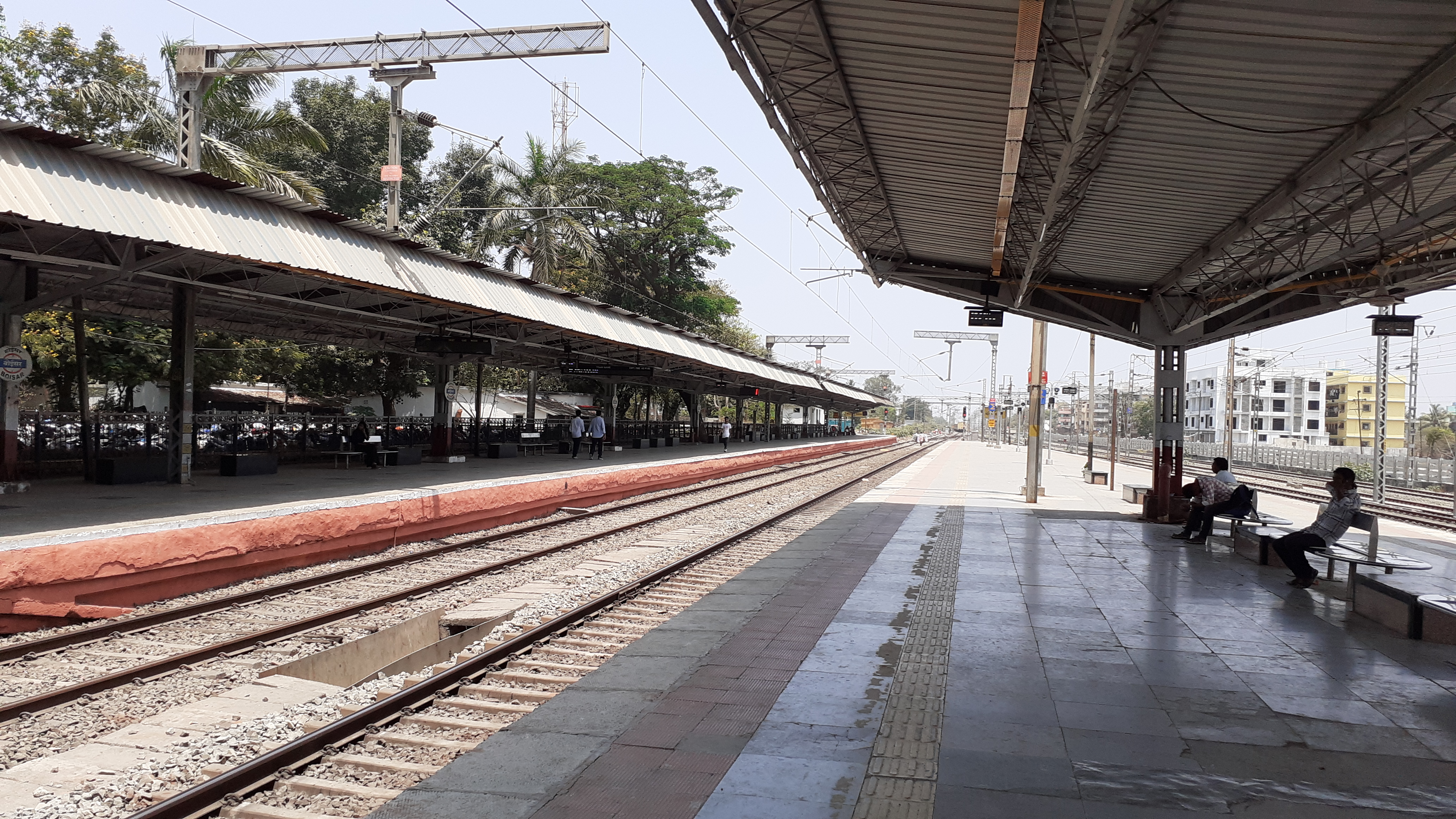
Northward view of Boisar Railway station platform

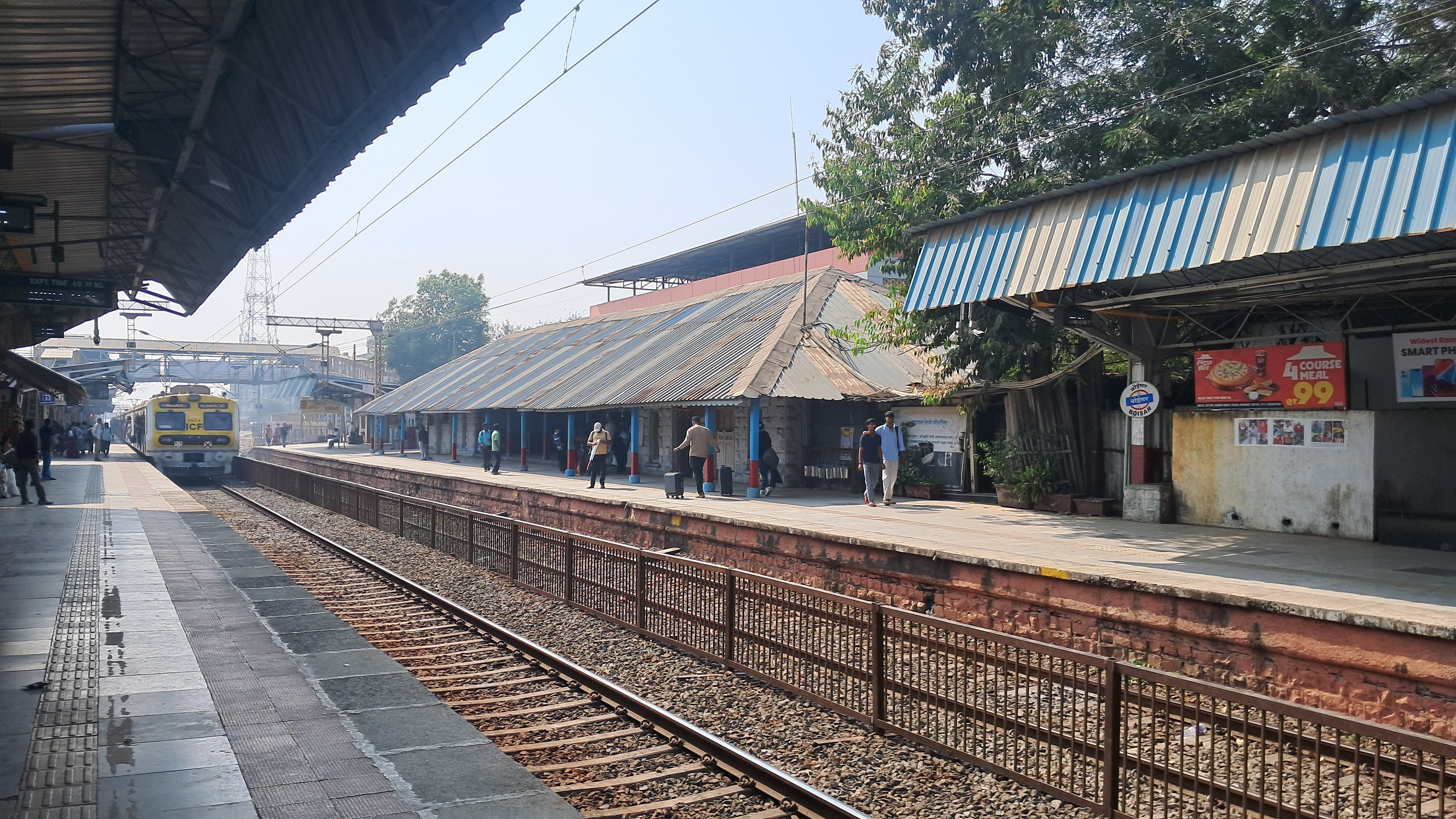
View of a Local entering the station, with the old station building in background

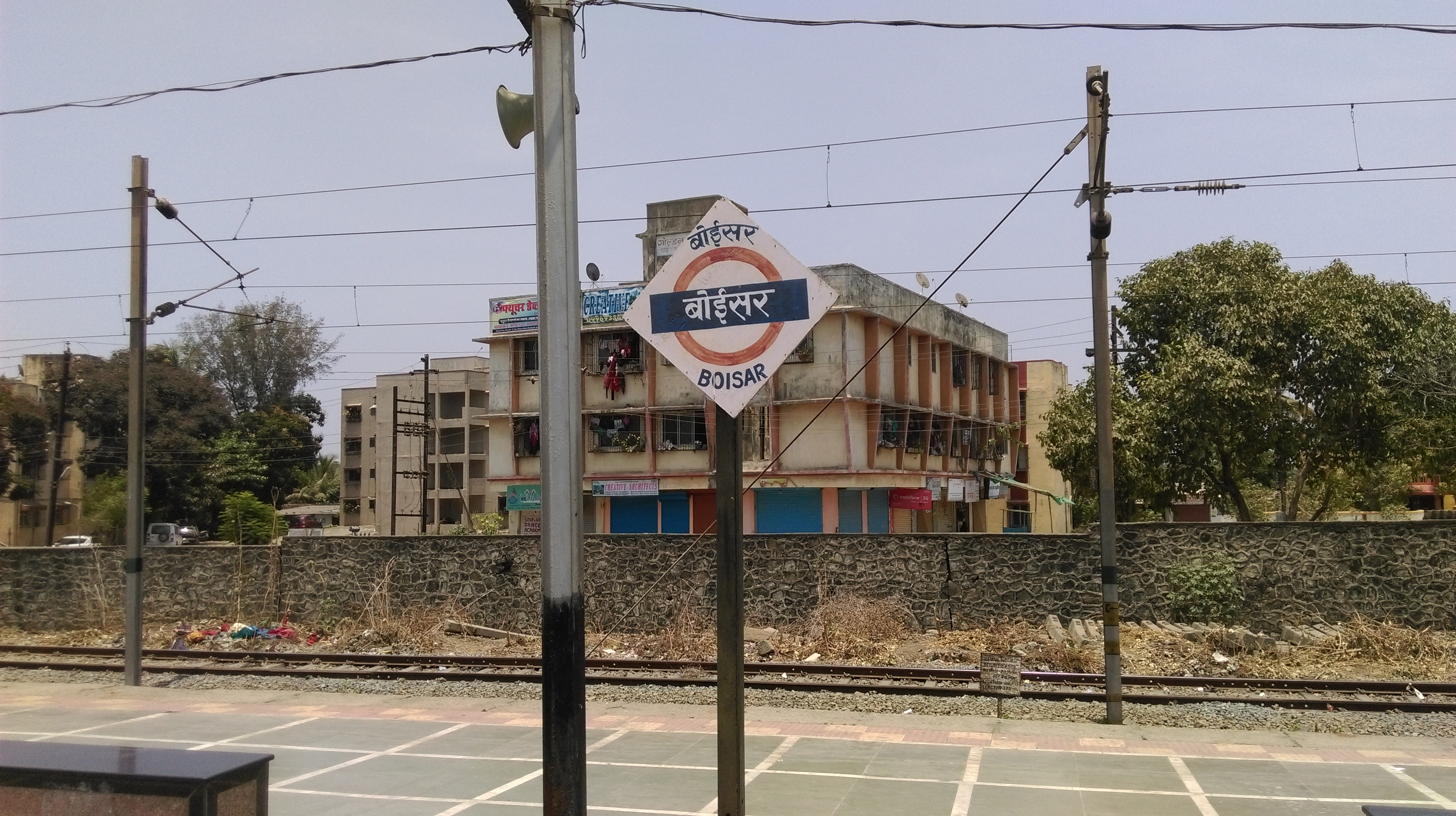
Boisar railway station - Platform board

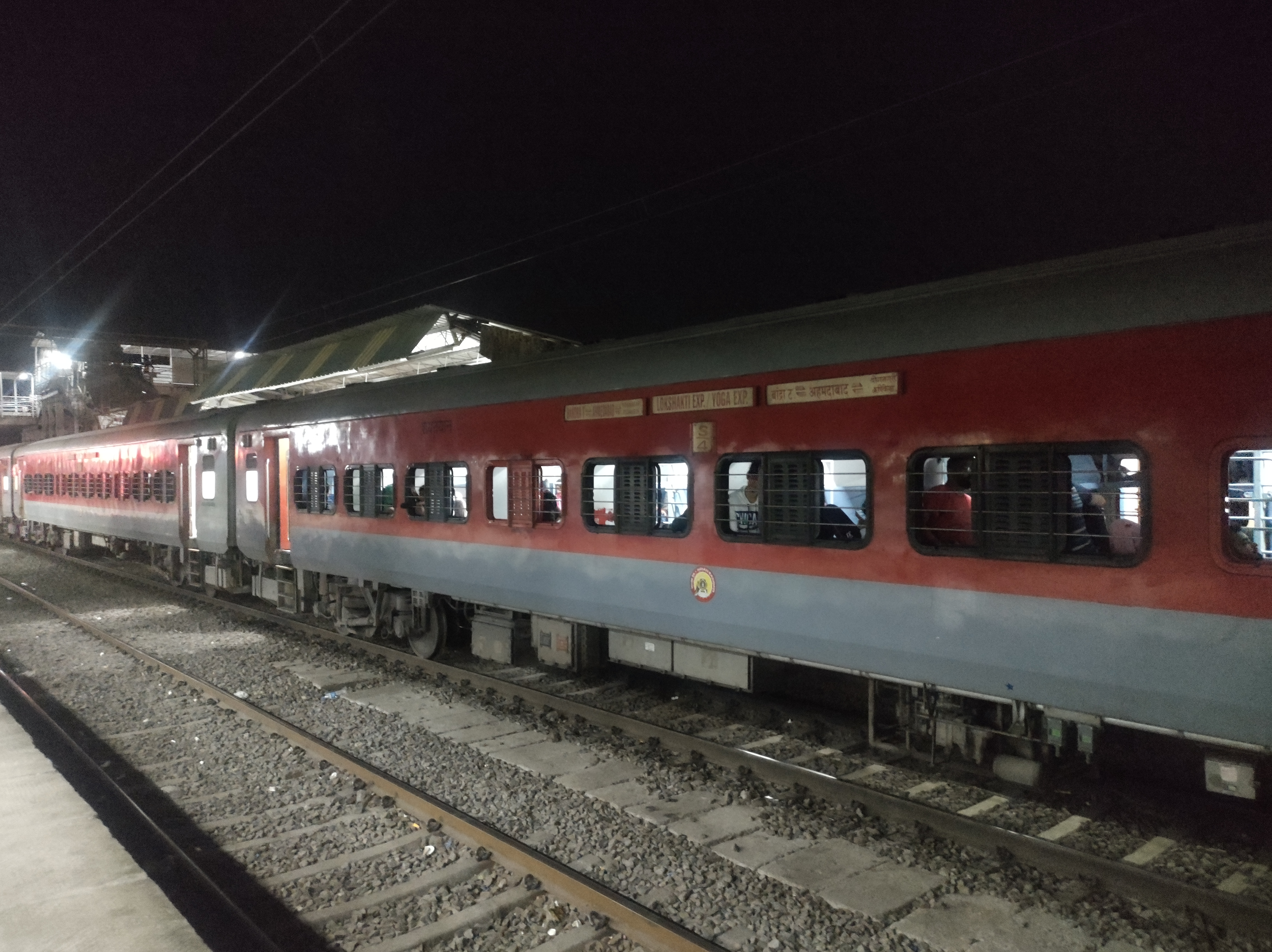
Lok Shakti Express at Boisar station
