= Bhavangad Fort =

Bhavani Gad - Fort

Bhavani Gad Fort
- भवानी गड किल्ला
- Part of Konkan coast
- Palghar district, Maharashtra

Site information
- Type: Sea Fort
- Owner: Government of India
- Controlled by: Maratha Empire (1737-1818); United Kingdom: East India Company (1818-1857); British Indian Empire (1857-1947); India (1947-)
- Open to the public: Yes
- Condition: Ruins

Location
- Shown within Maharashtra Bhavani Gad Fort (India)
- Coordinates: 19°35′03.4″N 72°44′47.9″E
- Height: 165 ft

Site history
- Materials: Black Basalt Stone

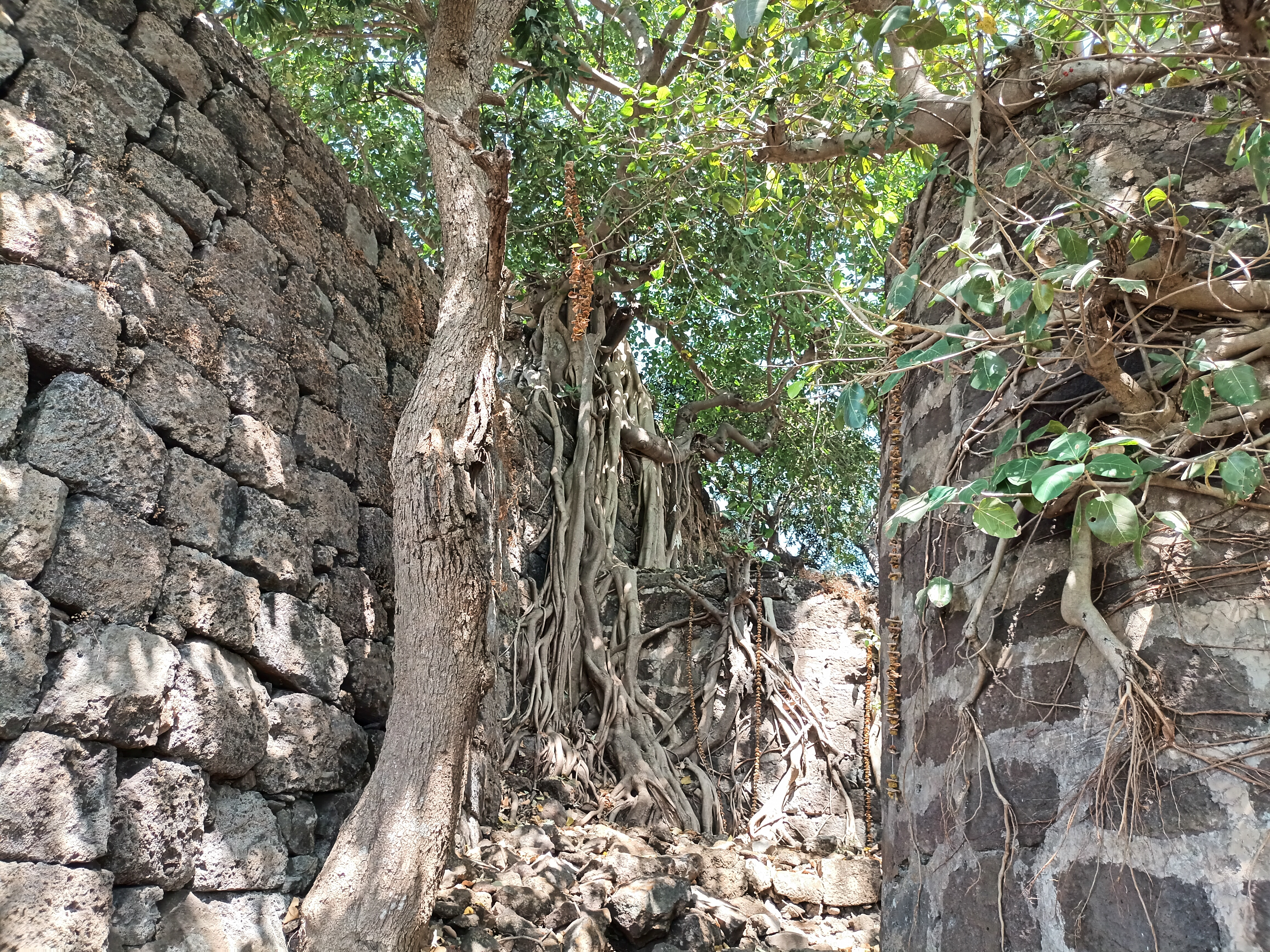
Bhavani Gad Fort

Bhavani Gad Fort (Marathi: भवानगड किल्ला, Hindi: भवानी गड क़िला, transliteration: Bhavа̄ngad Killa) is a fort located at Saphale - Madhukar Nagar 3 km from village Kelve, in Palghar district, of Maharashtra. This fort is in very dilapidated condition. The outer walls, steps, parapets, bastions etc. were built without using limestone at many places. This fort was built to by Shrimant Chimaji Appa Peshave to capture the Fort Bassein by Maratha Army.

== History ==
This fort was built by Shrimant Chimaji Appa Peshave to check the atrocities by Portuguese. This fort was built in 1737, with the help of 2000 laborers. This fort played a prominent role in the conquest of the fort Bassein. This fort was captured by British in 1818.

== Places to see ==
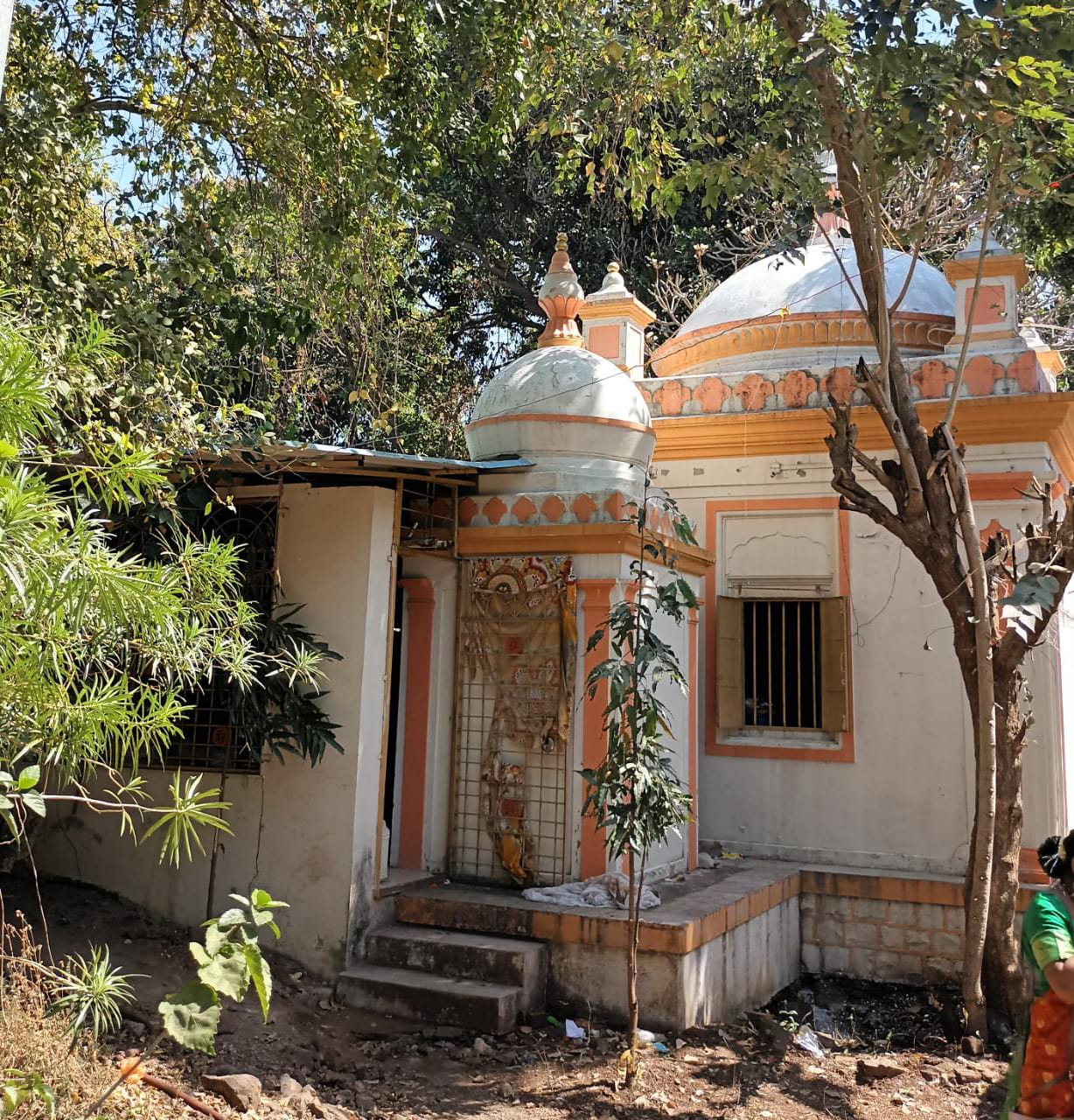
Lord Shiva Tample

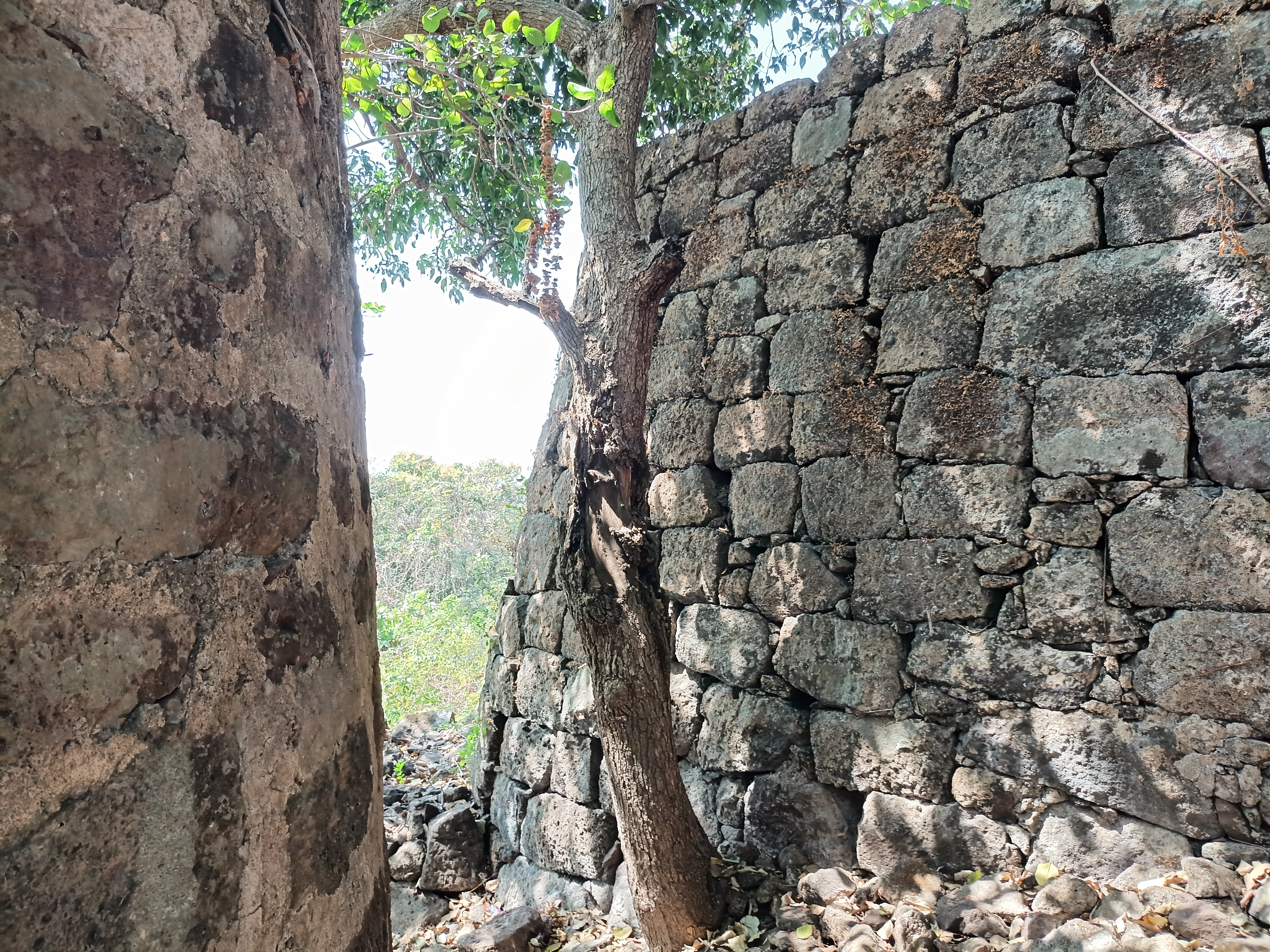
Bhavangad Fort

The Bhavani Gad (भवानीगड) Fort is in a dilapidated state. Few remains of the bastion, fort walls, and the water cistern are seen on the fort. There is a temple of Bhavangadeshwar temple on the highest point on the fort. It takes about an hour to walk around the parapet wall and visit all the places of the fort.

The fort's citadel has a west-facing entrance built in the Gomukhi style. Its arch has collapsed, but the surrounding bastions and fortifications remain intact. Lime mortar has been used in the construction of the citadel's entrance. Inside the entrance, there are guard chambers. Moving forward, one passes through another ruined gateway to enter the citadel. Right ahead, there is a square-shaped water tank carved into the rock. The villagers have built a cement platform beside it. The tank holds a substantial amount of water.

== See also ==
- List of forts in Maharashtra
- List of forts in India
- Chimaji Appa
- Marathi People
- Portuguese India
- List of Maratha dynasties and states
- Battles involving the Maratha Empire
- Maratha Army
- Maratha titles
- Military history of India
