= Tarapore =

Tarapore or Taraporevala (also Taraporewala) is an Indian (Parsi) toponymic surname from Tarapur, Maharashtra. Notable people with the surname include:

- Ardeshir Tarapore (1923–1965), Indian lieutenant colonel in the Indo-Pakistani War of 1965
- Farokh Tarapore (born 1960), Indian sailor
- Keki Tarapore (1910–1986), Indian cricketer
- Keki Tarapore (coach) (1922–2001), Indian cricketer and coach
- Shavir Tarapore (born 1957), Indian cricket umpire
- S. S. Tarapore (1936-2016), deputy governor of the Reserve Bank of India, chairman of the Tarapore committee
- Sooni Taraporevala (born 1957), Indian screenwriter and filmmaker

== See also ==
- Taraporewala Aquarium, India's oldest aquarium in Mumbai
