= Kaldurg Fort =

Fort in Maharashtra, India

- Palghar district, Maharashtra

Site information
- Type: fort
- Open to the public: yes

Location
- Location in Maharashtra
- Location within India Location within Maharashtra
- Coordinates: 19°41′28.7″N 72°49′01.2″E
- Height: 475 metres (1,558 ft)

Kaldurg Fort is east of Palghar, Maharashtra, India, in the Sahyadri mountain range of northern Konkan. Its height is at least 475 meters above sea level, giving views of the Arabian Sea and the industrial town of Palghar to the west, as well as views of the Surya River, to the east.

This rectangular shape of a fort can easily be located from a distance. There is no historic sign. The fort is divided into the upper part and lower part by a rectangular rock. There are a few steps that separate these two parts.
