= Palghar Municipal Council =

Municipal council

Type
- Type: Municipal Council of the Palghar

History
- Founded: 1999

Leadership
- Mayor: Uttam Gharat, Shiv Sena
- Seats: 28

Elections
- Last election: 02-December-2025

Palghar is the municipal council in Palghar district, Maharashtra.

== History ==
The Palghar municipal council established in 1999.

== Municipal Council election ==
=== Electoral performance March 2019 ===
S.No.	Party name	Alliance	Party flag or symbol	Number of Corporators
01	Shiv Sena (SS)	NDA		14
02	Bharatiya Janata Party (BJP)	NDA		07
03	Indian National Congress (INC)	UPA		00
04	Nationalist Congress Party (NCP)	UPA		02
05	Independent	Independent		05
