= Tarapur, Odisha =

Tarapur tarapur tarapur
- town
- Location in Odisha, India Tarapur (India)
- Coordinates: 20.354364°N 86.227248°E
- Country: India
- State: Odisha
- Founder: Fakira Charan panda

Languages
  - Official: Oriya
- Time zone: UTC+5:30 (IST)
- Vehicle registration: OD21
- Website: odisha.gov.in

The town of Tarapur is located in the Indian state of Odisha, on the eastern coast of India. Three stupas (edicts), put up by Emperor Asoka, have been discovered at Tarapur recently. Present posterior to the mountain, a museum houses the old sculpture of the neighbouring Buddhist sites.
