= Tarapur, Madhya Pradesh =

Tarapur
- village
- Location within Madhya Pradesh
- Coordinates: 24°38′05″N 074°50′55″E
- Country: India
- State: Madhya Pradesh
- District: neemuch
- Tehsil: jawad

Population (2011)
  - Total: 3,580

Languages
- Time zone: UTC+5:30 (IST)
- ISO 3166 code: IN-MP
- Vehicle registration: MP-

Tarapur is a village located in neemuch district of Madhya Pradesh, India. It is a centre for the manufacture of fashionable bandanas. Different techniques, such as direct dyeing and printing, resist dyeing and resist printing, rogan printing and screen printing are commonly practiced.

Tarapur is located 3.3 km by road north of Jawad.

In the 2011 census a population of 3,580 was recorded with 1,794 males and 1,786 females.
