= Palghar =

- Town
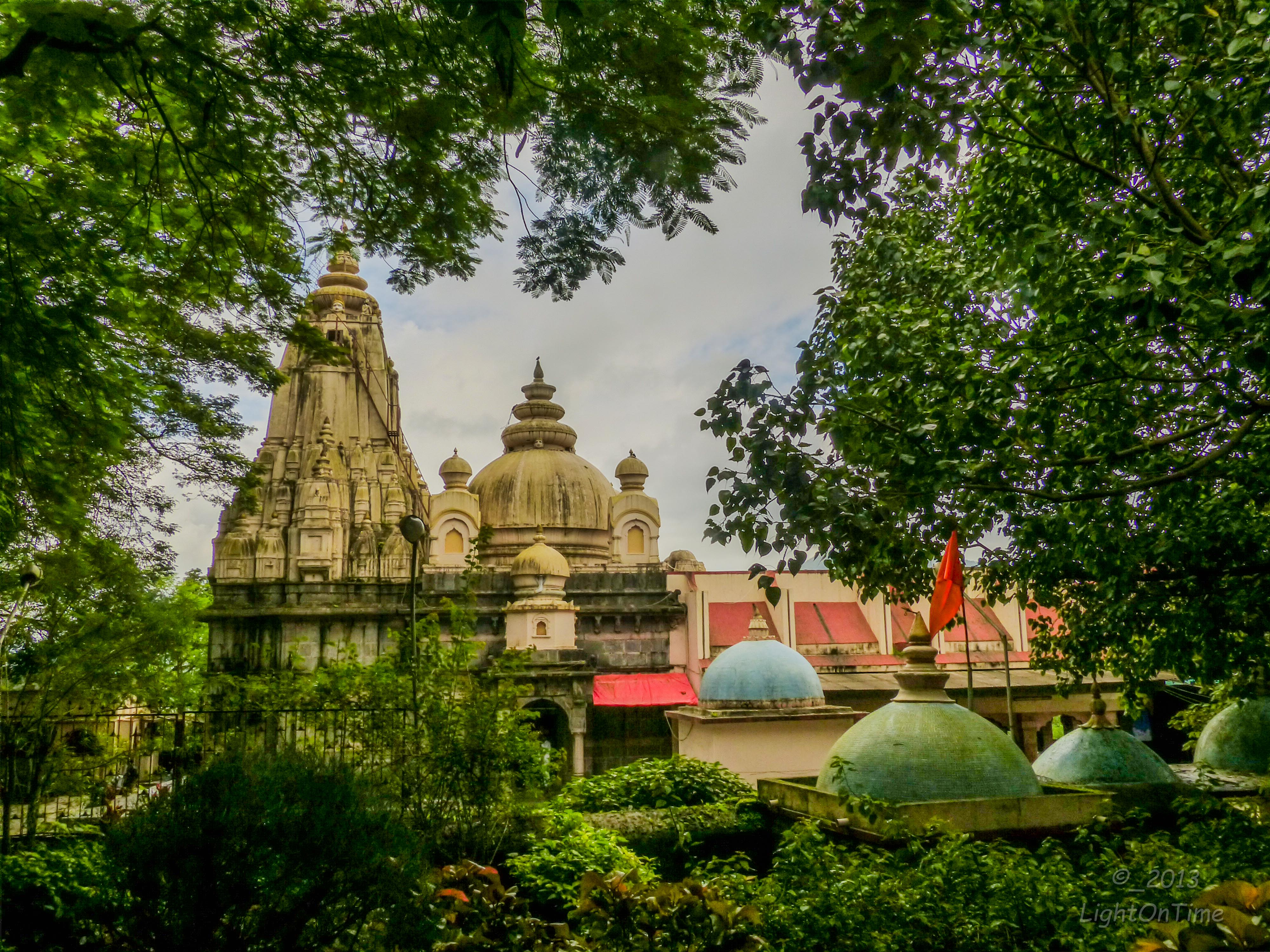
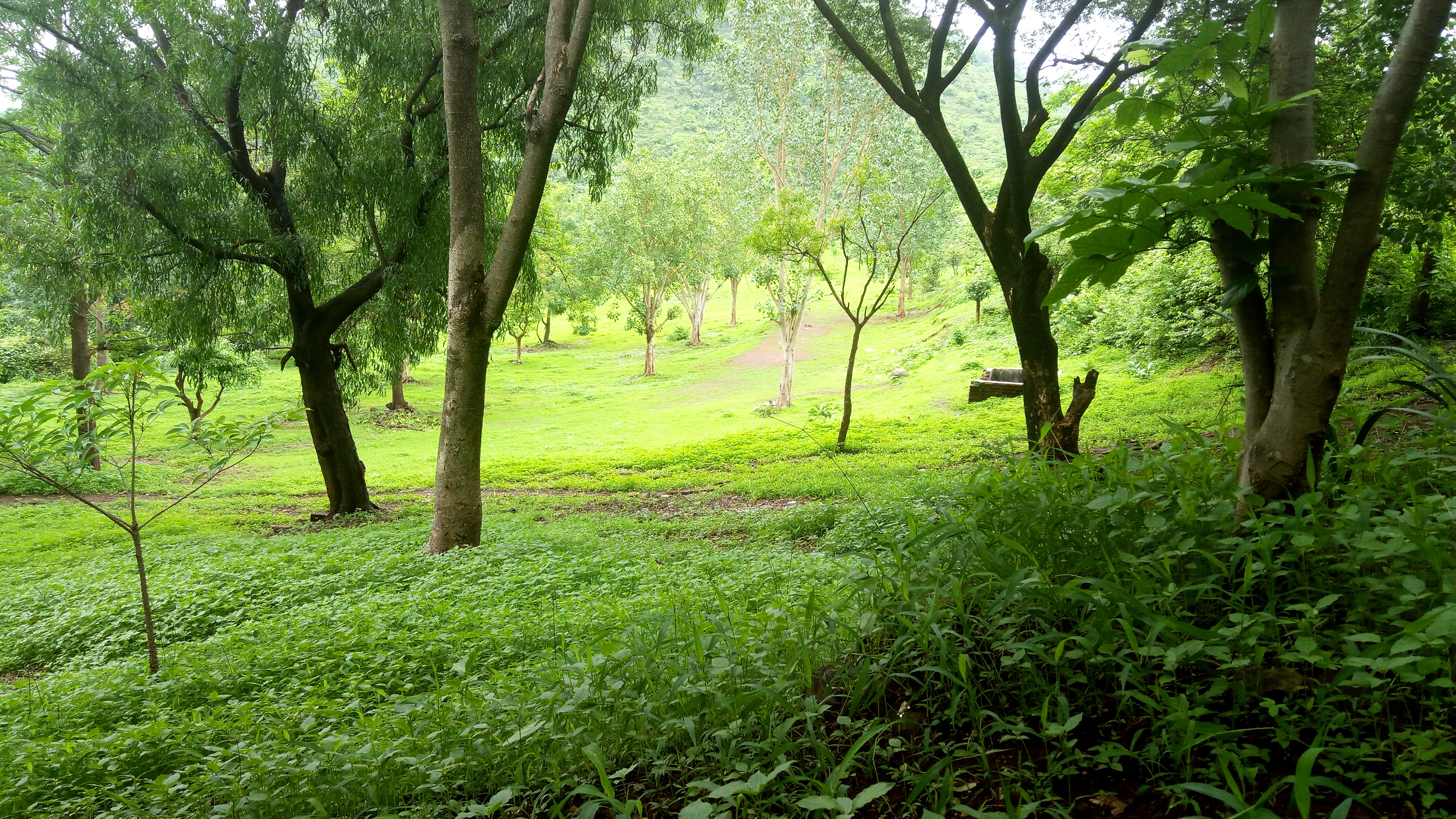
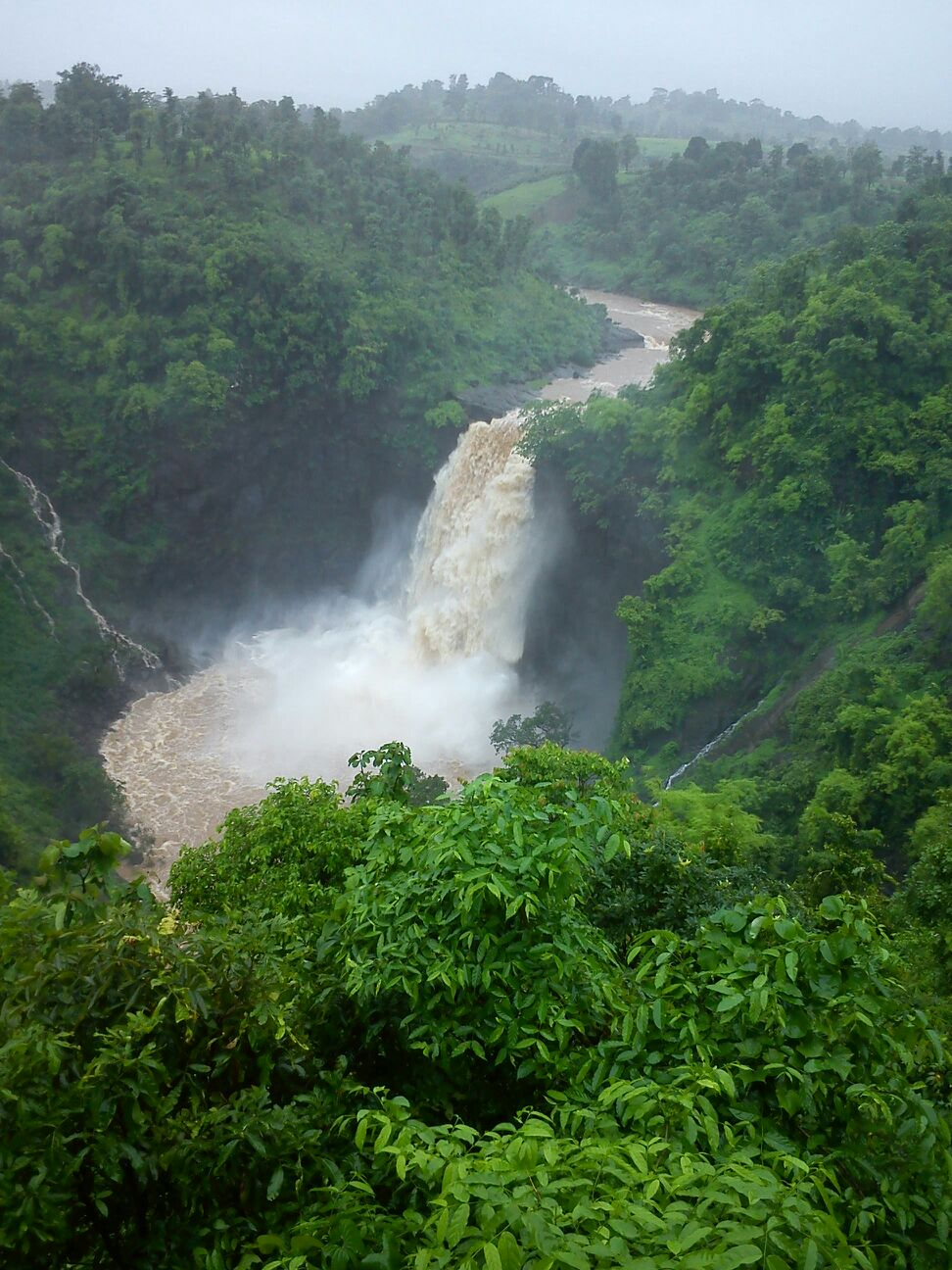
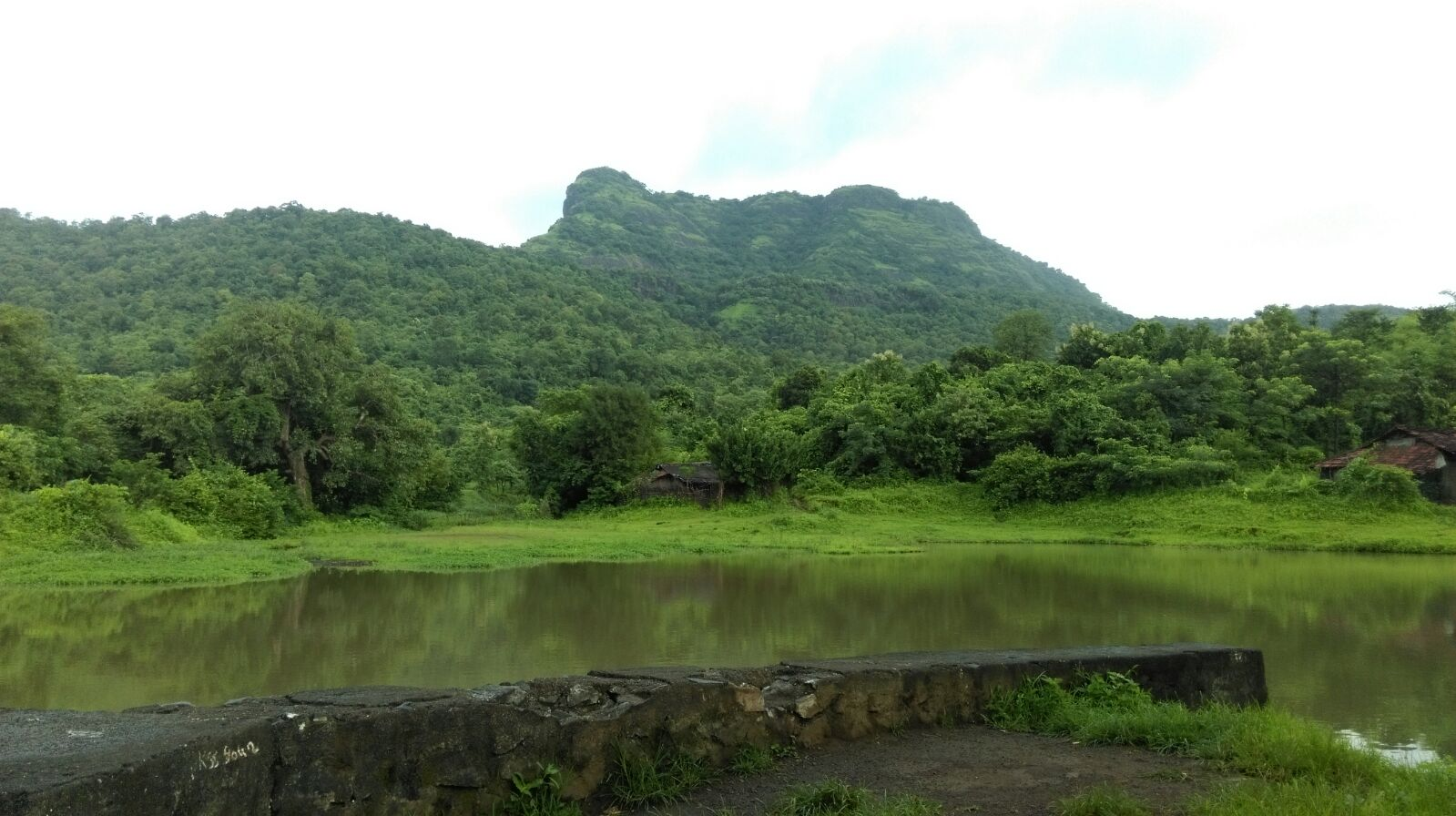
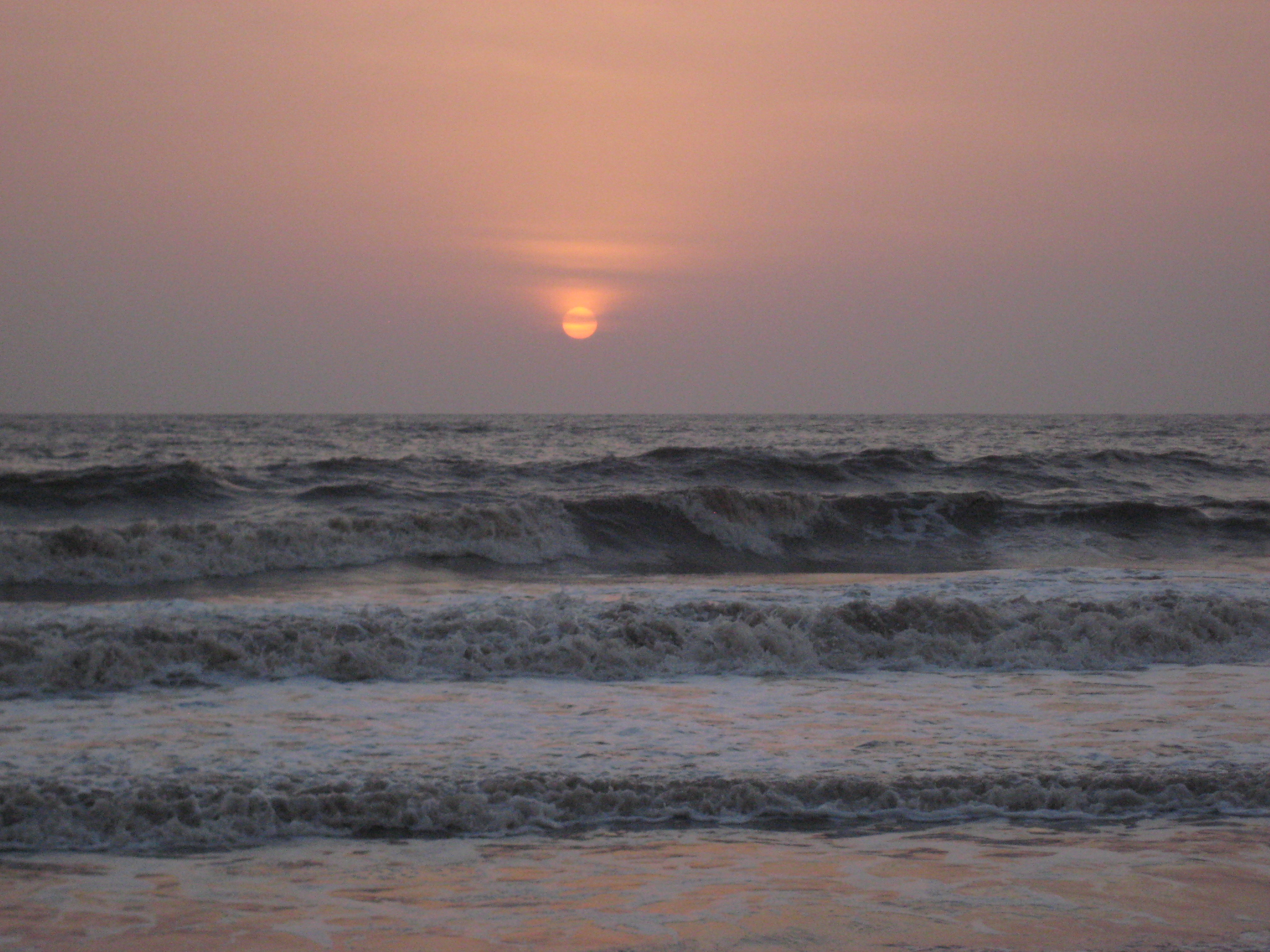
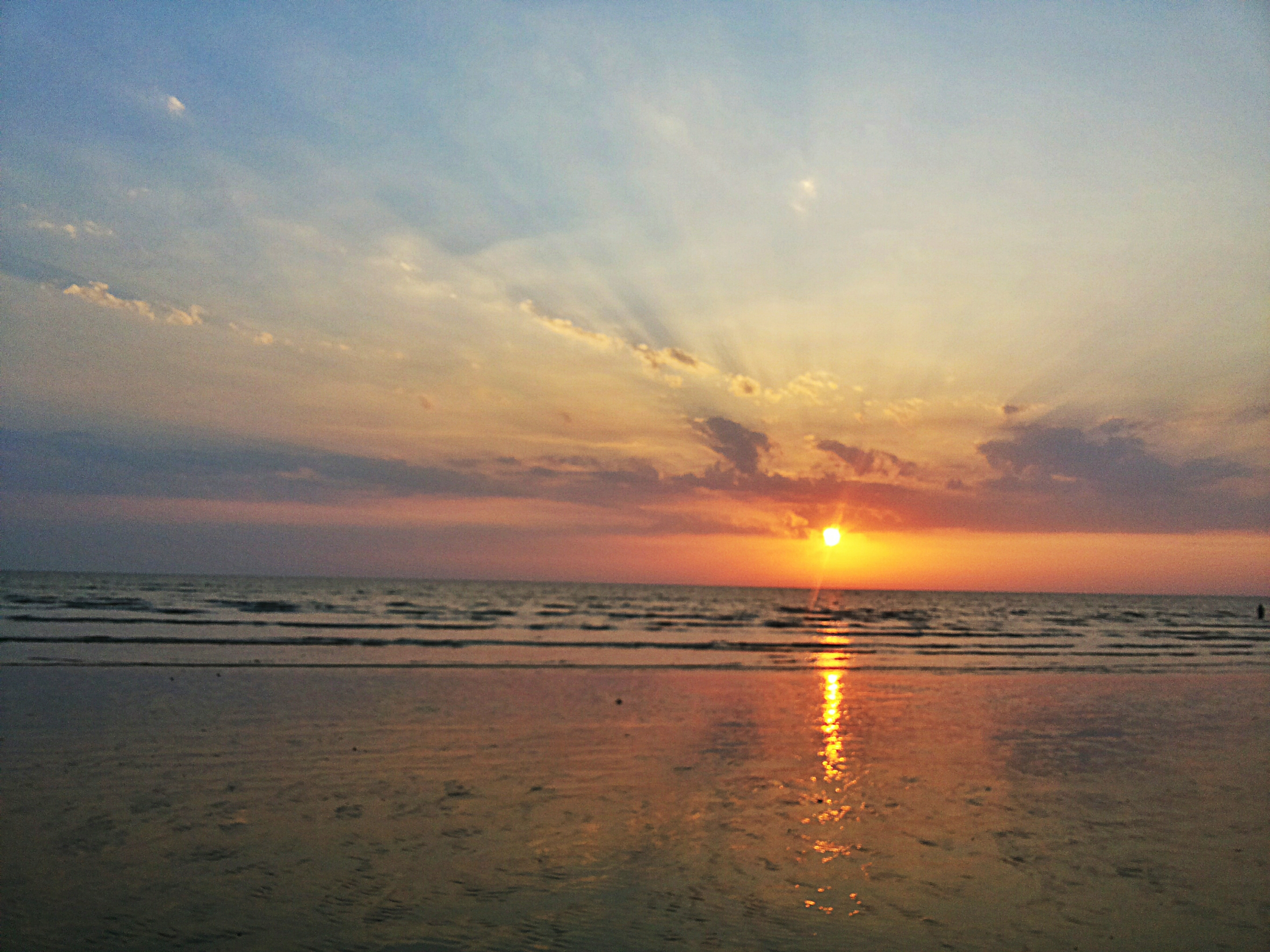
- Vajreshwari Temple, Dahbosa Waterfall, Tandulwadi Fort, Dahanu Beach, Kelwa Beach
- Palghar in Maharashtra
- Coordinates: 19.69°N 72.76°E
- Country: India
- State: Maharashtra
- District: Palghar

Government
  - Type: Municipal Council
  - Body: Palghar Municipal Council (PMC)
  - Member of Parliament: Hemant Savara, BJP
  - MLA: Shrinivas Vanga, (Shivsena)

Area
  - Total: 4,696.99 km^{2} (1,813.52 sq mi)
- Elevation: 7 m (23 ft)

Population (2011)
  - Total: 68,931
  - Density: 14.676/km^{2} (38.010/sq mi)

Languages
  - Official: Marathi
- Time zone: UTC+5:30 (IST)
- PIN: 401404
- Telephone code: 02525
- Vehicle registration: MH-48
- Website: https://palghar.gov.in/

Palghar is a prominent town in the Konkan division of Maharashtra state, India, and a municipal council. It is strategically located within the Mumbai Metropolitan Region, and has been the administrative capital of the Palghar district since 2014. Palghar plays a crucial role in Western Line of the Mumbai Suburban Railway in the busy Mumbai-Ahmedabad rail corridor. The town is located approximately 87 kilometers north of Mumbai, about 35 kilometers north of Virar, and about 24 kilometers west of the Mumbai-Ahmedabad National Highway at Manor. Palghar is located in western part of Maharastra.Mumbai is approximately 50 km from Palghar.

== History ==
Palghar has a history intertwined with the ancient district of Thane. The tehsils of Jawhar, Vasai, and Palghar are known for their rich historical legacy.

Palghar also played a crucial role in the Quit India Movement of 1942, where it was one of the important points in the Chale Jao Movement.

== Demographics ==
At the 2011 census of India, Palghar had a population of 68,930. Males numbered 36,523 (52.9%) and females 32,407 (47.1%). The literacy rate was 77.52%, higher than the national average of 59.5%; male literacy was 81.2% and female literacy 73.35%. 11.8% of the population was under 6 years of age.

Marathi is the most widely spoken language with Varli, Vadvali and Vanjari dialects. Followed by Gujarati spoken by a sizeable Gujarati and Muslim population.

Palghar has an urban population of 33,086, thus about 48% of the total population lives in the urbanized area.

Religion in Palghar (2011)
Religion	Percent
Hinduism	81.94%
Islam	11.07%
Jainism	2.86%
Buddhism	2.38%
Christianity	1.21%
Others	0.53%

== Culture ==
Various communities inhabit Palghar, with the predominant castes being the Kunbi, Mangela, Vaity, Macchimar, Bhandari, Warli (Adivasi), Katkari, Malhar Koli, Vanjari, Vadval, and Mali (Sorathi).

The Vanjaris are a nomadic tribe with origins in Chittorgarh, Rajasthan. Their language is distinct from standard Marathi, with significant influences from Rajasthani and Gujarati.

The Vadval community is the most numerous in Palghar. They are believed to be descendants of the Yadava dynasty of Devagiri, who settled in the region. The Vadvals are unique, as one of the few Marathi-speaking communities belonging to the Kshatriya varna but not part of the traditional 96-clan (96-Kuli) Maratha caste.

The Warli painting and the renowned Tarpa dance highlight the artistic contributions of the Warli community. Warli art has a history stretching back over a millennium and is celebrated internationally. The Warlis are considered some of the earliest settlers in the region, and their culture has significantly influenced the subsequent cultures in and around Palghar.

The Koli (fishermen) community of Palghar is a testament to the city's connection with the Arabian Sea. Fishing forms a significant part of Palghar's trade and diet and plays a crucial role in cultural events. The Kolis are further divided into subcastes such as Vaity, Mangela, and Bari.

=== Art, crafts and tourism ===
Tourist attractions in the district include:

- Arnala fort
- Bhavangad Fort
- Fort Vasai
- Gambhirgad
- Jivdani Mata temple
- Kaldurg Fort
- Kamandurg Fort
- Kelwa Beach
- Mahalakshmi Temple
- Shirgaon Fort
- Tandulwadi Fort
- Vajreshwari hot water spring

== Economy ==
The economy of Palghar is primarily driven by the primary and tertiary sectors. As the administrative seat of the Taluka and District, Palghar hosts numerous government offices, providing employment opportunities to many residents.

Agriculture, Animal husbandry, dairy farming, and fisheries are extensively practiced in the rural areas surrounding the city, playing a significant role in fueling the local economy. The region is known for its production of rice, fruits, and dairy products.

Historically, Palghar was notorious for wood smuggling in the post-independence era. This illicit activity has been largely curbed due to stringent measures by the Forest Department and local police. Additionally, the region's secluded beaches were once favored by smugglers who used them to offload goods and transport them to Mumbai by road to evade customs.

== Future development ==
The Maharashtra government envisions the Palghar district as the "Fourth Mumbai" (Mumbai 4.0) to expand the Mumbai Metropolitan Region (MMR) and boost the regional economy. A primary driver of this growth is the upcoming Vadhavan Port, a greenfield deep-water port near Dahanu. Developed jointly by the Jawaharlal Nehru Port Authority and the Maharashtra Maritime Board, the port is designed to handle the world's largest cargo ships and is estimated to generate over one million jobs.

The region will also be connected to the Mumbai–Ahmedabad high-speed rail corridor (bullet train), with dedicated stations planned at Boisar and Vasai-Virar, which is projected to significantly reduce travel time to Mumbai's Bandra Kurla Complex (BKC).

To accommodate the resulting industrial and demographic expansion, state agencies are planning two major townships in the district, including a 514 sq km development in the Dahanu taluka and another near the Boisar bullet train station. This state-led infrastructure push has spurred large-scale residential and commercial real estate projects in the area, such as the Veena Samrajya township in Palghar West, designed to accommodate the incoming logistics workforce.

== Transport ==
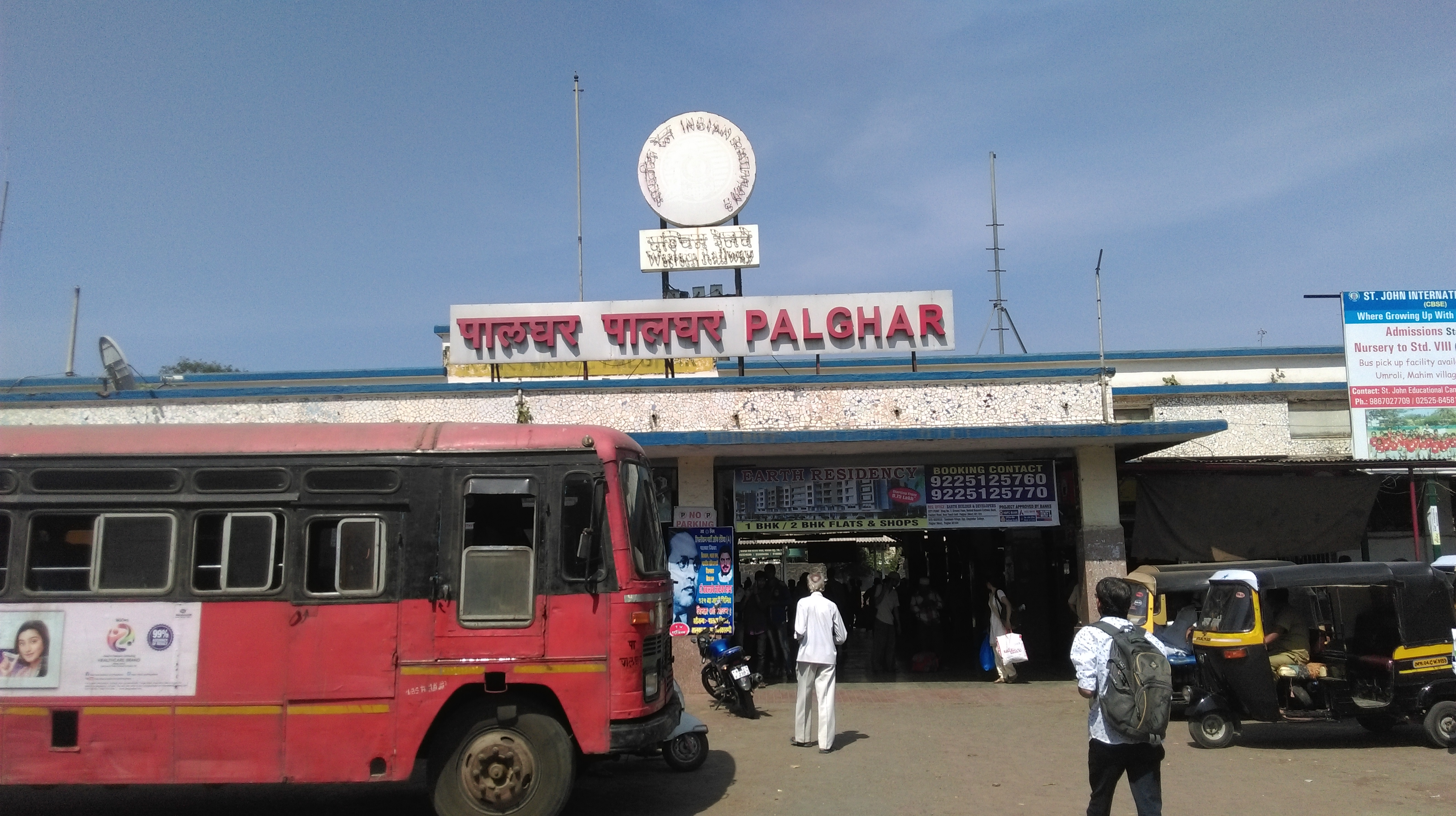
Palghar railway station

Palghar is well connected via road and rail transport. The town serves as a divisional head of the Maharashtra State Road Transport Corporation (MSRTC), providing direct connectivity to several towns across Maharashtra and Gujarat, including Surat, Navsari, Vapi, Valsad, Vadodara, Bharuch, Ankleshwar, Anand, Nadiad, Mumbai, Ahmedabad, Miraj, Sangli, Pune, Vaduj, Thane, Ulhasnagar, Bhiwandi, Aurangabad, Ahmednagar, Kalyan, Alibag, Nandurbar, Bhusaval, Shirdi, and Nashik.

The Palghar railway station is a significant stop on the Western Line of the Mumbai Suburban Railway and the Ahmedabad–Mumbai main line. In addition to Shuttle/MEMU/EMU (local trains) services, many long-distance trains also halt at this station.

== Sports ==
Cricket is the most popular sport in Palghar. Local tournaments are held at various locations in the district.

- Shardul Thakur is a cricketer from Palghar (Mahim) who plays for India, for Lucknow Super Giants in the IPL and for Mumbai in the Ranji Trophy.
- Aditya Tare is a wicket-keeper and a right-hand batsman from Palghar (Satpati village) who plays for Mumbai Indians in the IPL and for Mumbai in the Ranji Trophy.
- Ayush Mhatre is Right-Hand Top Order Batsman from Palghar (Virar) who plays for Chennai Super Kings in the IPL and for Mumbai in the Domestic Circuit of India.

== See also ==
- 2020 Palghar mob lynching
