= Dativare fort =

Dativare Fort
- Part of Malabar sea coast
- Palghar district, Maharashtra

Site information
- Type: Sea fort
- Owner: India, Government of India
- Controlled by: Portugal (1548-1699) United Kingdom: East India Company (1755-1857); British Raj (1857-1947); India (1947-)
- Open to the public: Yes
- Condition: Ruins

Location
- Shown within Maharashtra
- Coordinates: 19°30′51″N 72°46′20″E
- Height: 300 Ft.

Site history
- Materials: Stone

Dativare Fort / Hira Dongar is a fort located 72 km from Vasai, in Palghar district, of Maharashtra, India. The fort is located at a commanding point upon a small hillock beside the Vaitarna River, which runs until Arnala Fort.

== History ==
Very little is known of the fort's history, other than that it was probably built by Portuguese.

== How to reach ==
The nearest town is Saphale which is 107 km (66 mi) from Mumbai by rail. The base village of the fort is Datiware or Dantiware, which is 15–20 km (9.3–12.4 mi) from Saphale by road. There are good hotels at Saphale and Edwan. Now tea and snacks are also available in small hotels along the coastal road. The trekking path starts from the hillock north of the Dativare village. Now there is a very safe and wide road up to the fort. It takes about half an hour to reach the entrance gate of the fort.

== Places to see ==
There are few walls and ruined bastions of the fort left to visit.

== See also ==
- List of forts in Maharashtra
- List of forts in India
- Marathi People
- Portuguese India
- Maratha Navy
- List of Maratha dynasties and states
- Battles involving the Maratha Empire
