= Tansa Wildlife Sanctuary =

Wildlife sanctuary in India

- IUCN category IV (habitat/species management area)
- Location within Maharashtra Location within India
- Interactive map of Tansa Wildlife Sanctuary
- Location: Palghar district, Maharashtra, India
- Nearest city: Thane and Shahpur
- Coordinates: 19°32′42″N 73°15′54″E
- Area: 320 km^{2} (120 sq mi)
- Established: 12 February 1970
- Governing body: Maharashtra State Forest Department

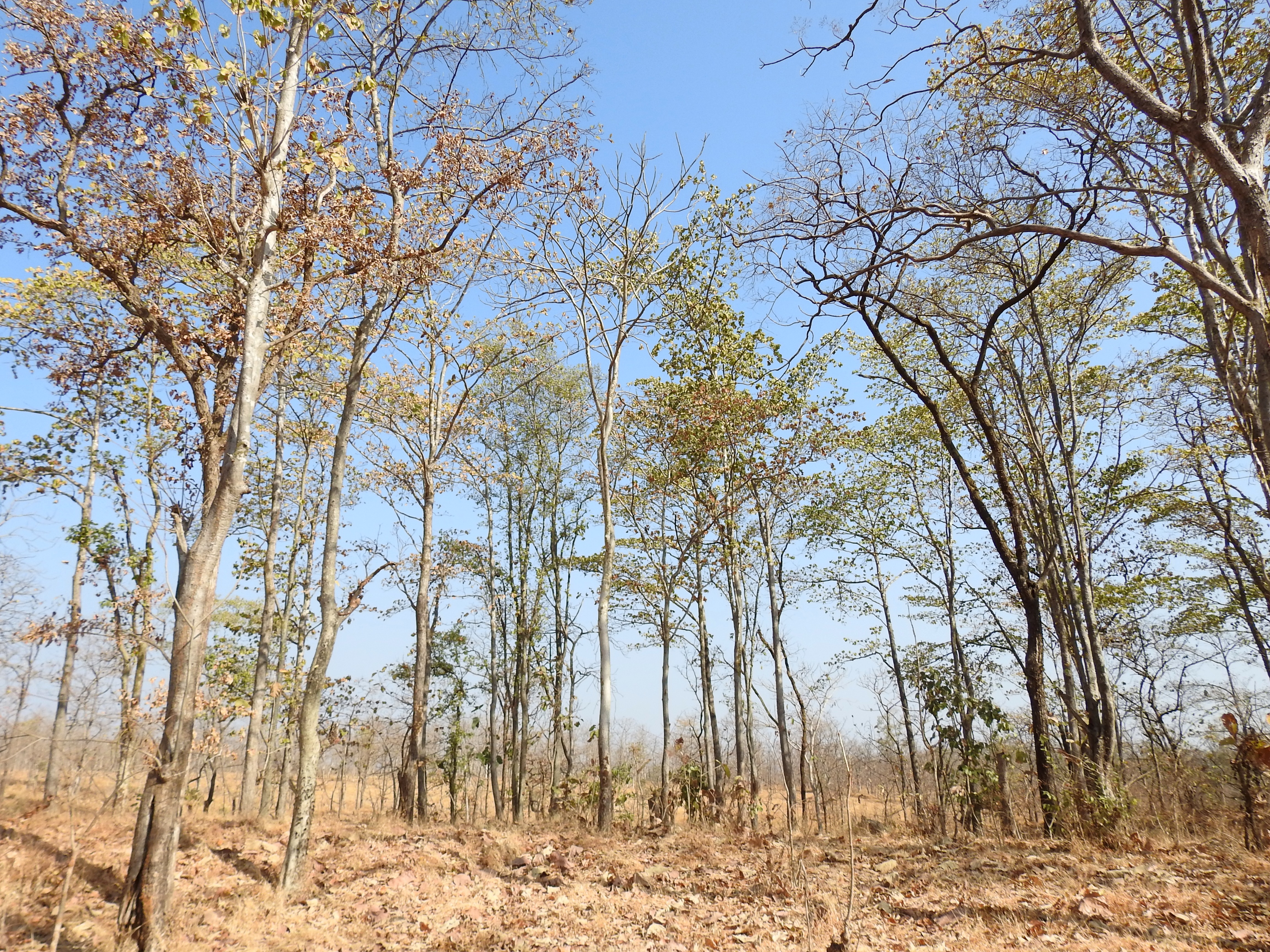
Dry Deciduous Forest, Tansa Wildlife Sanctuary

The Tansa Wildlife Sanctuary is located in Shahapur and Bhiwandi taluka of Thane district and Wada taluka of Palghar district. The sanctuary is spread over an area of 320 km^{2}. This sanctuary is spread around the catchment area of Tansa, Vaitarna and Modak Sagar lakes which are major source of water to the Mumbai, Thane and Bhiwandi cities. There are about 60 villages in the sanctuary area. The forest area is hilly with dense patches of forest.

== Location ==
The nearest rail head is Shahapur Town of Maharashtra state which is 15 km from the sanctuary. Regular buses at an interval of 30 minutes are available from Shahapur and Bhiwandi Bus Stand. The sanctuary is open for visitors from sunrise to sunset. There are many hotels and resorts located near Shahapur town.

== Management ==
The Tansa sanctuary is a part of Thane Wildlife Division.The Tansa sanctuary is managed by four forest Ranges Tansa, Khardi (Shahapur) and Vaitarna, Parali (Wada-Mokhada). The Wada-Shahapur Road and Wada-Nashik Road passes through the sanctuary. There are four forest check post on these roads.

== Flora ==
The forest type is Southern moist deciduous forest. Common trees include Tectona grandis, Terminalia belerica, Senegalia catechu, Terminalia elliptica, Haldina cordifolia, Mitragyna parvifolia, and Pterocarpus marsupium.

== Fauna ==
There are 54 species of mammals and more than 250 species of birds found in the sanctuary. Mammals include leopard, sloth bear, porcupine, and barking deer. Birds include various species of Owls, forest birds and the endangered forest owlet.

== Tourist sites ==
The major tourist place is Tansa Dam. The other tourist places are Mahuli Fort, Mahadeo Temple at Tilsa and Suryamal plateau.

== Threats ==
The forest is under continuous threat from timber mafias who are exploiting the forest for valuable teak, Khair and Shisham trees. The other threats include forest fires, encroachment, hunting and trespassing.
