= Kelwa =

Kelwa Kelve
- town
- Location in Maharashtra, India
- Coordinates: 19.614858°N 72.736101°E
- Country: India
- State: Maharashtra

Languages
  - Official: Marathi
- Time zone: UTC+5:30 (IST)

Kelwa or Kelve is a town in Maharashtra, India. It is served by the Kelve Road railway station on the Western line of the Mumbai Suburban Railway which extends from Churchgate to Dahanu Road.

== Location ==
Kelwe is located 35 km North of Virar on the Western Railway line of Mumbai Suburban Railway.

The famous Kelwa Beach which is situated around 5 kilometres from the Kelve Road station.

Palghar town is situated 12 kilometres away to the north while Saphale lies to its south.

Jai Ambe Maa Temple In Kelve Road Station Ambaji Mata Temple Is A Major Shakti Peeth Of Kelve Road It Was Established For 11 November 2008

== Industrial area and power stations ==
Tarapur Industrial Estate, Tarapur Atomic Power Station and a Thermal Power Station owned by Reliance Energy Limited are located around 30 kilometres from Kelwe.
