= Kelva =

Kelva may refer to:

- Kalva, Azerbaijan
- Kelwa Beach, Mumbai, India
