= Water sources of Mumbai =

Water supply to Mumbai, India

Mumbai controls several dams in Shahapur Taluka (Thane district) that deliver water to the city. The Western Ghats trap most of the moisture-laden monsoon clouds, which feed these dammed rivers. Currently, these dams/lakes deliver approximately 3.4 billion litres of water to Mumbai daily.

Dams and Lakes near Mumbai
Dam	Year	Capacity (Million Litres)	Overflow Level (Metres)
Vihar Dam	1860 & 1872	25,698	80.42
Tulsi Dam	1872	8,046	139.17
Tansa Lake	1892 (Stage-I), 1915 (Stage-II), 1925 (Stage-III), 1948 (Stage-IV)	145,080	128.63
Modak Sagar (Lower Vaitarna Dam)	1954 & 1957	128,925	163.15
Upper Vaitarna Dam	1972	227,047	603.51
Bhatsa Dam	1980 to 2007	717,037	142.07
Middle Vaitarna Dam	2014	193,530	285.00

Tansa and Vaitarna dams supply the Southern region of Mumbai, while the rest supply the suburbs. An underground tank in Malabar Hill is used to store the water.
