= Tansa =

Tansa can refer to:

== Places ==
- Tansa River near Mumbai, India
- Tansa Dam on Tansa River near Mumbai, India
- Tansa, Iași, a commune in Romania
- Tansa, a village in Belcești Commune, Iaşi County, Romania

== Organisations ==
- TansaX, JAXA's Space Exploration Innovation Hub (investigation, exploration (探査, tansa))
