= Sartodi =

Village in Maharashtra

- village
- Interactive map of Sartodi
- Country: India
- State: Maharashtra
- District: Palghar

Population (2010)
  - Total: 500 plus

Languages
  - Official: Marathi
- Time zone: UTC+5:30 (IST)
- PIN: 401 102
- Telephone code: 02525
- Vehicle registration: MH-
- Nearest city: Saphale

Sartodi is a small village in Maharashtra, located in Palghar district in Palghar taluka.
