= Aagarwadi =

Village in Maharashtra

Coordinates: 19°35′07″N 72°46′06″E

Agarwadi (Aagarwadi) is a small village in Maharashtra, India, having a population around 3600. The village is located at a distance of 6 km (3.7 mi) from Saphale Railway station, west side. The village is a native of Aagri (a sub language of Marathi) speaking people. They belong to Das-Agari and Khar-Patil communities. Makunsar, Tighare and Rambaug are the villages sharing its boundaries to the North and South side of Aagarwadi. Kevla Beach is a very popular tourist attraction which is situated 3 km from Agarwadi.

The villagers are mainly in the field of farming and artistic pursuits such as drama and acting. Past two generations have brought into Government and Public sectors jobs also. New generation is well qualified for jobs in the IT industry.

The Village accommodates nearly 50-year-old Secondary high school and a 100-year-old Ram-Temple. People here are engaged in political and spiritual matters.

The village has hospitals, Government offices, medical supply stores, retail banks and Patapedi. It has multiple schools, Loknayak Jayprakash Narayan Vidyalay which is a school for students from 5th grade to 10th grade and it has a college attached to which is named Shardha Bhavan Kanista Mahavidyala Arts and Commerce.
