= Vaitarna railway station =

Railway Station in Maharashtra, India

Vaitarna

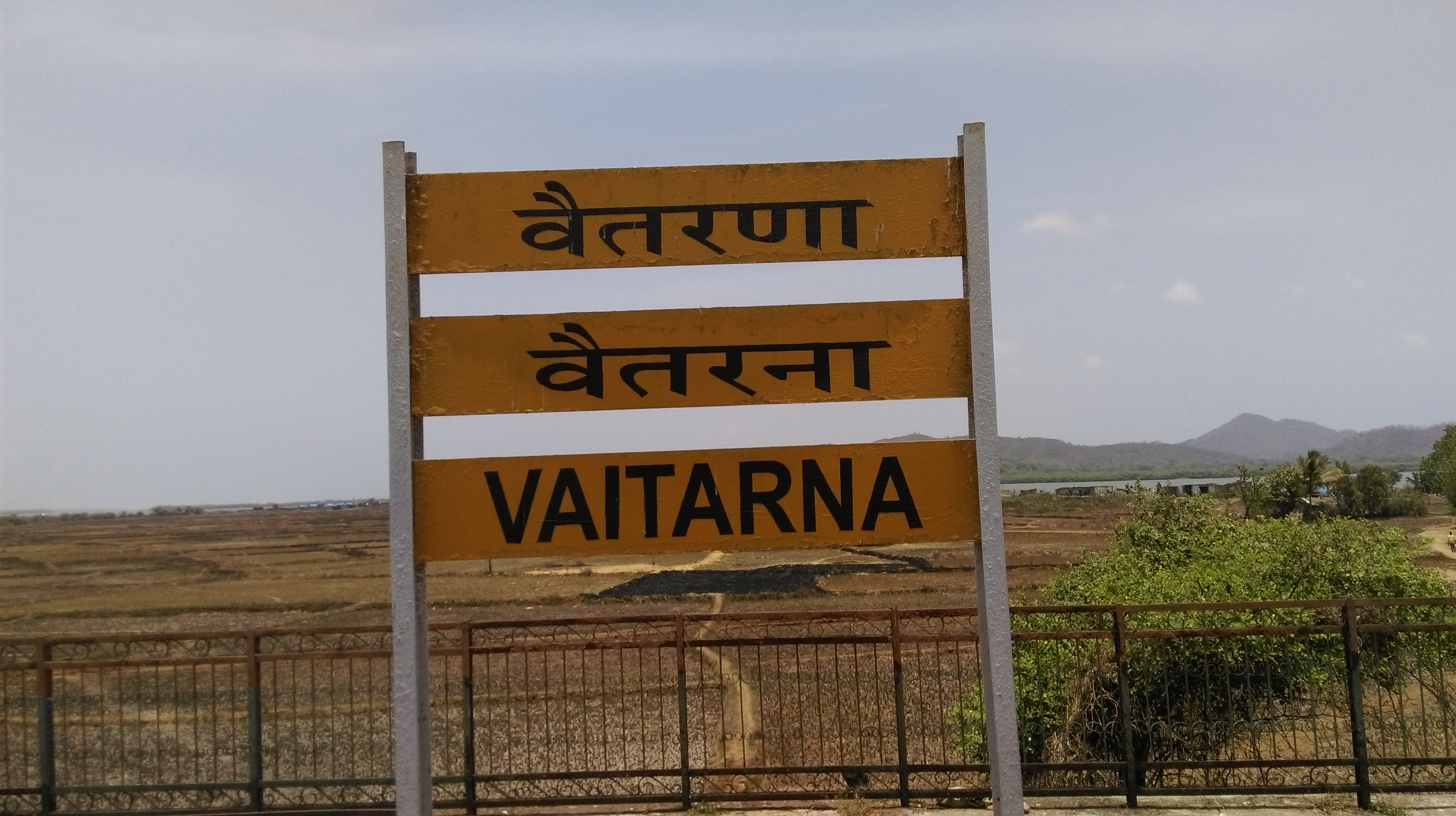

General information
- Location: Vaitarna
- Coordinates: 19.518654°N 72.850008°E
- System: Mumbai Suburban Railway station
- Owner: Ministry of Railways, Indian Railways
- Line: Western Line

Construction
- Structure type: Standard on-ground station

Other information
- Status: Active
- Station code: VTN
- Fare zone: Western Railways

Services
Preceding station	Mumbai Suburban Railway	Following station
Virar towards Churchgate	Western line	Saphale towards Dahanu Road
Route map
Location
- Location within Maharashtra

Vaitarna is a railway station at Vaitarna on the Western line of the Mumbai Suburban Railway network. The station is named after the Vaitarna river.
