= Jhow Island =

Island in Maharashtra, India

- Interactive map of Jhow Island

Geography
- Location: Arabian Sea
- Coordinates: 19°29′56″N 72°49′00″E
- Area: 1.23002 km^{2} (0.47491 sq mi)
- Coastline: 6.10 km (3.79 mi)
- Highest elevation: 1 m (3 ft)

Administration
- India
- State: Maharashtra
- India

Jhow Island is a continental island located at the mouth of Vasai Creek of the Vaitarna River in the Arabian Sea, near the Palghar district in Maharashtra, India. It has villages such as Chikhaldongri and Naringi.

== Geography ==
It spans an area of approximately 1.23 square kilometers with an elevation of about 1 meter. The island's margins are covered with mangroves, while the interior is used for cultivation. The flora includes mangrove species and associated plants, while the fauna comprises crustaceans, marine invertebrates, fish, and seabirds.

The primary economic activities on Jhow Island include agriculture and fishing. The shortest distance from the mainland is 2 km from Khardi and 3 km from Vihar villages. The nearest airport is Chhatrapati Shivaji International Airport in Mumbai, 55 km away.

== Climate ==
The climate of Jhow Island is classified as tropical wet and dry ('Aw') according to the Köppen-Geiger system. The average annual temperature is 26.5 °C, with May being the warmest month (29.8 °C) and January the coldest (22.6 °C). The island receives an annual precipitation of 2101 mm, with the highest rainfall occurring in July (831 mm).

== Sand mining ==
In 2018, a public interest litigation (PIL) was filed by Julie Kharbhumi Labharthi Shetkari Sahkari Sanstha, addressing concerns about illegal sand mining in the Vaitarna River, which posed a threat to the livelihoods of approximately 100 farmer families on Jhow Island. Responding to the case, the Bombay High Court instructed the Indian Railways to install iron girders under two railway bridges and set up CCTV cameras powered by solar panels to monitor and curb illegal sand mining activities. The court also directed the Government of Maharashtra to formulate a policy within one month to ensure that illegally excavated sand is returned to its original location to mitigate ecological damage.
