= Nimbavali =

Village in Maharashtra

- village
- Location in Maharashtra, India Nimbavali (India)
- Coordinates: 19.5086385°N 73.0132236°E
- Country: India
- State: Maharashtra
- District: Palghar
- Taluka: Wada
- Elevation: 16 m (52 ft)

Population (2011)
  - Total: 970
- Time zone: UTC+5:30 (IST)
- 2011 census code: 552641

Nimbavali is a village in the Palghar district of Maharashtra, India. It is located in the wada taluka. It lies on the bank of Tanasa River.

The name of village Nimbavali may be due to a big Tree of Neem standing at entrance of the village.

A famous destination for hot springs and a Nityanand swami mandir in the village Ganeshpuri is 1 km away from Nimbavali. These two villages are separated by the river Tansa and connected by a bridge.

There are two or three hot springs named Anasuya kund on land, while two or three springs are inside the river. There are two old temples of Shiva and Bajarangbali.

The village is made up mostly of Adivasi people.

== Demographics ==
According to the 2011 census of India, Nimbavali has 168 households. The effective literacy rate (i.e. excluding children aged 6 and below) is 87.07%.

Demographics (2011 Census)
	Total	Male	Female
Population	970	513	457
Children aged below 6 years	88	49	39
Scheduled caste	0	0	0
Scheduled tribe	0	0	0
Literates	768	428	340
Workers (all)	355	268	87
Main workers (total)	273	242	31
Main workers: Cultivators	116	98	18
Main workers: Agricultural labourers	11	8	3
Main workers: Household industry workers	18	18	0
Main workers: Other	128	118	10
Marginal workers (total)	82	26	56
Marginal workers: Cultivators	46	5	41
Marginal workers: Agricultural labourers	2	1	1
Marginal workers: Household industry workers	2	0	2
Marginal workers: Others	32	20	12
Non-workers	615	245	370
