= Saphale railway station =

Railway Station in Maharashtra, India

Saphale

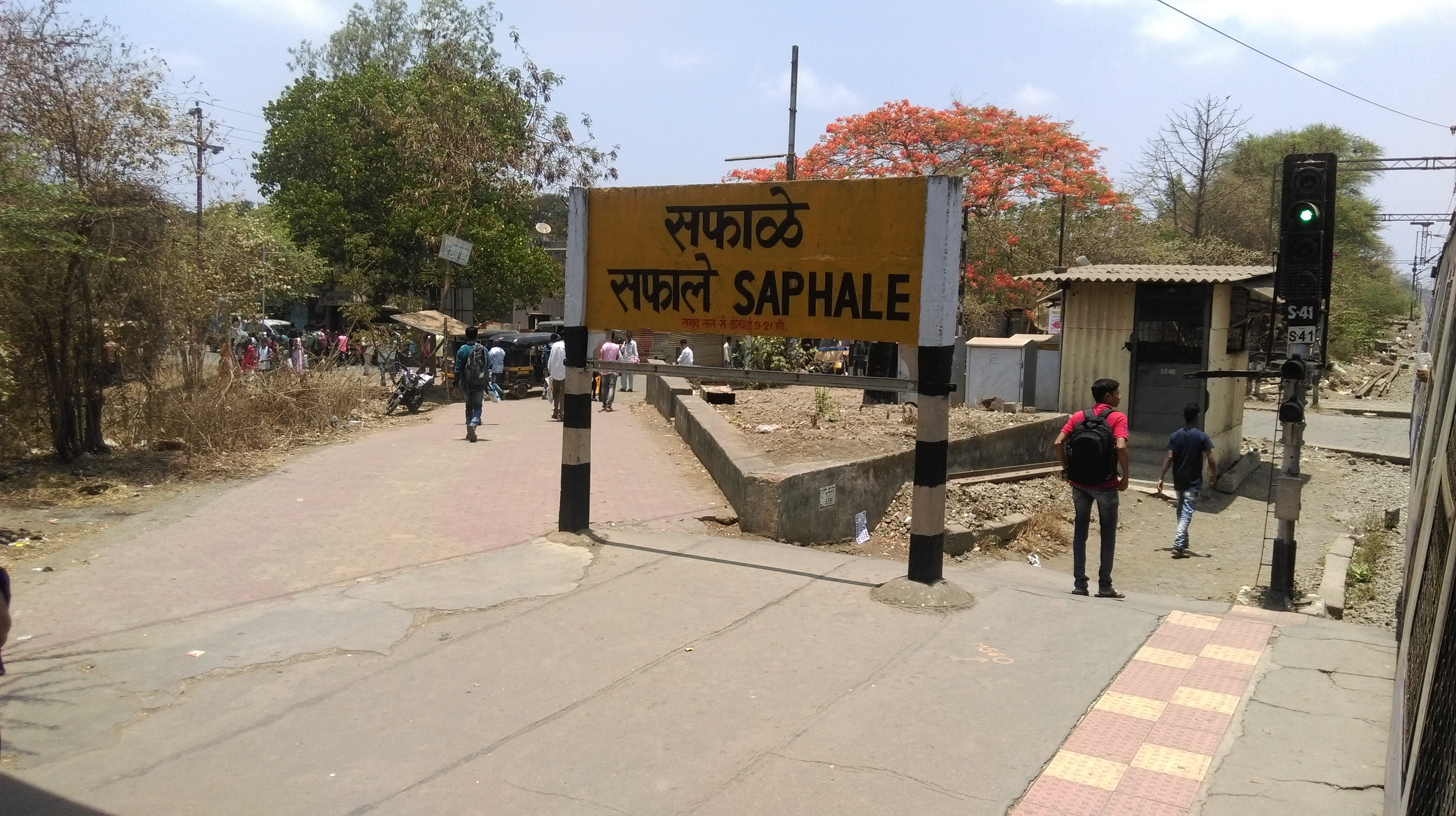

General information
- Location: Saphale
- Coordinates: 19.577778°N 72.819167°E
- Elevation: 9.210 metres (30.22 ft)
- System: Mumbai Suburban Railway station
- Owner: Ministry of Railways, Indian Railways
- Line: Western Line
- Platforms: 2

Construction
- Structure type: Standard on-ground station

Other information
- Status: Active
- Station code: SAH
- Fare zone: Western Railways

Services
Preceding station	Mumbai Suburban Railway	Following station
Vaitarna towards Churchgate	Western line	Kelve Road towards Dahanu Road
Route map
Location
- Location within Maharashtra

Saphale railway station is a railway station at Saphale on the Western Line of the Mumbai Suburban Railway network.

== Platforms ==
The station has two platforms. The West side platform is generally used by Down Trains, and the East side one by Up trains. The platforms are accessible through a foot over bridge ramp on the east side (or from a staffed railway crossing at the north of the main platforms).

== Trains ==
The following trains halt at Saphale railway station in both directions:

- 19215/16 Mumbai Central - Porbandar Saurashtra Express

== Gallery ==
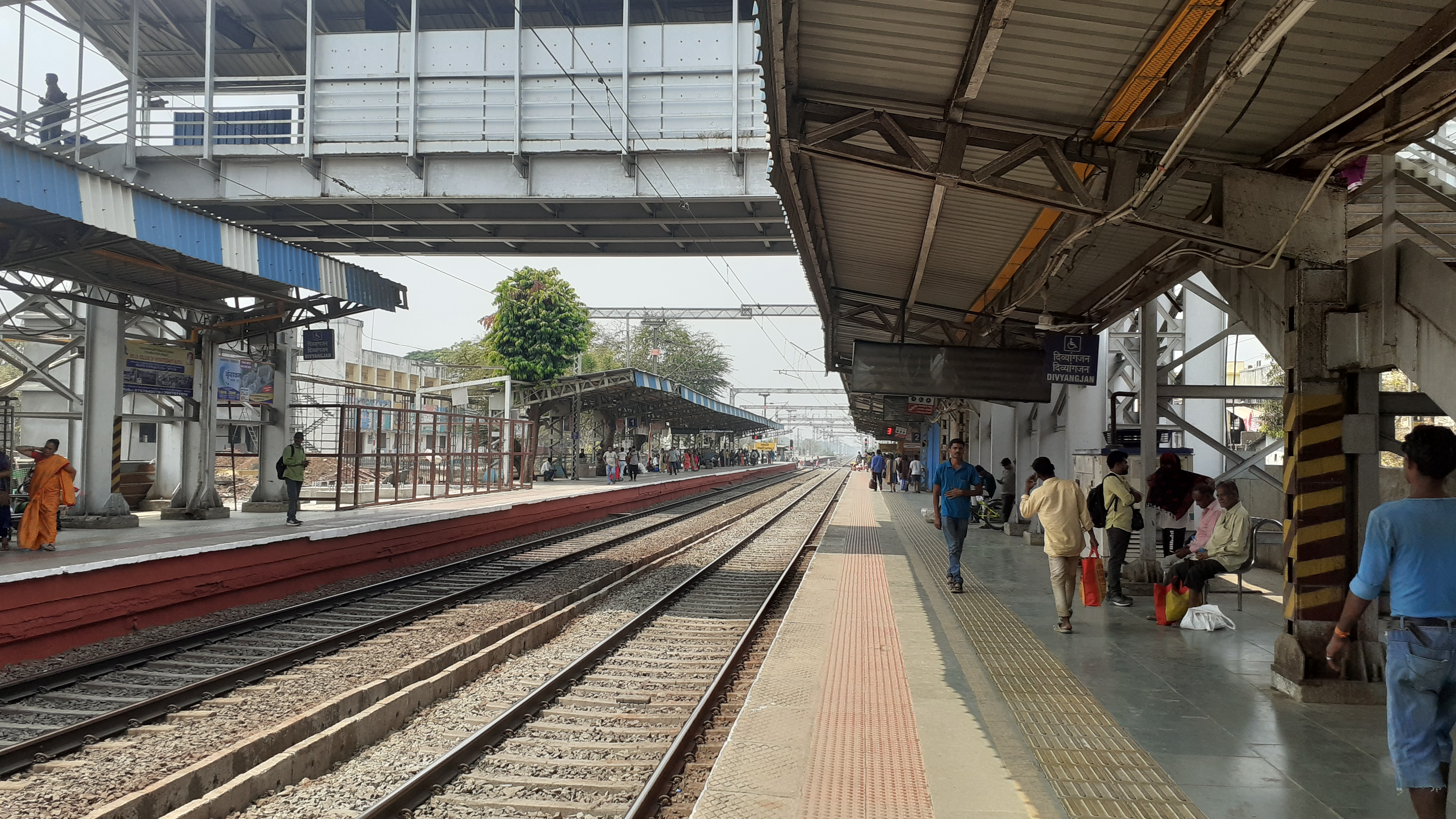
Northward view from Platform

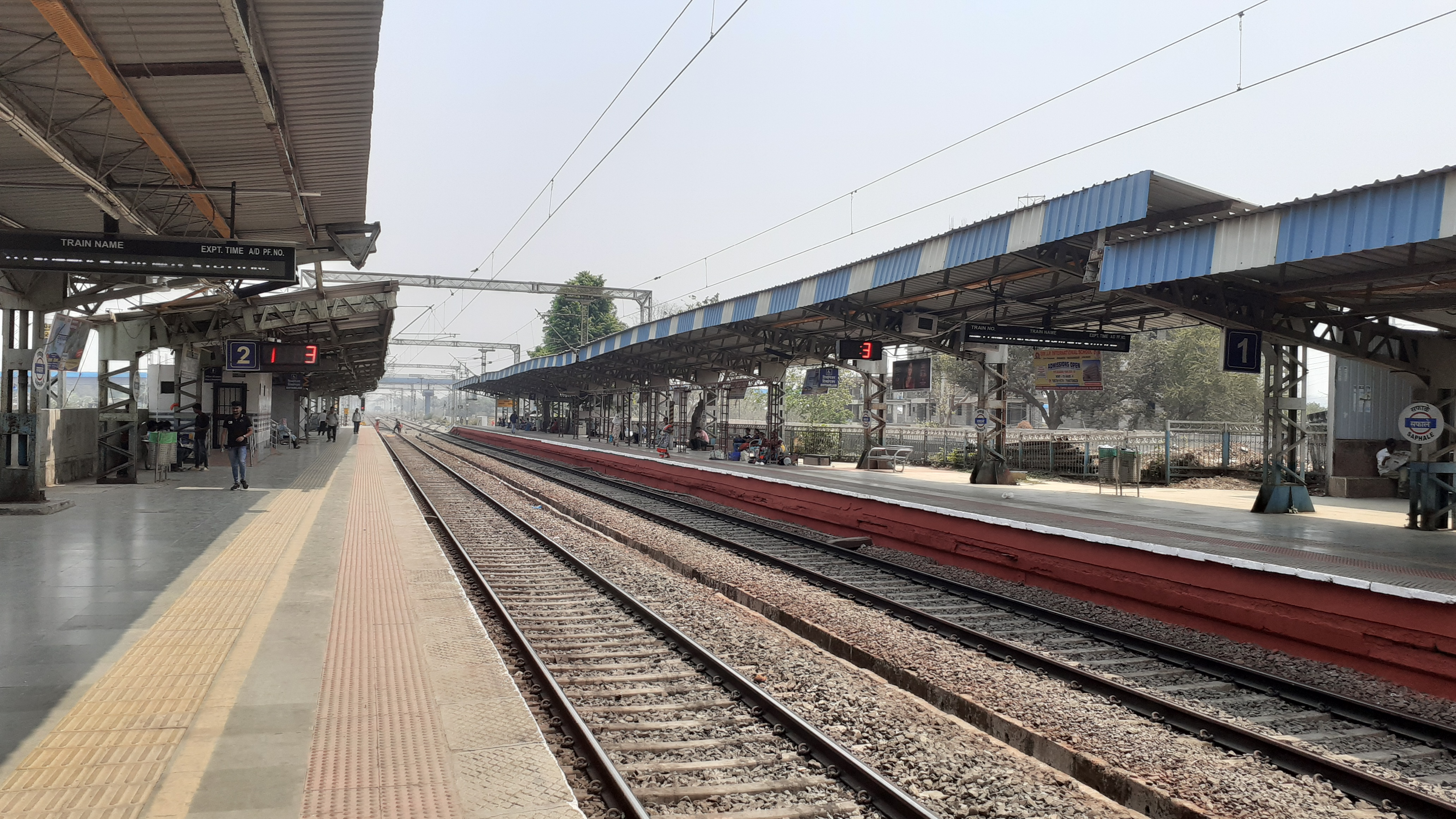
Southward view from Platform

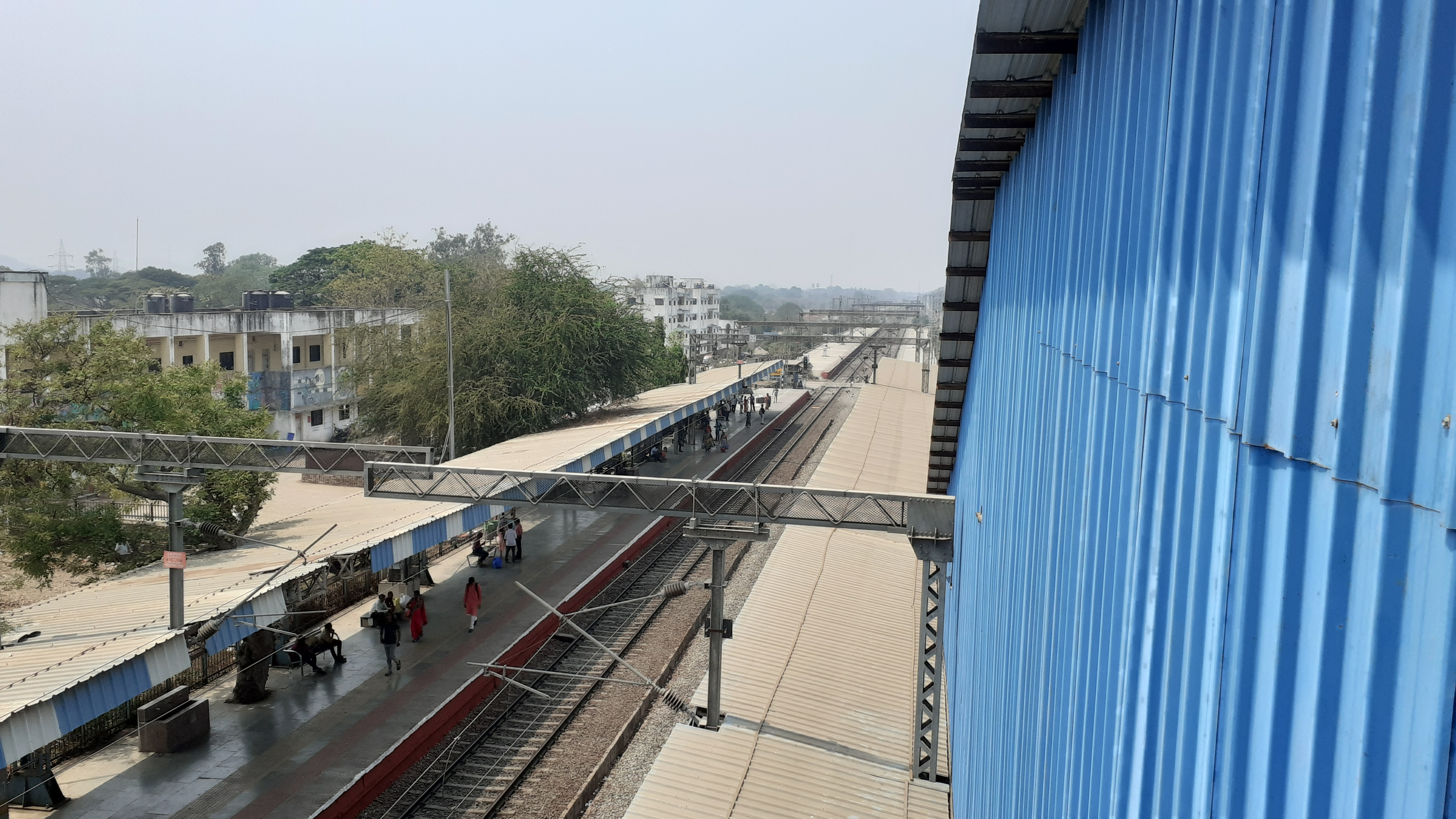
Northward view from FoB

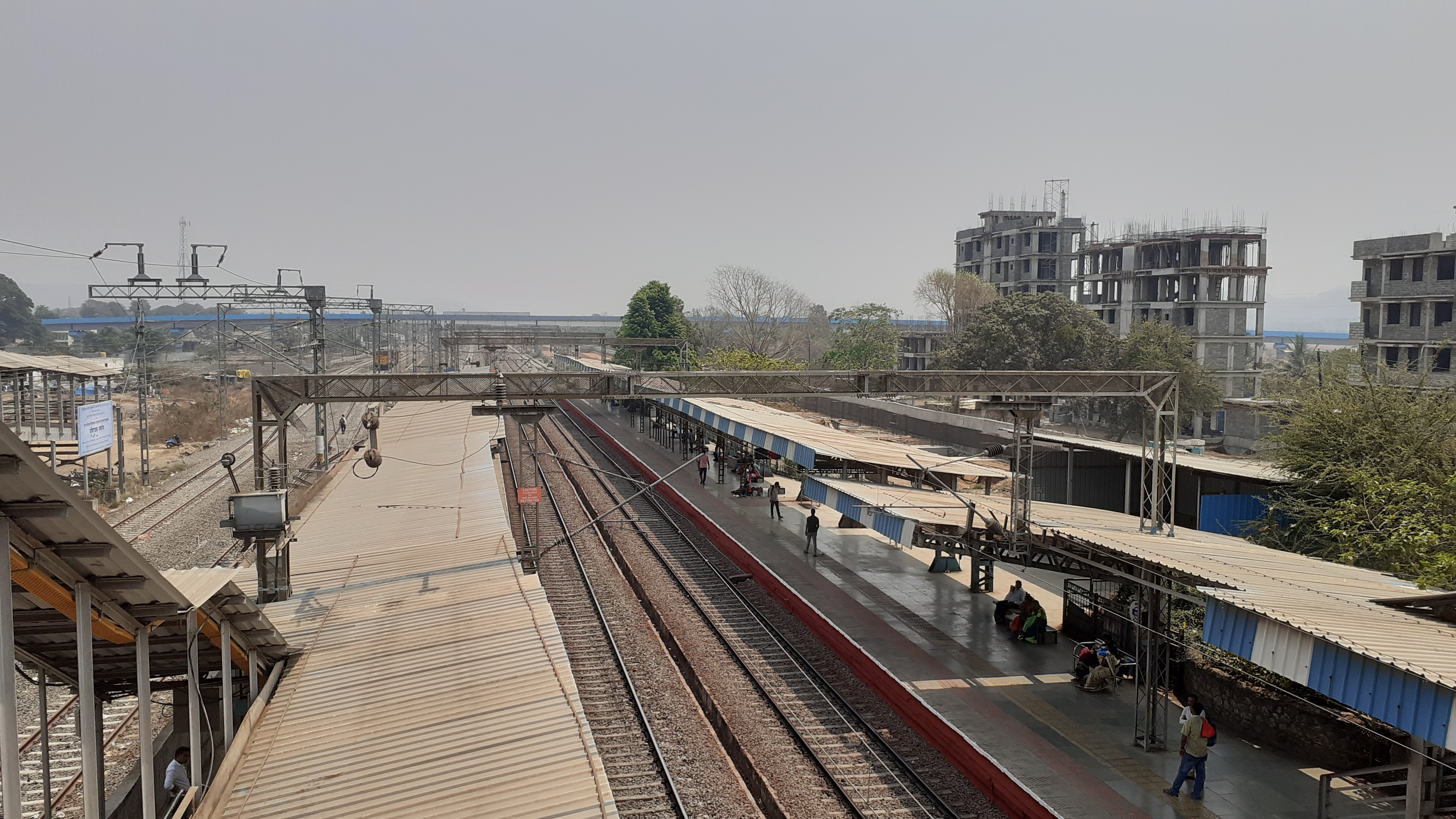
Southward view from FoB

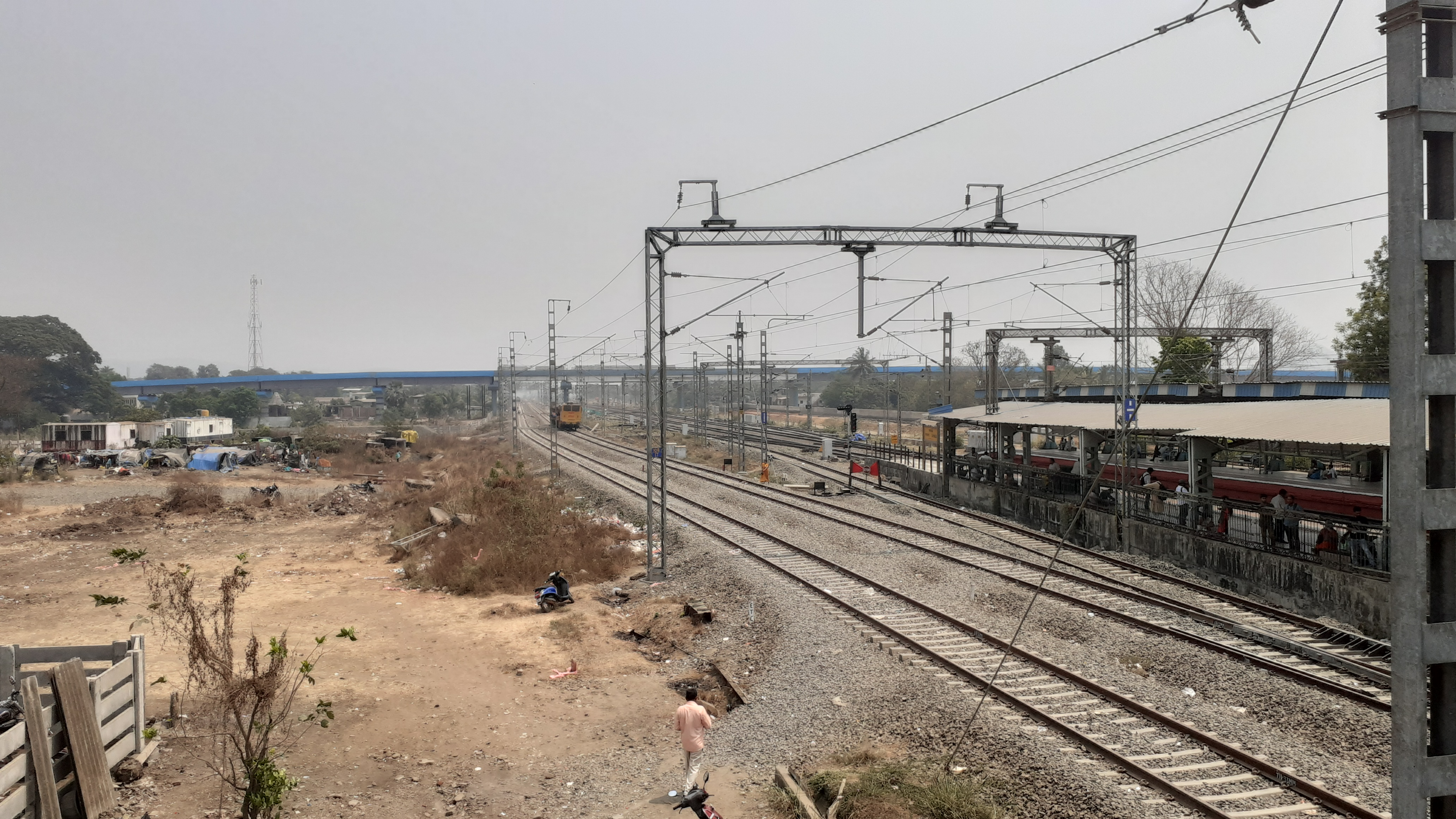
South looking view of tracks entering Saphale station. WDFC lines in foreground

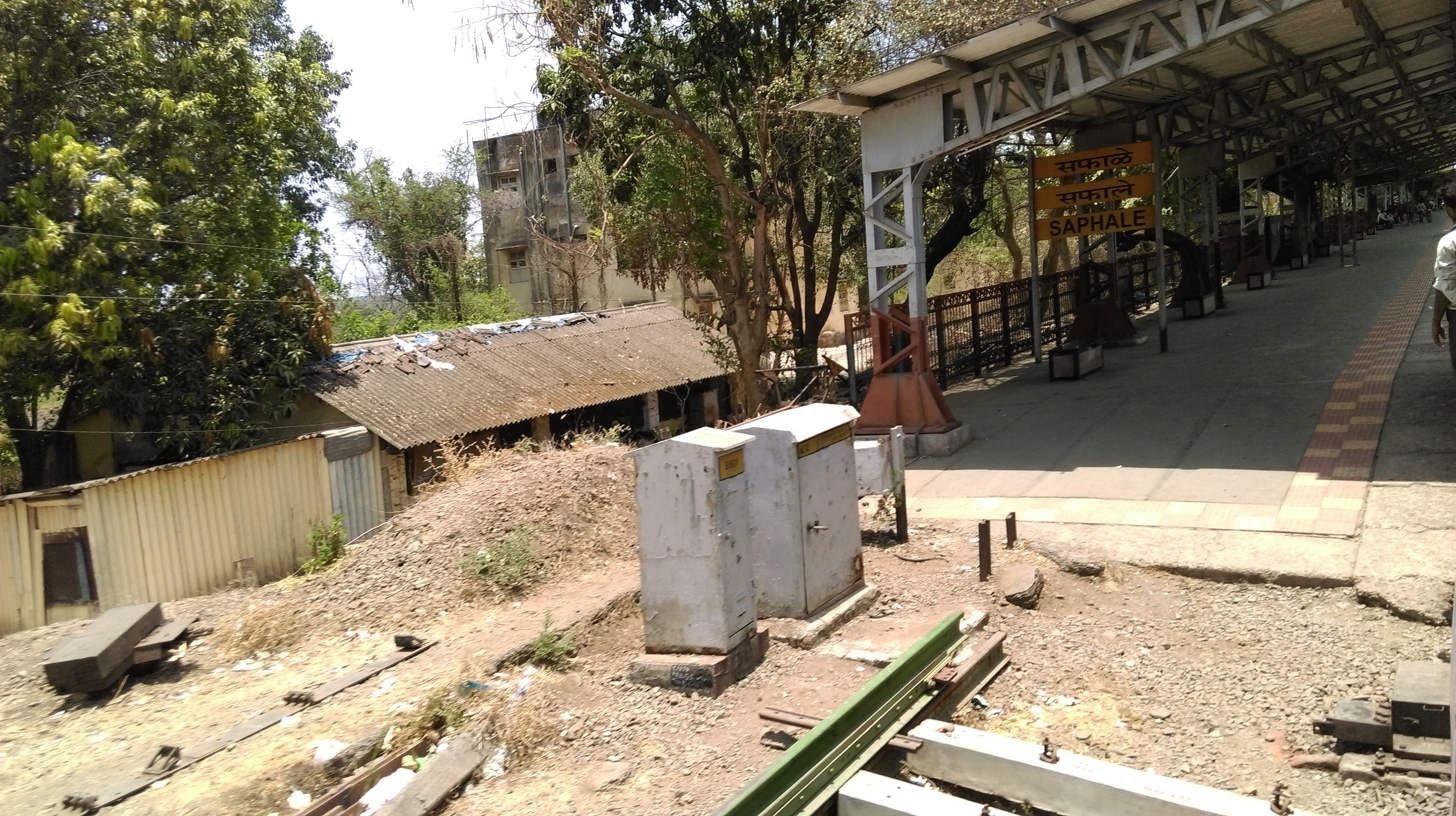
Saphale railway station - Station board

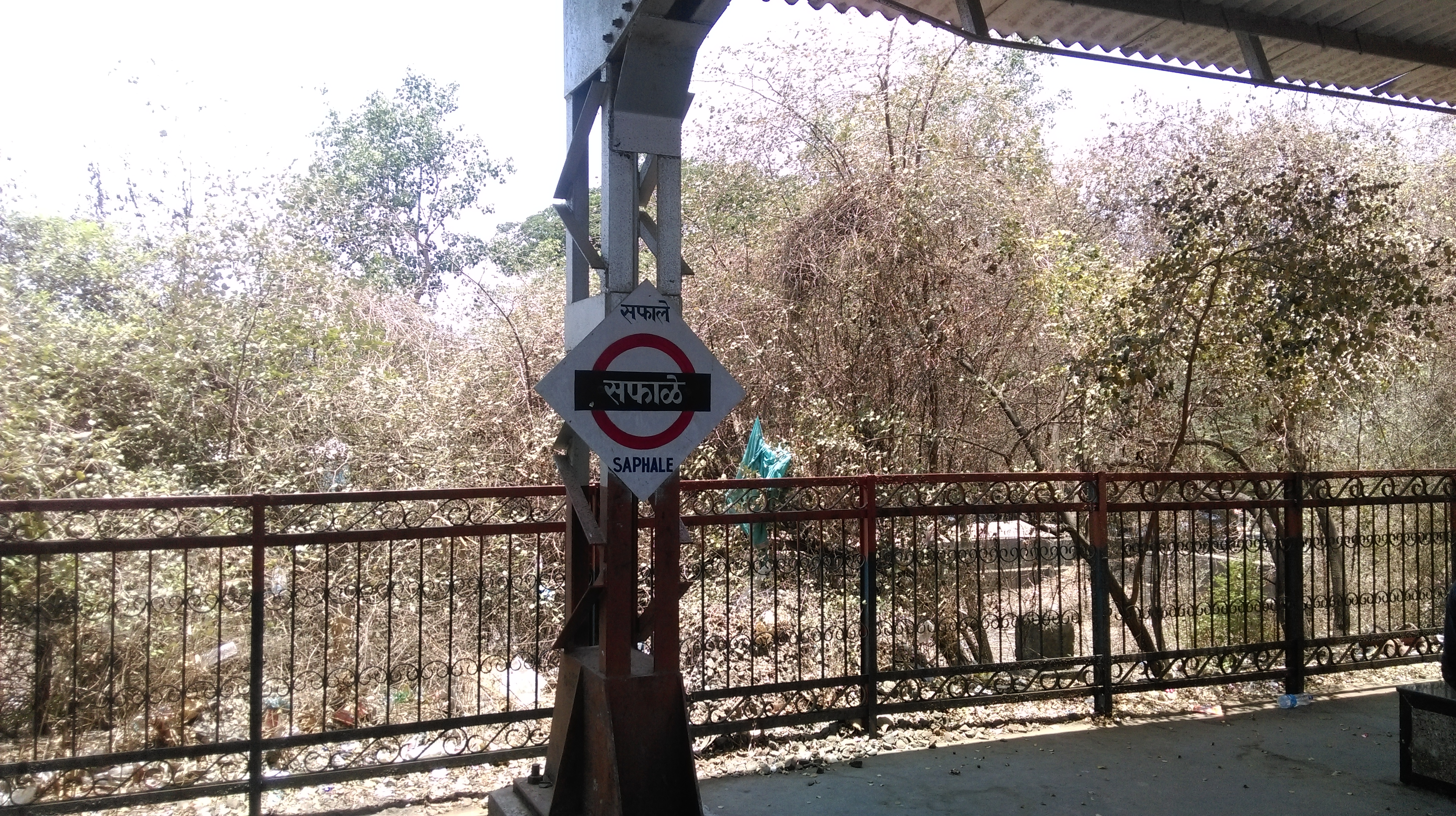
Saphale railway station - Platform board

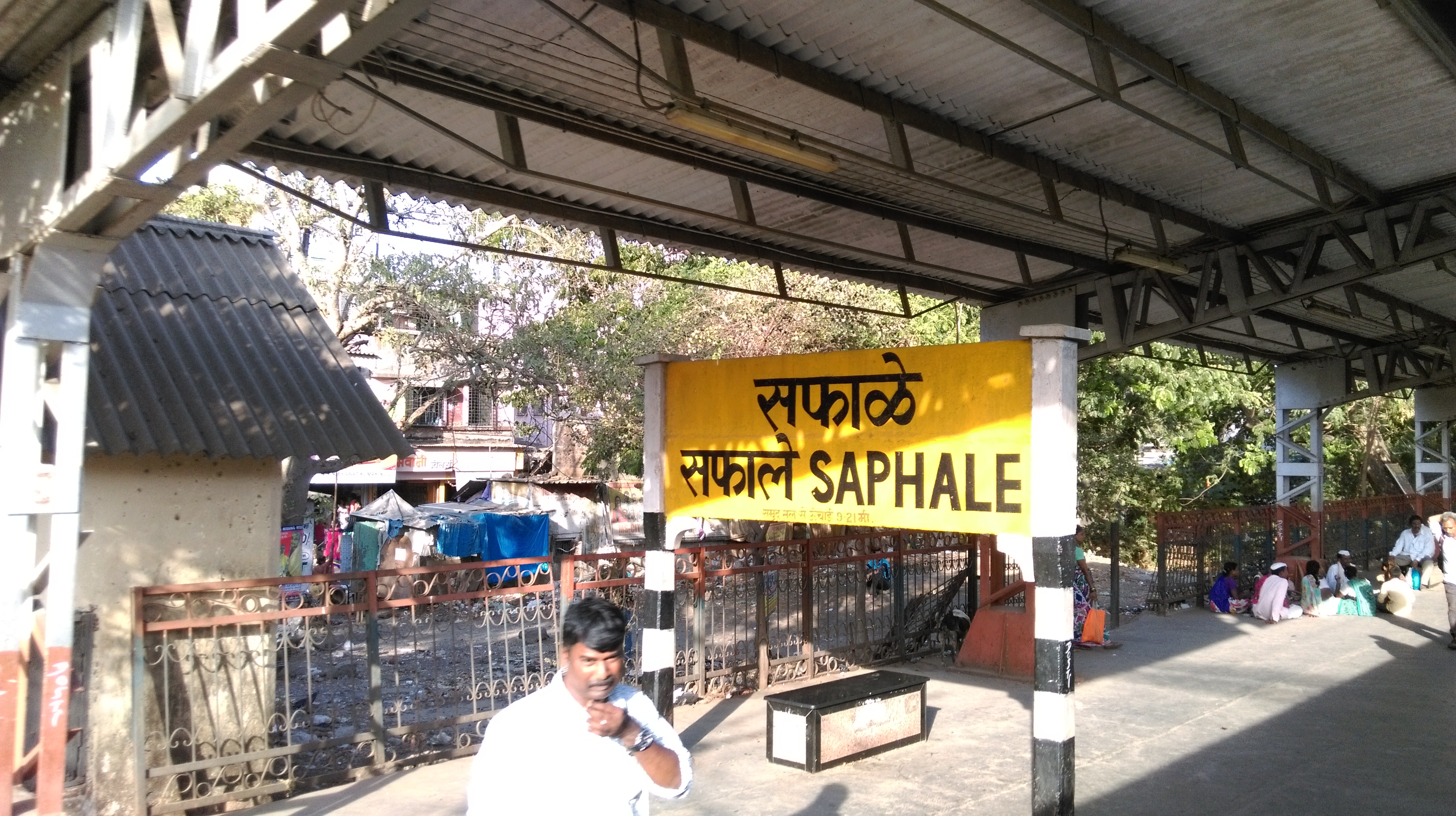
Saphale railway station - Station board

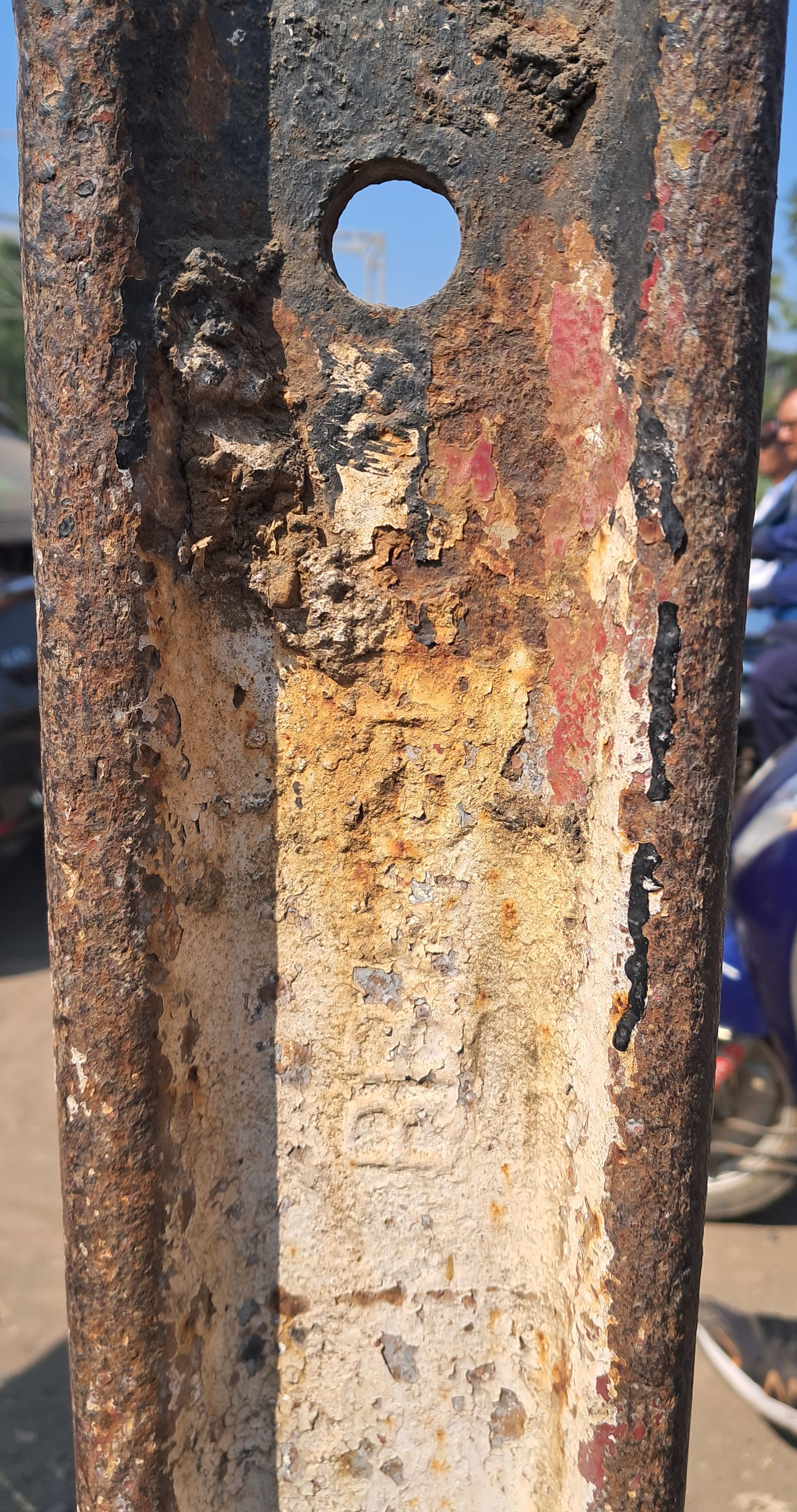
An Old track with BB&CI inscriptions at Level crossing
