= Modak Sagar =

- Location within Maharashtra
- Location: Thane, Maharashtra
- Coordinates: 19.692294°N 73.344284°E
- Type: reservoir, fresh water
- Basin countries: India
- Water volume: 16,500,000,000 imp gal (0.075 km^{3})
- Surface elevation: 80.42 m (263.8 ft)
- Settlements: Mumbai

Modak Sagar is a lake located in Thane district on the Vaitarna River. It has an overflow level of 163.15 meters, making it the second largest of the lakes supplying water to the city of Mumbai.

== History ==
Special engineer Mr. N.V.Modak also known as Nanasaheb Modak, who designed and executed Mumbai's Marine drive was the author of 'Outline of the master plan for Greater Bombay' which is still in the archives of Municipal Corporation of Greater Mumbai.

To solve the potable water supply issue for Mumbai, he took up the project and inspected all the three districts of Nashik, Pune and Thane and found that the Vaitarna river flowing from Igatpuri in Nashik district to Khardi in Thane district has a good flow of water. They built a dam on the river nearby and built a lake.

The dam was built in 1956. From that lake, water started coming to Mumbai every day from 1957. In memory of this talented engineer, the corporation named the lake 'Modaksagar' after Nanasaheb Modak.

== Access ==
The Dam premises are protected by the state government. Access is only for officials from the MCGM, however if anyone wishes to see the dam you need to take permission from their head office at CST.

== Flora and fauna ==
The lake is home to crocodiles that inhabit the shallow waters near its coast
