= Lower Vaitarna Dam =

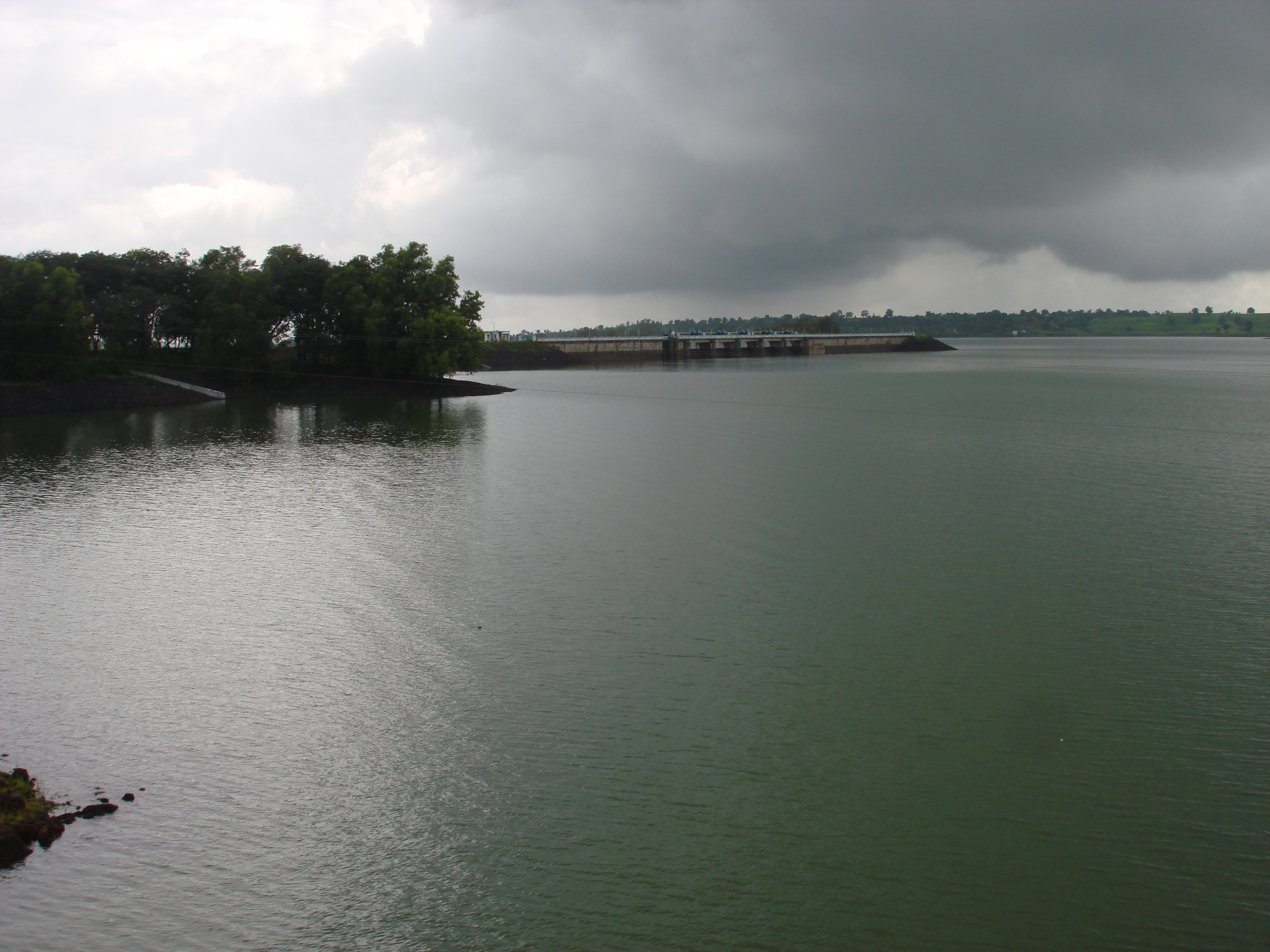

- Location within Maharashtra
- Official name: Vaitarna Dam / Modaksagar Dam
- Location: Palghar Mumbai, Maharashtra
- Coordinates: 19.670841°N 73.2905592°E
- Opening date: 1957
- Owners: Brihanmumbai Municipal Corporation, Mumbai, India

Dam and spillways
- Type of dam: Gravity
- Impounds: Vaitarna river
- Height: 82 m (269 ft)
- Length: 567.07 m (1,860.5 ft)

Reservoir
- Total capacity: 174,790,000 m^{3} (6.173×10^{9} cu ft)
- Surface area: 8.39 km^{2} (3.24 sq mi)

Lower Vaitarna Dam, also called Modaksagar Dam, is a Gravity dam on Vaitarna river which supplies water to Palghar and Mumbai, but is located in Palghar & Nashik district in the state of Maharashtra in India. It was opened in 1957.

== Specifications ==
The height of the dam above lowest foundation is 82 m (269 ft) while the length is 567.07 m (1,860.5 ft). The gross storage capacity is 204,980.00 m^{3} (7,238,800 cu ft).

== Purpose ==
- Water supply

== See also ==
- Middle Vaitarna Dam
- Upper Vaitarna Dam
- Dams in Maharashtra
- List of reservoirs and dams in India
