= Virathan =

Village in Maharashtra

Virathan is a small village in Palghar district, Maharashtra, India. The village is located at a distance of 5.7 km from Saphale Railway station, west side. Facility wise there are schools ( Abhinav Vidyalay ), it have many tourist spots, including pond forest and wagh dev temple.
