= Middle Vaitarna Dam =

Dam in India

Coordinates: 19°42′23″N 73°25′57″E

The Middle Vaitarna Dam is a notable dam located in Maharashtra, India. With a height of 84 metres (276 ft), it is the third tallest dam in the state and is constructed using roller compacted concrete.

Situated in Kochale village in Thane, the dam was built in 2012 on the Vaitarna river. It stands at an elevation of 102 metres (335 ft) and serves the crucial purpose of impounding 455 million liters of water, which is essential to meet Mumbai's growing water demands. Currently, the city receives only 3,400 million liters per day (Mld) while the demand stands at 4,000 Mld. To address this shortfall, the water from the dam is planned to be transported via a 40 kilometres (25 mi) pipeline to the Bhandup treatment plant for delivery to the city.

The project received partial funding from the Jawaharlal Nehru National Urban Renewal Mission. The implementation of the project resulted in the submergence of more than 3,473 hectares (8,580 acres) of land, including approximately 634 hectares (1,570 acres) of forests. Furthermore, the project had an impact on eight villages and various adivasi padas in the area. Regrettably, only 35 families who lost their homes were provided rehabilitation in a colony near the project site in Kochale village. A visit to the rehabilitation colony in 2012 and again in January 2014, a year after the affected families moved in, revealed an alarming lack of construction quality.

== See also ==
- Lower Vaitarna Dam
- Upper Vaitarna Dam
