= Upper Vaitarna Dam =

- Location within Maharashtra
- Official name: Upper Vaitarana Dam D03188
- Location: Igatpuri
- Coordinates: 19.8143122°N 73.5428669°E
- Opening date: 1973
- Owner: Government of Maharashtra

Dam and spillways
- Type of dam: Earthfill; Gravity
- Impounds: Vaitarna and Godavari rivers
- Height: 41 m (135 ft)
- Length: 2,531 m (8,304 ft)
- Dam volume: 1.520×10^{6} m^{3} (53.7×10^{6} cu ft)

Reservoir
- Total capacity: 0.332 km^{3} (0.080 cu mi)
- Surface area: 37.130 km^{2} (14.336 sq mi)

Upper Vaitarna Dam, is an earthfill and gravity dam on west flowing Vaitarna river near Igatpuri, Nashik district of Maharashtra state in India. The reservoir created by this dam spreads on both Vaitarna and Godavari rivers catchment area.

== Specifications ==
The height of the dam above its lowest foundation is 41 m (135 ft) while the length is 2,531 m (8,304 ft). The volume content is 1.520×10^{6} m^{3} (53.7×10^{6} cu ft) and live storage capacity is 331×10^{6} m^{3} (11.7×10^{9} cu ft).

== Purpose ==
- Municipal water supply to Mumbai city and hydroelectricity (60 MW).

== See also ==
- Vaitarna Dam
- Middle Vaitarna Dam
- Dams in Maharashtra
- List of reservoirs and dams in India
