= Kelve Road railway station =

Railway station in Maharashtra, India

Kelve Road

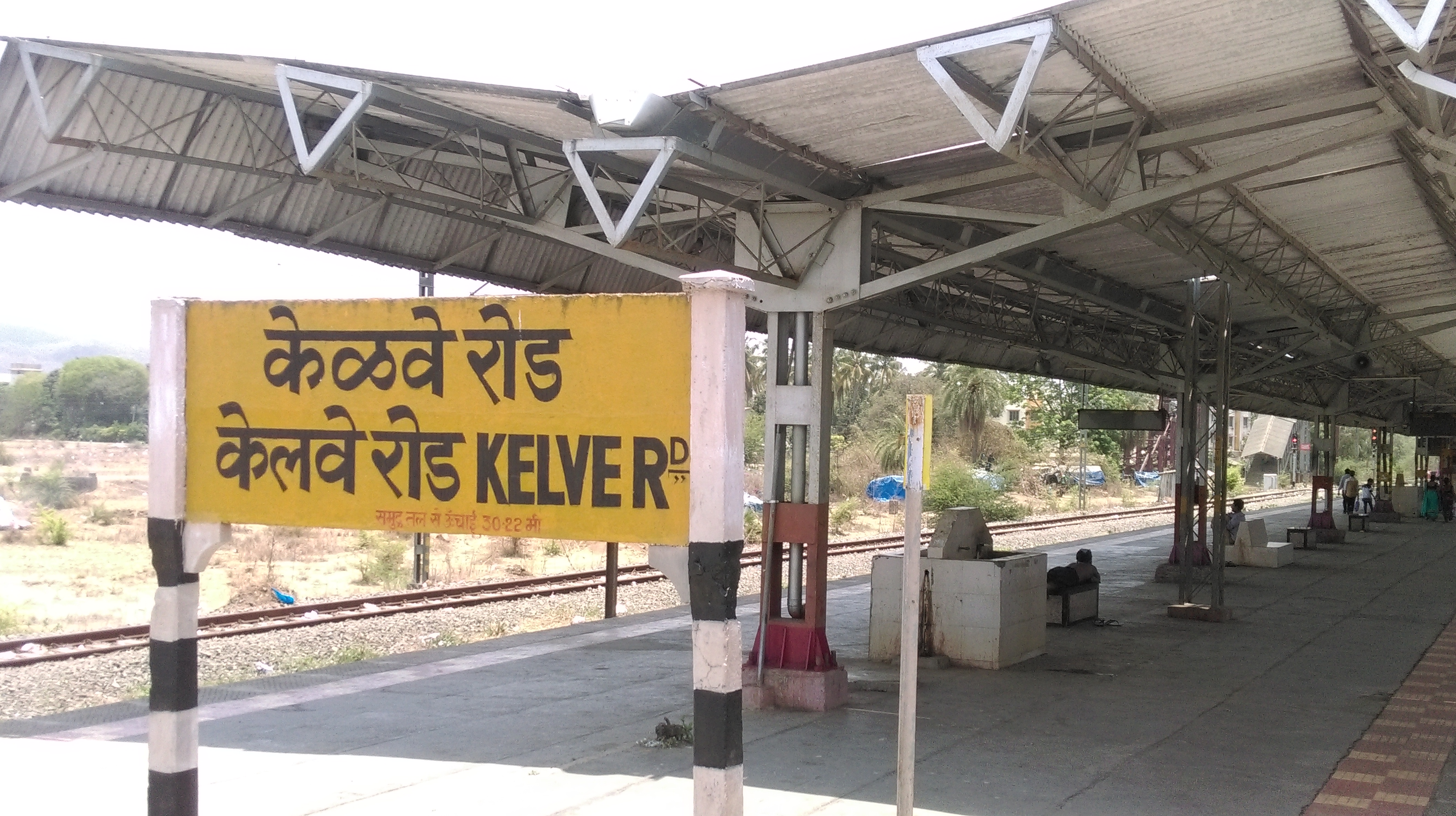

General information
- Location: Kelwa
- Coordinates: 19.625437°N 72.790987°E
- Elevation: 30.220 metres (99.15 ft)
- System: Mumbai Suburban Railway station
- Owner: Indian Railways
- Line: Western Line
- Platforms: 3
- Tracks: 4

Construction
- Structure type: Standard on-ground station
- Parking: Available

Other information
- Status: Active
- Station code: KLV
- Fare zone: Western Railways

Services
Preceding station	Mumbai Suburban Railway	Following station
Saphale towards Churchgate	Western line	Palghar towards Dahanu Road
Route map
Location
- Location within India Location within Maharashtra

Kelve Road is a railway station on the Western line of the Mumbai Suburban Railway network. The station code is KLV. It has three platforms.

It is located in Palghar district of Maharashtra state in Konkan division of Western Railway Zone. Kelve Road railway station lies on the Virar-Dahanu local train service. All Dahanu Road bound local trains from Mumbai Western Rail route halt at this station. This is the third station after Virar, moving towards Dahanu Road.

Kelve is very popular for its clean beaches and dam. Many tourist visit here throughout the year for the same reason. The Kelwa Beach is around 12 km away from the railway station.

== Platforms ==
The station has three platforms, two of which lie on an island platform. The ticket office, along with a Roofed Waiting Hall lie inside the station building. This lies adjacent to platform no.1, near the western entrance.

== Gallery ==
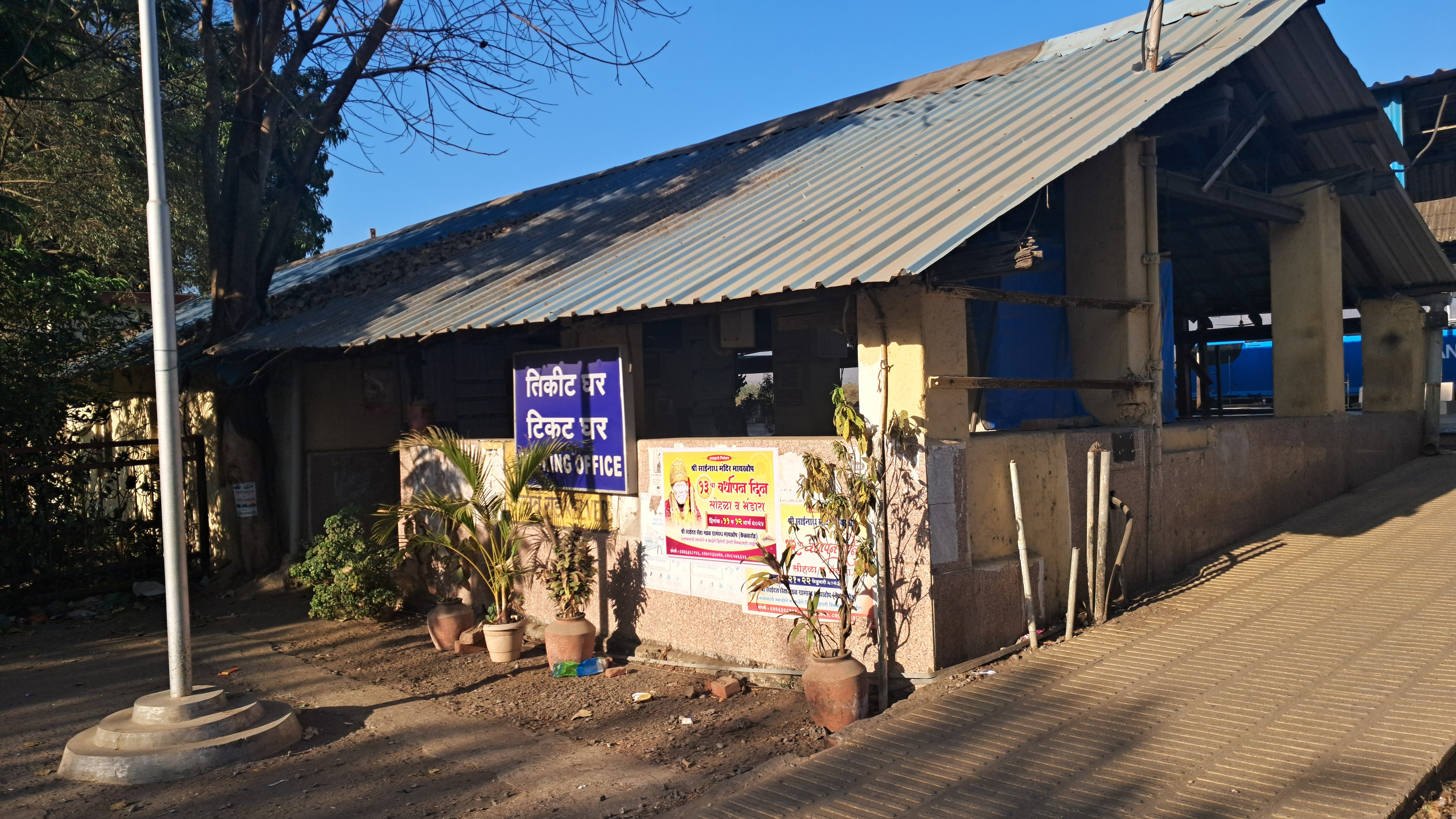
Kelve Road's old station building housed a ticket office and waiting hall

Side view of the old station building

Rear view of the building, depicting the stone structure

The former waiting hall of the station building

View of the waiting hall and ticket window

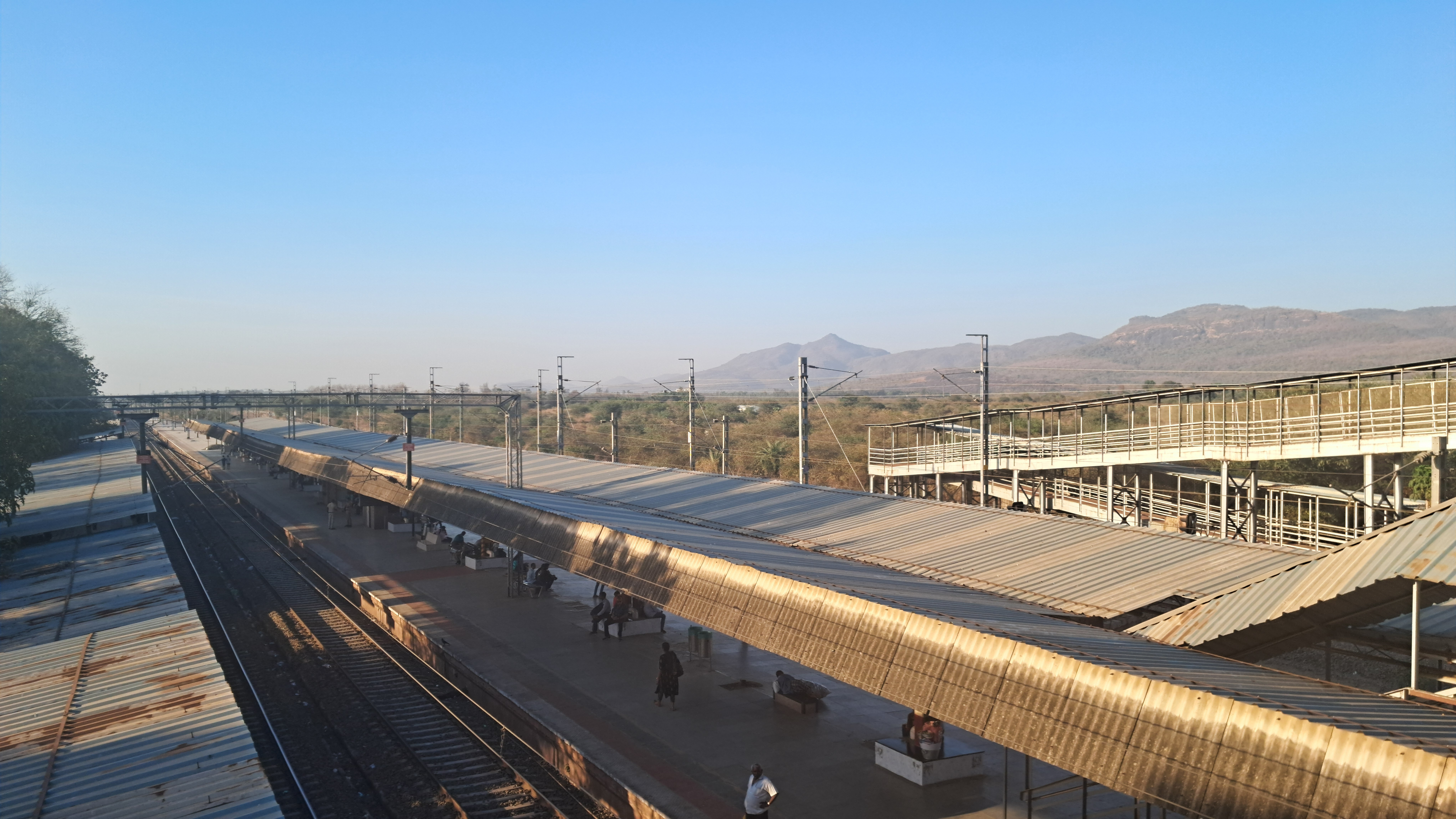
Northward view of the station from FoB.

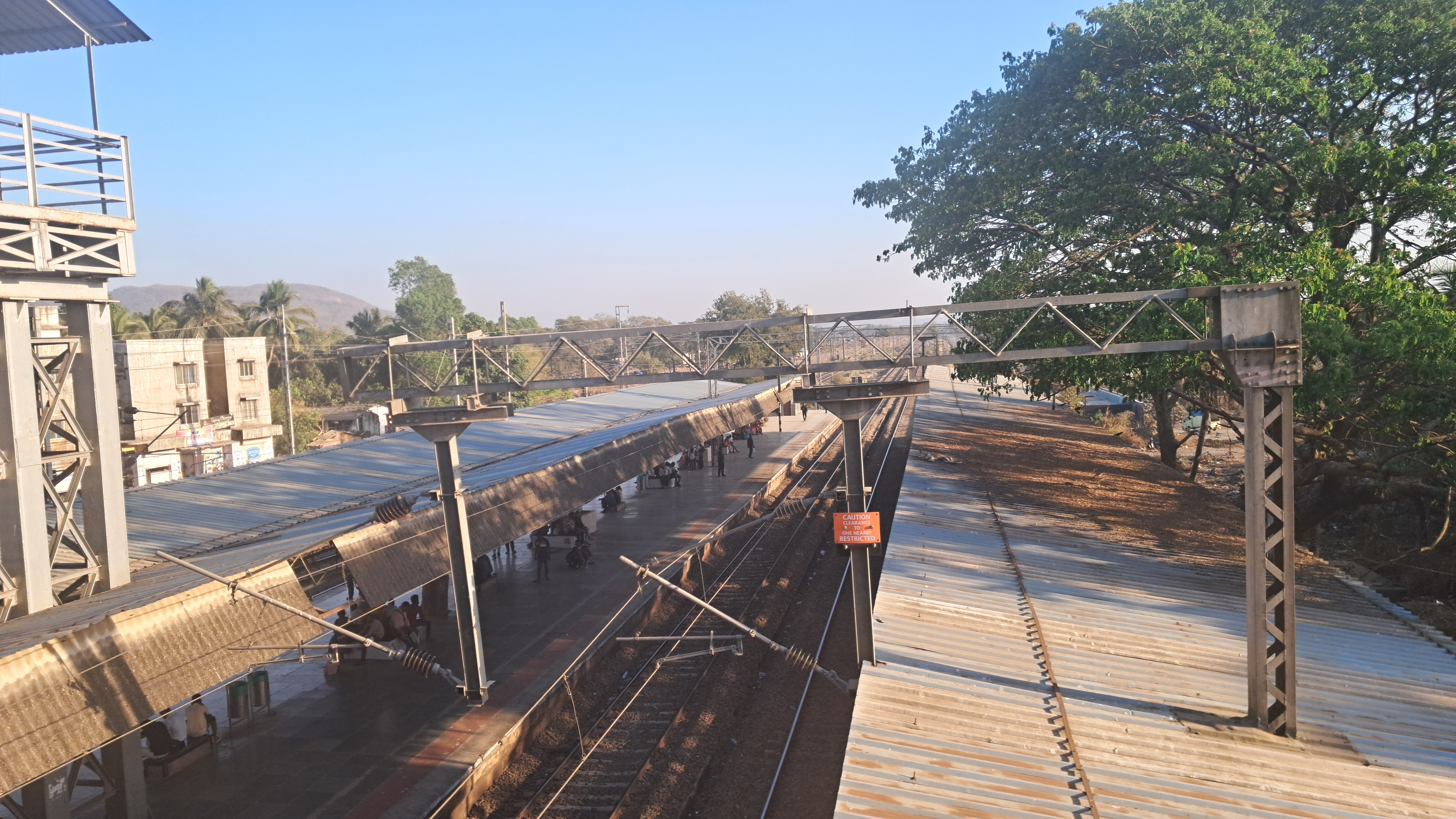
Southward view of the station from FoB

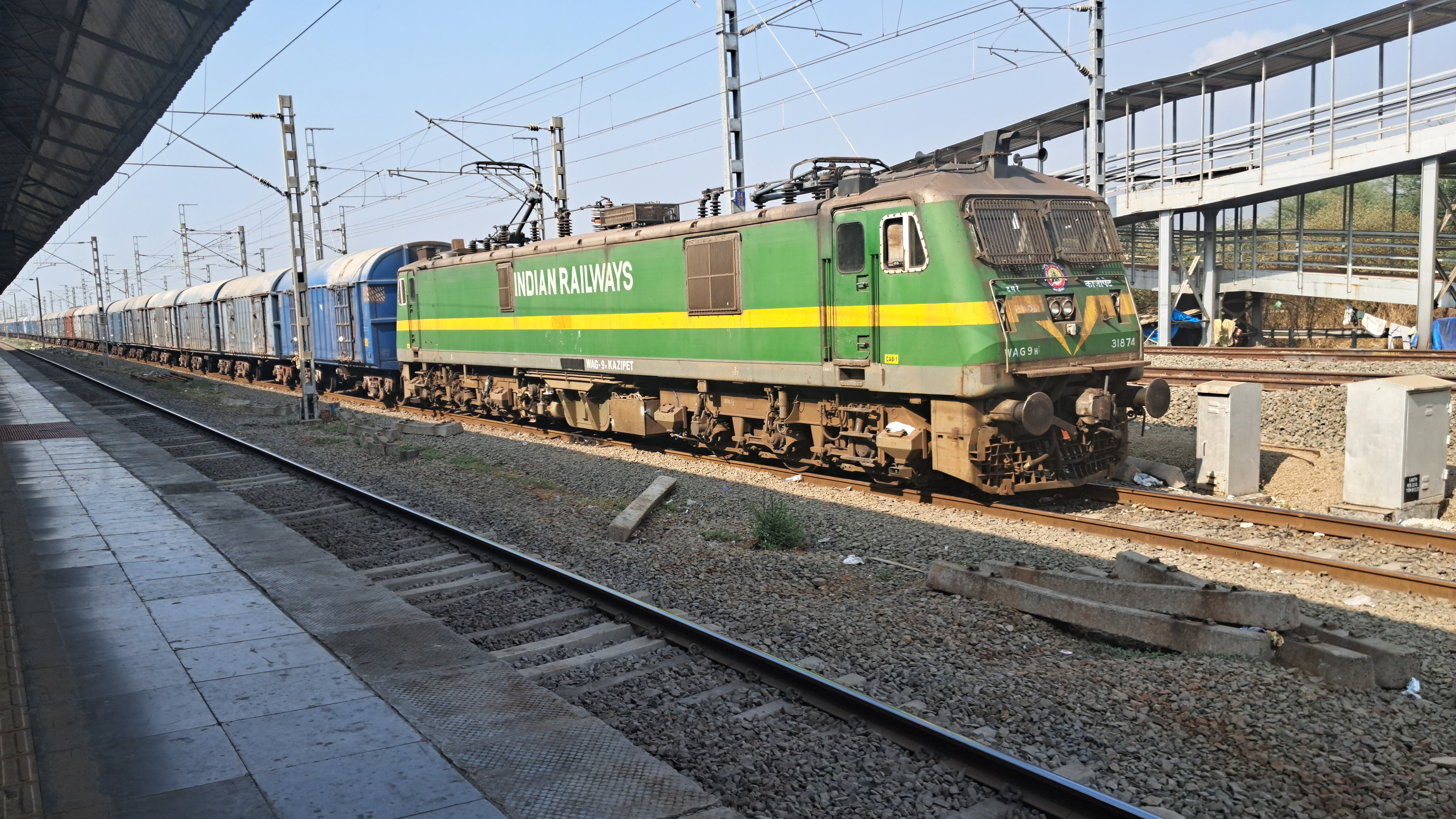
WAG-9 hauls a goods train at Kelve Road station

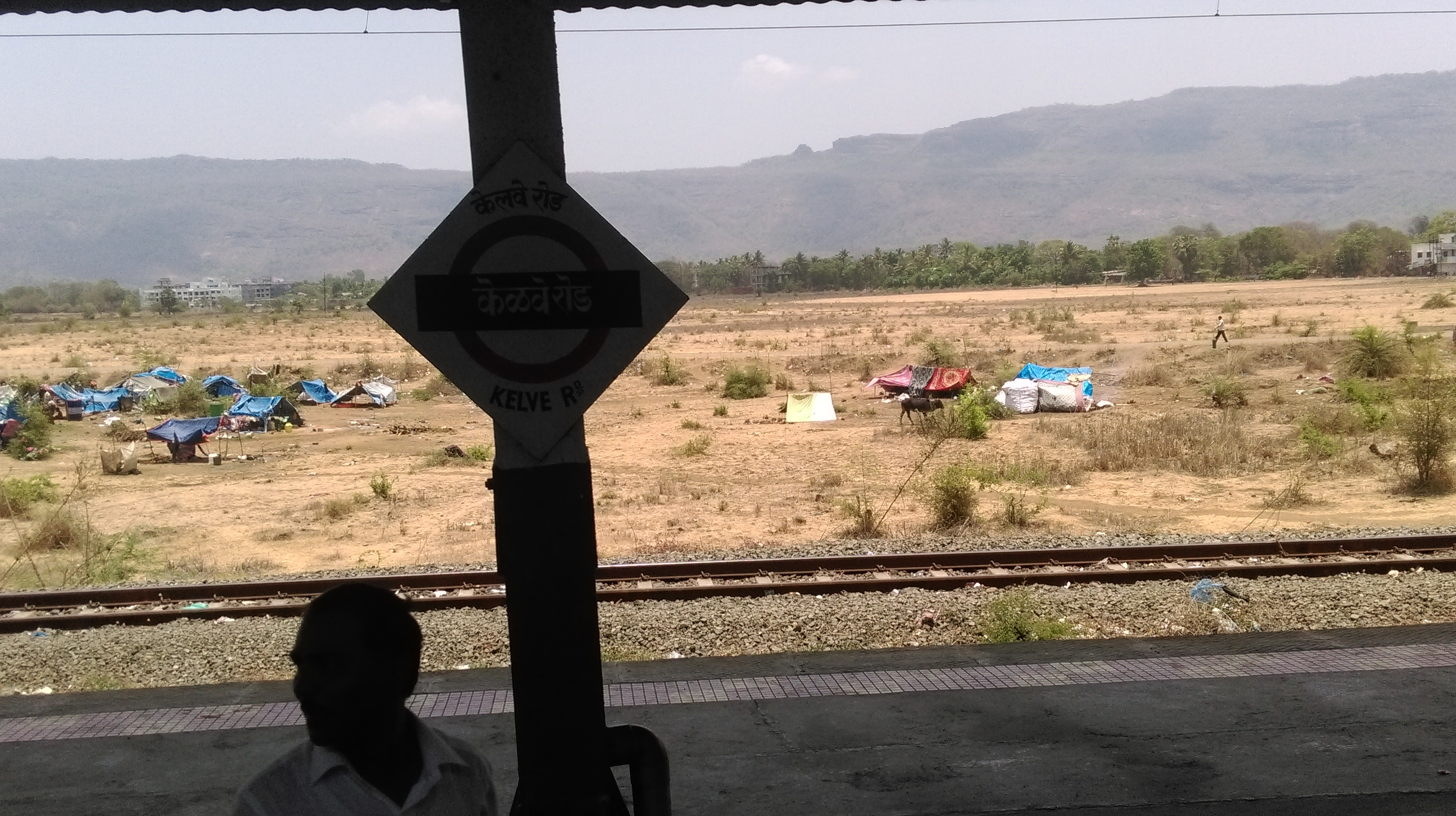
Kelve Road railway station – platform board
