= Saphale =

- Town
- Saphale in Maharashtra, India
- Coordinates: 19.578679°N 72.821247°E
- Country: India
- State: Maharashtra
- District: Palghar
- Gram Panchayat: Saphale-Umbar Pada, Makunsar, Edwan, Datiware

Population (2013)
  - Total: 19,793 (including neighboring villages)

Languages
  - Official: Marathi
- Time zone: UTC+5:30 (IST)
- Postal code: 401102
- Vehicle registration: MH-48 (Palghar District RTO)

Saphale (also spelled Safāle or Saphala) is a town in Palghar Taluka in Palghar District in Maharashtra, India, north of the mouth of the Vaitarna River. According to Census 2011 information, the location code or village code of Saphale village is 552293. Pin code of saphale is 401102 post office : Umbarpada.It is situated 20 km away from sub-district headquarter Palghar. As per 2009 stats, Saphala is the gram panchayat of Saphale village. Gramin Shikshan Santha's Rajguru Hareshwar Mahadev Pandit Vidyalaya and Nikhil Rajan Gharat Mahavidyalaya, Late Chandraprabha Chittaranjan Shroff English medium school these are education firms in Saphale.

== Administrative divisions ==
There are more than 40 villages in the area. On the west side of the railway station lie Dandakhadi, Makunsar, Aagarwadi, Vilangi Tighare, Nagave, Ambode, Dativare, Khardi, Chatale, Usarani, Edvan, Kore, Dongare, Mathane, Bhadave, Mande, Makane, Virathan, and Chikhalpada. On the east lie Pargaon, Tandulwadi, Lalthane, Girale, Nawaze, and Varai.

== Religion ==
Saphale's temples include Kurlai Devi Temple, satvadevi mata temple, Saibaba Temple, Charbhuja Temple, Shree Datta Tample, Siv Sankar Temple, Harbadevi Temple Dongare, Hunuman Temple, and Mahavir Temple. Saphale is also the site of the Brahma Kumaris Om Shanti Retreat Centre.

== Economy ==
The surrounding area includes an industrial area and several power stations owned by Reliance Energy. The Saphale Palghar belt also has many saltworks.

== Tourism ==
Scenic spots include Tandulwadi Fort, Karwale Dam, BhavaniGad - Madhukar Ngar, Kore Vartak Beach, and Edvan Ashapuri Mandir. Vihang vihar resort, Datiware, satvadevi Mandir (Datiware Khardi)kurlaimata mandir (saphalegav)

== Transportation ==
Saphale railway station is on the Western Line of the Mumbai Suburban Railway. Saphale is 18 km away from the Mumbai-Ahmedabad National Highway 8 from Varai Naka.
