= Kalva =

- Municipality
- Location within Azerbaijan
- Coordinates: 40°43′44″N 48°28′52″E
- Country: Azerbaijan
- Rayon: Agsu

Population
  - Total: 3,772
- Time zone: UTC+4 (AZT)
  - Summer (DST): UTC+5 (AZT)

Kalva (also, Kel’va, Kyal’ve, and Kyalva) is a village and municipality in the Agsu Rayon of Azerbaijan. It has a population of 1,772.
