= Datiware =

Village in Maharashtra

Coordinates: 19.510498°N 72.772311°E

Datiware is a village in the state of Maharashtra (Palghar taluk, Palghar district) in India on the northern bank of Datiware creek at the mouth of the river Vaitarna. This area is especially famous for its birds and is a popular destination for birdwatchers in winter.

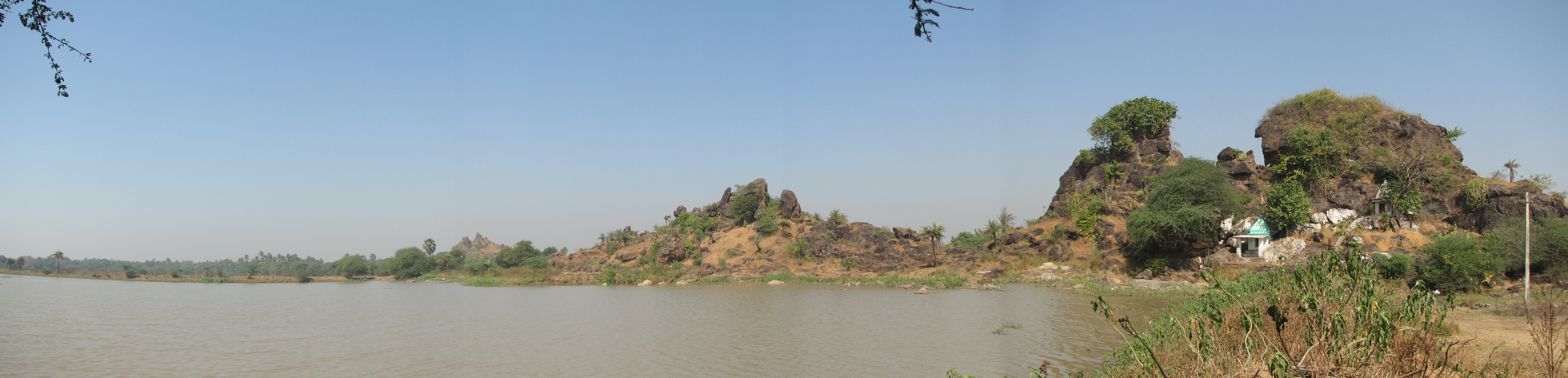

== Demographics ==
As of the 2001 Indian census, Datiware had a population of 1,489. Males constitute 745 of the population and females 744. Number of total households was 326.

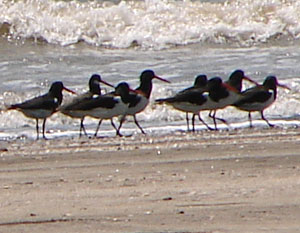
Eurasian oystercatchers (Haematopus ostralegus)

Heuglin's gulls (Larus heuglini)

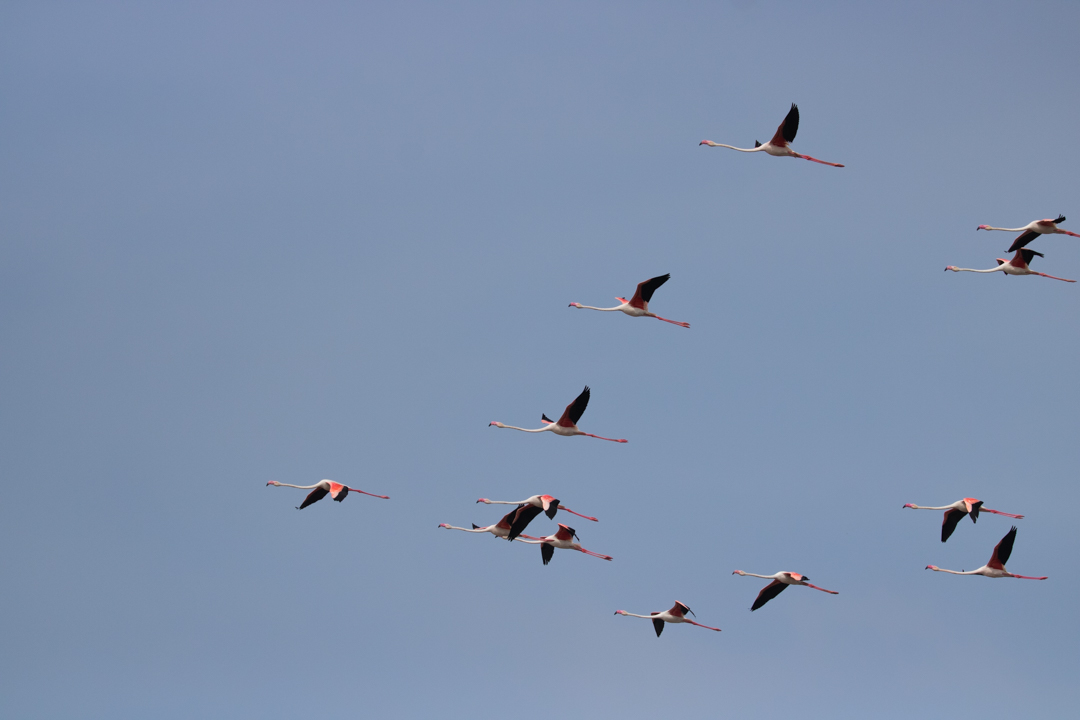
Greater Flamingo (Greater Flamingo)

The area has a variety of habitats including rural agricultural fields, estuary and sea-shore.

== Location ==
Datiware is 100 km from Dahisar Checkpost. On the Mumbai-Ahmedabad highway, take a left turn at Varai Phata (45 km from Dahisar). From Varai phata reach Saphale station. Take a right turn from Saphale station and follow the sign boards to Datiware.

It can also be reached by sea from Arnala village where a small launch may be available to reach Datiware.

By rail, one has to travel to Saphale station on the Western railway line. From here you can get state transport buses or private vehicles to Datiware

A new route via sea has been started from Virar (chikhal dongari), with the coordinates of 19°29'39.9"N 72°47'35.8"E.

== Fish and fishery ==
The area also has numerous mudskippers and other species of fish. They are locally called nivthi and the species found here is Boleophthalmus dussumieri.

Kolim fishery is a seasonal type of fishing followed in the coastal villages of thane district. Women and children use simple nets in the near shore areas to catch a tiny mysid shrimp, Mesopodosis orientalis, which is a rather uncommon crustacean. The kolim season in datiware is from March to May.

== History ==
Dativre ( Dantivra ) Fort was a seaport in the Mahim Subdivision, Thana (now Palghar) District, Bombay Presidency. Ten miles south east of Mahim. Latitude 19° 17' N, Longitude 72° 50' E. Near the town was a small ruined fort probably built by the Portuguese. Average annual trade for five years ending 1878-79, £11,569 (exports £10,738, imports £831).

== Other references ==
- Kharbhari, J.P., 1982. Marine Fisheries Information Services India.. Central Marine Fisheries Research Institute: 18-23.
- Talwar, P.K. and A.G. Jhingran, 1991. Inland fishes of India and adjacent countries. Volume 2.. A.A. Balkema, Rotterdam.
- "Women first: Report of women in fisheries programme of the ICFS in India (Dossier - Women in Fisheries)". 2. 1997. Archived from the original on 13 June 2008.
- "Census of India 2001".
- "Datiware (Dativra) Location, Map & Weather".
- William Wilson Hunter (1885). The Imperial Gazetteer of India. Trübner & Company. p. 157. "Fort: Dativre ."
- "The Gazetteers Department". Maharashtra State Government.
- https://web.archive.org/web/20111110132345/http://icsf.net/icsf2006/jspFiles/icsfMain/
