= Makunsar =

- Village
- Andaket in Maharashtra, India
- Coordinates: 19.591168°N 72.783551°E
- Country: India
- State: Maharashtra
- District: Thane

Makunsar is a village in Maharashtra, India, located 6 kilometres (3.7 mi) away from Saphale's railway station (Western railway), on the Saphale-Palghar road. Gaon is well known for Temples, because more numbers of temples are seen in this gaon. mainly Shri Datta mandir, Srihari Mandir, Chamunda devi Mandir, Brahma dev Mandir, Sai Baba Mandir, Vetaldev Mandir, Ekveera devi Mandir, and other small temples.

Also Makunsar is declared in future proposed railway station in MMRDA proposal plans between Saphale and Kelve Road. As per MUTP/MRVC quadrupling of the lines between Virar and Dahanu Road with the setting up of eight new stations along this route.
