= Kelwa Beach =

Village in Maharashtra

Kelwa beach Kelva Beach
- village
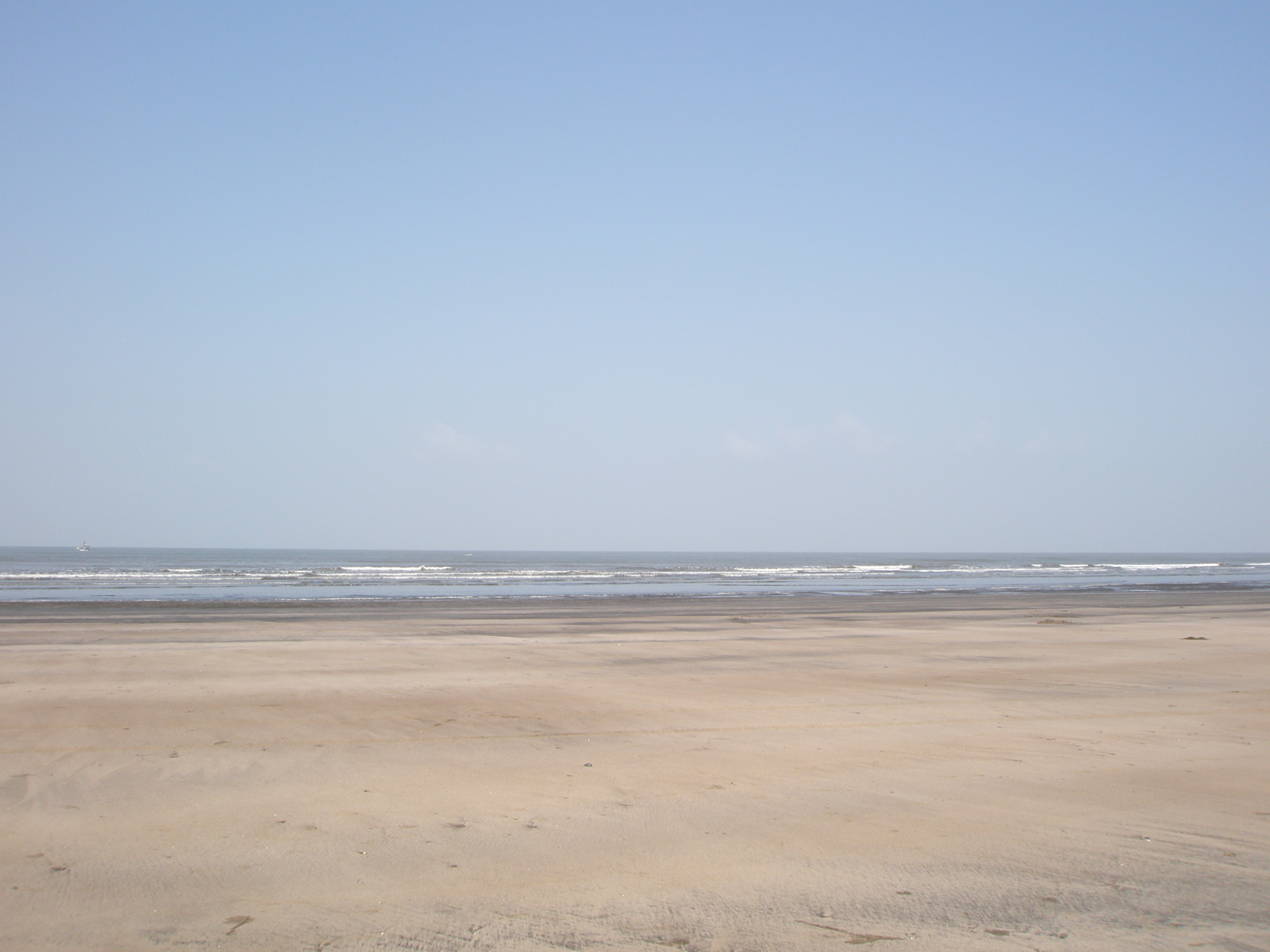

- Location in Maharashtra, India Kelwa beach (India)
- Coordinates: 19°36′46″N 72°43′51″E
- Country: India
- State: Maharashtra

Languages
  - Official: Marathi
- Time zone: UTC+5:30 (IST)

Kelwa Beach, also known as Kelva or Kelwe Beach, is a beach in Maharashtra, India. It is about 8 kilometres long.

== Location ==
Kelwa Beach is situated about 80 kilometres north of Mumbai. It is easily accessible from the Kelve Road station situated about 5 kilometres away. It is also a 25-minute ride on an 8-seater rickshaw from Palghar. It is around 30 kilometers from the highway. Kelwa Beach is also connected by state transport buses which make frequent trips from Palghar or Saphale and Kelwa Road Station.

== Demographics ==
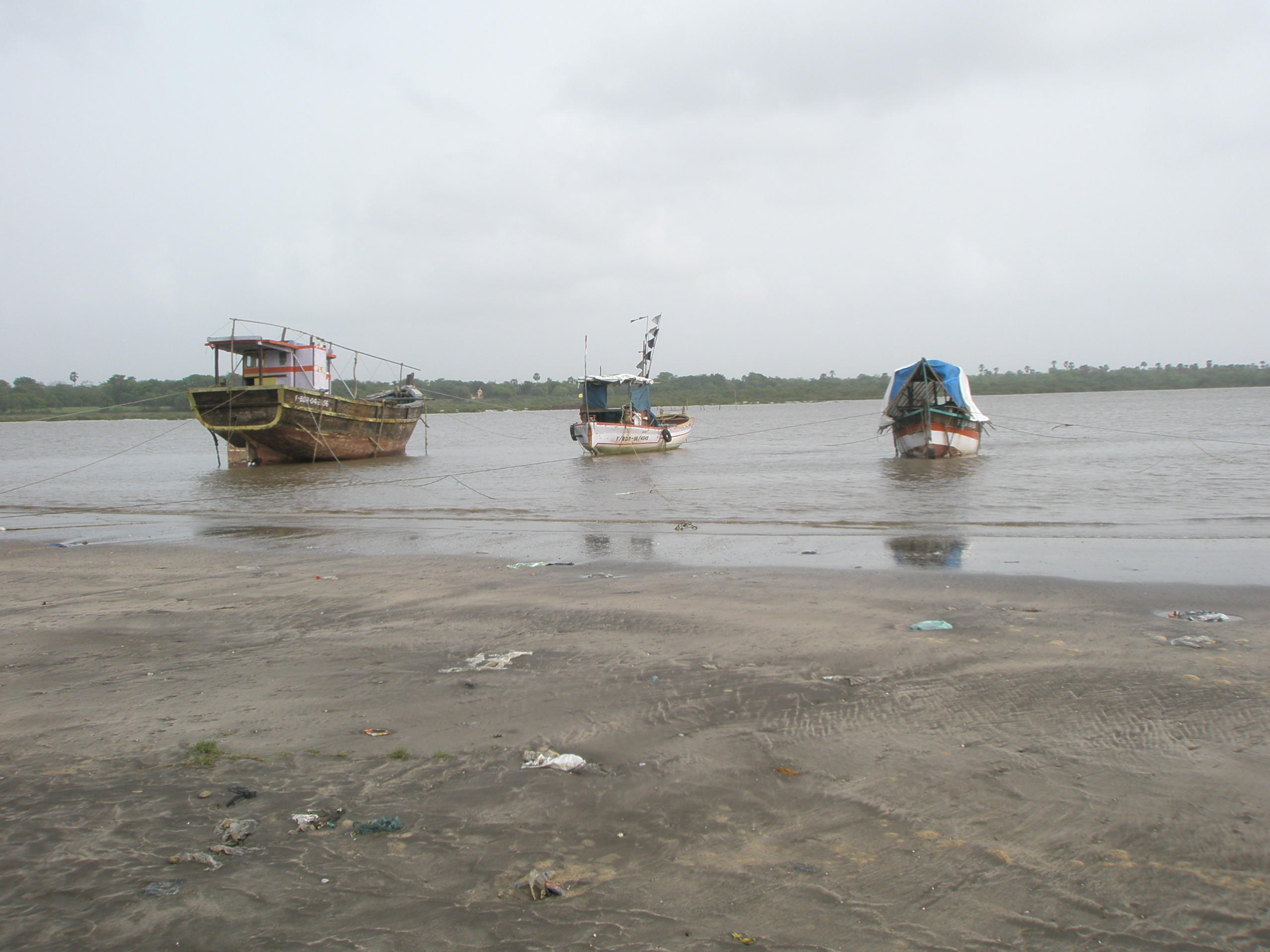
Fishing boats at Kelva Beach

The most important and traditional means of earning is the cultivation of "panmala" (betel leaves). The community which cultivates the malas is popularly known as vadvals (person who cultivates vadis).

The residents of Kelwa Beach are involved in the fishing industry due to the proximity to Satpati, Maharashtra's biggest fishing centre. Some people own or work in factories in the nearby industrial areas of Palghar and Tarapur. Some people have involved in the tourism industry due to the growing popularity of the beach. Many restaurants and snack joints have come up near the beach to cater to the growing number of tourists.

== Shitla Devi Temple ==
The Shitla Devi Temple, a Hindu temple, is situated just beside the beach. It is believed that Prabhu Shri Ram came here and worshipped Lord Shiva. It is also believed that Prabhu Shri Ram prepared a pond with help of his arrow which called Ram Kund and still it is there.

== Forts ==
There are two forts on this beach. One is at the southern tip of the beach and is submerged in sea water during high tides. The smaller one is located within the coniferous trees near the northern tip on the beach.
