= Tansa Dam =

Tansa dam
- Location within Maharashtra
- Official name: Tansa dam D05126
- Location: Mumbai
- Coordinates: 19.5589408°N 73.2623722°E
- Opening date: 1892

Dam and spillways
- Type of dam: Earthfill; Gravity
- Impounds: Tansa river
- Height: 128.63 m (422.0 ft)
- Length: 2,804 m (9,199 ft)
- Dam volume: 2,670 km^{3} (640 cu mi)

Reservoir
- Total capacity: 184,600 km^{3} (44,300 cu mi)
- Surface area: 19.1 km^{2} (7.4 sq mi)

Tansa dam, is an earthfill and gravity dam on Tansa river near Mumbai, Thane district in the state of Maharashtra in India. The dam is one of the seven sources of drinking water to the city of Mumbai.

== Specifications ==
The height of the dam above lowest foundation is 41 m (135 ft) while the length is 2,804 m (9,199 ft). The volume content is 2,670 km^{3} (640 cu mi) and gross storage capacity is 208,700.00 km^{3} (50,069.79 cu mi).

== Purpose ==
- Water supply
- Drinking water

== See also ==
- Dams in Maharashtra
- List of reservoirs and dams in India
