= Khardi =

Hill Station

Khardi is a town in the Thane district, of Maharashtra. It is also a station on the Mumbai Suburban Railway system on the Central line route between Kalyan and Kasara.

It is 1000 ft. above sea - level and is a tourist destination for people from Mumbai. Khardi offers multistory flat projects like Thapar Nagar, Our Town, Highland Park, and Ajmera group.

Khardi is located on National Highway No.3 one of the 4-lane highways which connect India's states.

Khardi is part of Taluka: Shahapur, (District: Thane) which is surrounded by the Sahyadris, and places like Mahuli and Aaja are common spots for trekking. The Maharashtra Government has declared Shahapur a center for tourism. Shahapur had an average literacy rate of 87%, higher than the national average of 59.5%.

District Shahapur supplies the drinking water to Mumbai for which the Government of Maharashtra has declared this town to be a "No Chemical Zone"; no one can start a chemical industry here. Dwellers from Mumbai and surrounding towns have made Khardi their second home while few have migrated to Khardi.

Khardi is accessible by rail or road and is surrounded by three lakes (Bhatsa, Tansa, and Vaitarna), which are a major source of drinking water for Mumbai And Thane city.

About 100 km away from Mumbai (Colaba to Khardi approx. distance), Khardi offers refuge particularly in the post-monsoon months up to the onset of summer (May–June). Three large water fresh bodies surrounding Khardi help keep temperatures down. (Approx. Distance from Thane City is about 60 km)

Dahigaon is a village, near Khardi, on the Khardi to Vaitarana road, which is known for lotus flowers and a lake with two temples of Gavdevi and Lord Shiva on its bank. This village is also the location for the Tansa reserved forest.

== Transport ==
To reach Khardi, travelers take a Maharashtra State Transport bus bound for Kasara or Nashik. If commuting by local train alight at Khardi Railway Station which is one stop before Kasara on Mumbai(CST) to Kasara Route of Mumbai Suburban Railway popularly called Local Trains. It is possible to reach Khardi by road from Mumbai/Thane, driving through National Highway No.3 (NH3).
