= Tansa River =

River in India

Coordinates: 19°32′N 72°53′E

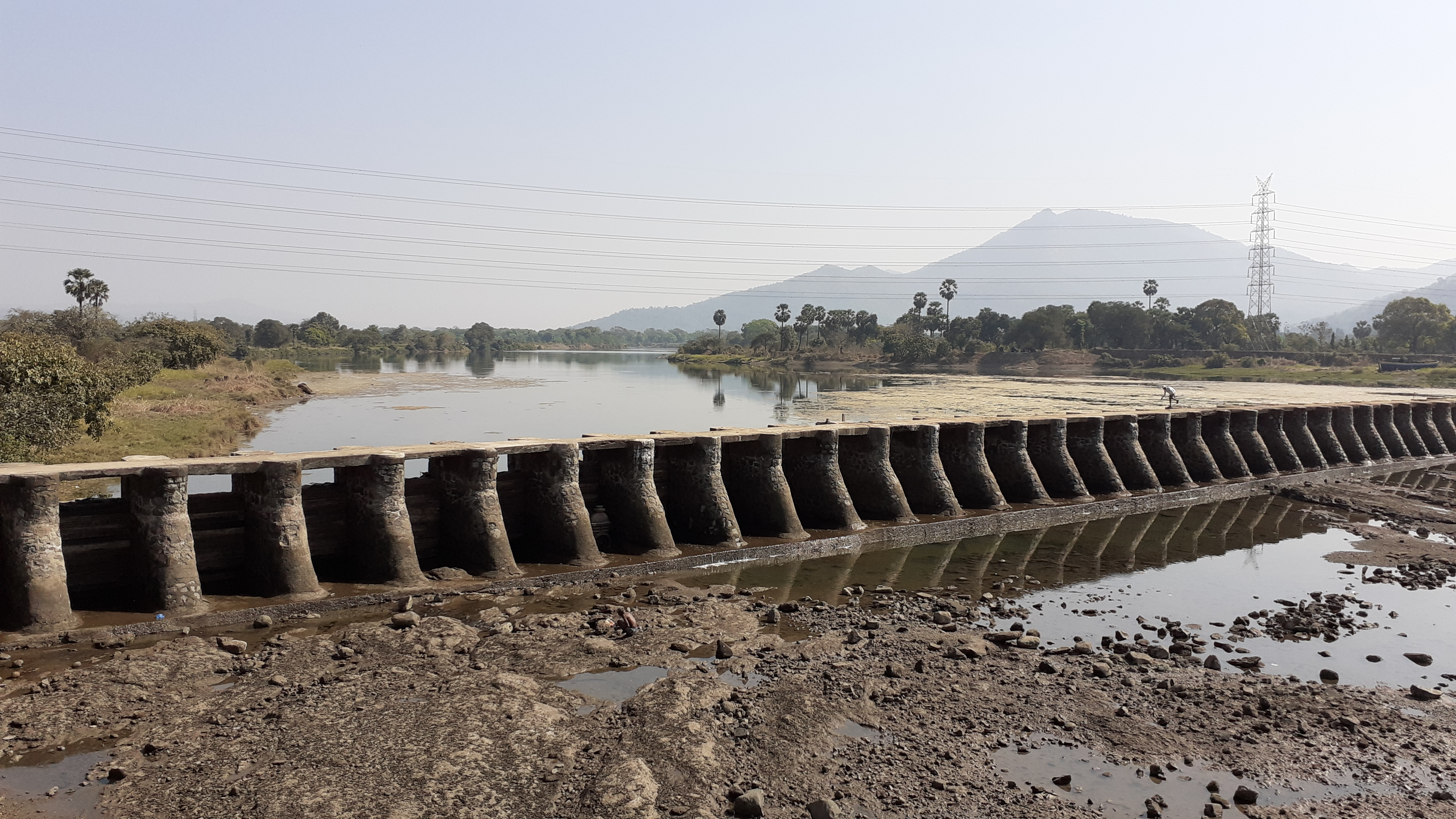
Tansa river in Palghar

The Tansa River is a small river near Mumbai, India and is one of Mumbai's water sources via Tansa Lake. It is embanked by a dam built in 1892, which was then one of the largest masonry dams in the world. The embankment is nearly 2 miles long, 118 ft (36 m) high, and 30 metres thick at the base. The dam has about 38 spillway gates and water retention capacity of 1.31 cubic kilometres.
