= Vaitarna =

Coordinates: 19°42′N 72°56′E

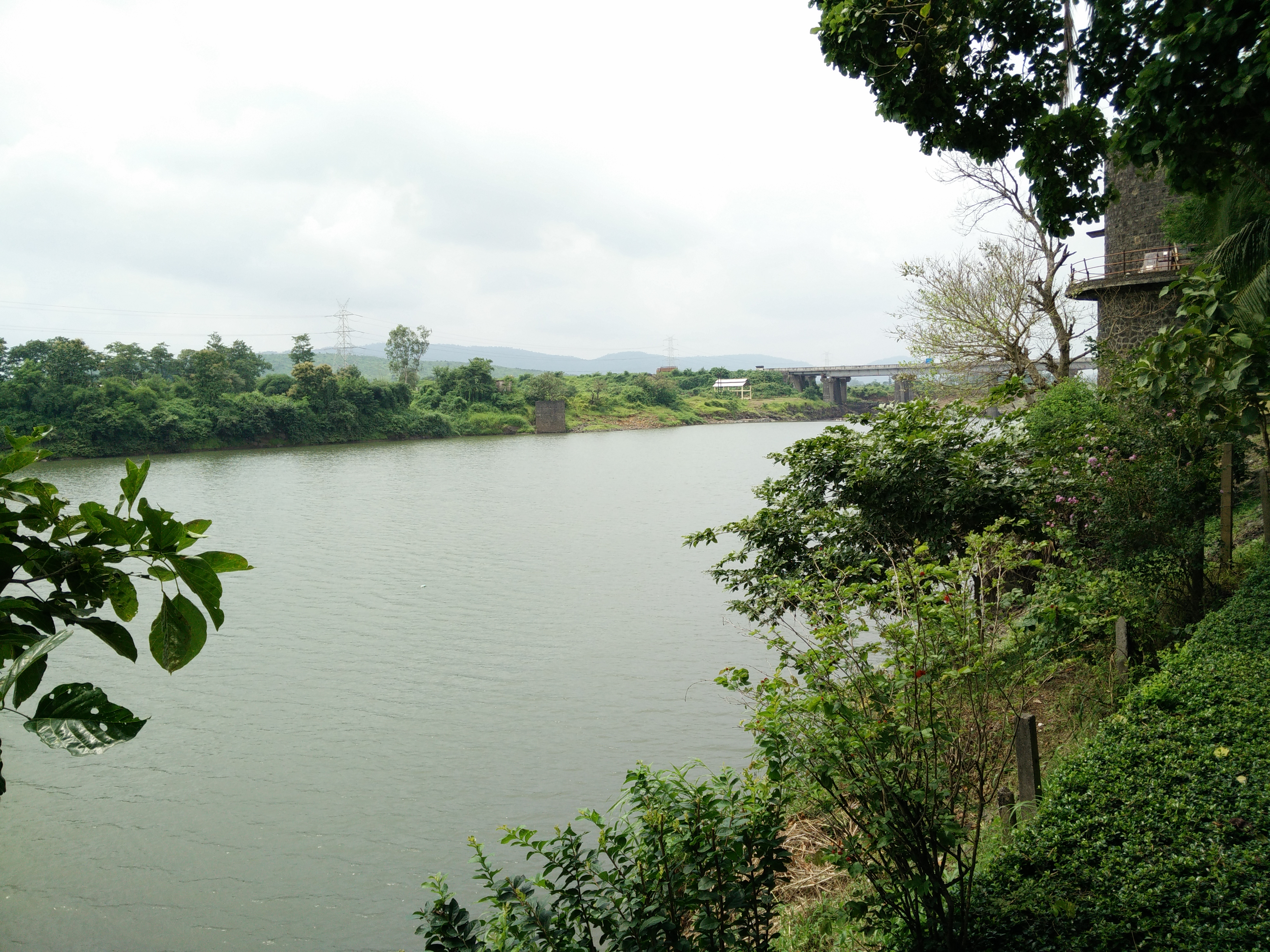
- Vaitarna River, view from Silent Hill Resort

Location
- Country: India

Physical characteristics
- Source: Trimbakeshwar, Nashik
  - location: Maharashtra
- Mouth: Arabian Sea
  - location: Palghar district, Maharashtra
- Length: 154 km (96 mi)approx.

The Vaitarna River (IAST: Vaitarṇā, pronunciation: [ʋəit̪əɾɳaː]) is a river in Nashik and Palghar district of Maharashtra. The Tansa is its left bank tributary and the Pinjal, Dehraja, and Surya its right bank tributaries. Upper stretches of the Vaitarna are clean but in lower stretches discharge of untreated industrial and civic waste makes the Vaitarna one of the most polluted rivers in India.

== Course ==
It originates in Sahyadri mountain ranges near Trimbakeshwar. The Vaitarna is just 2 km away from India’s second longest river, the Godavari. Vaitarna has a confluence with the Tansa just before it enters the Arabian Sea. Jhow and Wadhiv islands lie in its estuary. Arnala Island lies off its mouth. It has three major dams which supply water to Mumbai.

== Significance ==
The Vaitarna supplies much of Mumbai's drinking water. It is the largest river in the Northern Konkan region and drains Maharashtra's whole Palghar district.

== Legacy ==
The SS Vaitarna, a steamship, was named after the river. On 8 November 1888, with hundreds of passengers on board, the ship went missing in the 1888 Arabian Sea cyclone during a crossing from Mandvi to Bombay. The ship was nicknamed Vijli or Bijli, literally electricity, as it was lit with electric bulbs. The missing ship has also been called the "Titanic of Gujarat".

A railway bridge over the river has been in the news for a number of people losing their life while crossing it.
