= List of towns and villages in Thane district =

List of villages and towns in Thane, Maharashtra, India

Location of Thane district in Maharashtra

Thane is one of the 36 districts in the Maharashtra state of India. The district is on the western coast and falls under the Konkan division of the state.

Until 1 August 2014 the district was divided into 15 talukas, viz. Thane, Kalyan, Murbad, Bhiwandi, Shahapur, Vasai, Ulhasnagar, Ambarnath, Dahanu, Palghar, Talasari, Jawhar, Mokhada, Vada, Boisar and Vikramgad. However, on that date the district was split in two with the creation of a new Palghar district, which took 8 of these talukas, leaving the reduced Thane district comprising Thane, Kalyan, Murbad, Bhiwandi, Shahapur, Ulhasnagar and Ambarnath talukas.

The following are separate lists of towns/villages in the reduced Thane district and the new Palghar district. The population data is per Census 2011.

== Thane district ==
=== Ambarnath ===
Ambarnath taluka
| Town/Village Name | Population | Males | Females |
|---|---|---|---|
| Ambarnath | 3,01,752 | 159,184 | 142,568 |
| Ambarnath (R) | 3,623 | 2,106 | 1,517 |
| Ambeshiv Bk | 1,390 | 713 | 677 |
| Ambeshiv Kh | 541 | 284 | 257 |
| Ambhe | 967 | 481 | 486 |
| Asnoli | 241 | 129 | 112 |
| Bandhanwadi | 320 | 163 | 157 |
| Bendshil | 691 | 346 | 345 |
| Bhoj | 627 | 320 | 307 |
| Bohonoli | 773 | 402 | 371 |
| Burdul | 807 | 399 | 408 |
| Chamtoli | 872 | 446 | 426 |
| Chandap | 462 | 216 | 246 |
| Chargaon | 2,667 | 1,331 | 1,336 |
| Chinchavali | 647 | 335 | 312 |
| Chinchavali Bk | 637 | 313 | 324 |
| Chirad | 459 | 237 | 222 |
| Chon | 957 | 508 | 449 |
| Dahivali | 825 | 395 | 430 |
| Dapivali | 403 | 212 | 191 |
| Devaloli | 357 | 173 | 184 |
| Dhavale | 934 | 474 | 460 |
| Dhoke | 742 | 387 | 355 |
| Dhoke (Dapivali) | 343 | 171 | 172 |
| Done | 1,841 | 1,003 | 838 |
| Goregaon | 1,141 | 610 | 531 |
| Gorpe | 803 | 388 | 415 |
| Indgaon | 602 | 300 | 302 |
| Jambhale | 547 | 271 | 276 |
| Jambhilghar | 468 | 233 | 235 |
| Kakadwal | 1,525 | 777 | 748 |
| Kakole | 506 | 246 | 260 |
| Kanhor | 1,431 | 755 | 676 |
| Karand | 835 | 410 | 425 |
| Karav | 1,509 | 819 | 690 |
| Karavale Kh | 805 | 419 | 386 |
| Kasgaon | 1,291 | 633 | 658 |
| Kharad | 970 | 507 | 463 |
| Kudsavare | 816 | 430 | 386 |
| Kumbharli | 389 | 202 | 187 |
| Kushivali | 749 | 367 | 382 |
| Mangrul | 1,805 | 920 | 885 |
| Mulgaon | 1,638 | 861 | 777 |
| Narhen | 1,251 | 618 | 633 |
| Nevali | 1,871 | 932 | 939 |
| Pachon | 63 | 33 | 30 |
| Padirpada | 212 | 115 | 97 |
| Pali | 581 | 302 | 279 |
| Pimploli | 1,348 | 723 | 625 |
| Posari | 1,021 | 508 | 513 |
| Rahatoli | 1,203 | 652 | 551 |
| Sagaon | 353 | 189 | 164 |
| Sai | 1,071 | 549 | 522 |
| Sape | 29 | 17 | 12 |
| Savare | 1,088 | 574 | 514 |
| Savaroli | 245 | 127 | 118 |
| Shil | 460 | 250 | 210 |
| Shiravali | 478 | 254 | 224 |
| Sonavale | 361 | 188 | 173 |
| Tan | 40 | 23 | 17 |
| Umbroli | 83 | 40 | 43 |
| Usatane | 1,151 | 590 | 561 |
| Vangani | 8,193 | 4,271 | 3,922 |
| Varade | 319 | 165 | 154 |
| Wadi | 2,669 | 1,383 | 1,286 |
| Yeve | 703 | 362 | 341 |
| Total | 366,501 | 192,741 | 173,760 |

=== Bhiwandi ===
Bhiwandi taluka
| Town/Village Name | Population | Males | Females |
|---|---|---|---|
| Aatkoli (N.V.) | 420 | 215 | 205 |
| Akaloli | 2,700 | 1,386 | 1,314 |
| Alimghar | 3,353 | 1,702 | 1,651 |
| Alkhivali | 342 | 166 | 176 |
| Amane | 2,501 | 1,281 | 1,220 |
| Ambadi | 1,923 | 965 | 958 |
| Angaon | 3,786 | 1,981 | 1,805 |
| Anhe | 652 | 325 | 327 |
| Anjur | 2,937 | 1,536 | 1,401 |
| Arjunali | 1,119 | 619 | 500 |
| Asnoli Tarf Dugad | 522 | 259 | 263 |
| Asnoli Tarf Kunde | 418 | 218 | 200 |
| Awale | 823 | 412 | 411 |
| Awalwate | 815 | 407 | 408 |
| Bapgaon | 864 | 427 | 437 |
| Base | 566 | 280 | 286 |
| Bhadane | 2,456 | 1,277 | 1,179 |
| Bhare | 945 | 487 | 458 |
| Bharodi | 1,243 | 625 | 618 |
| Bhawale | 297 | 153 | 144 |
| Bhinar | 1,519 | 841 | 678 |
| Bhiwali | 1,196 | 668 | 528 |
| Bhiwandi | 676,429 | 417,764 | 258,665 |
| Bhoirgaon (N.V.) | 358 | 178 | 180 |
| Bhokari | 1,358 | 726 | 632 |
| Borivali Tarf Sonale | 550 | 304 | 246 |
| Borivali Tarf Rahur | 5,115 | 2,625 | 2,490 |
| Borpada | 1,341 | 717 | 624 |
| Brahmangaon (N.V.) | 934 | 469 | 465 |
| Chane | 851 | 431 | 420 |
| Chave | 1,564 | 795 | 769 |
| Chimbipada | 1,218 | 655 | 563 |
| Chinchavali Tarf Rahur | 344 | 196 | 148 |
| Chinchavali Tarf Sonale | 823 | 425 | 398 |
| Chinchawali | 399 | 195 | 204 |
| Chiradpada | 1,006 | 490 | 516 |
| Dabhad | 1,834 | 898 | 936 |
| Dahyale | 197 | 97 | 100 |
| Dalepada | 679 | 344 | 335 |
| Dalonde | 748 | 391 | 357 |
| Dapode | 1,677 | 869 | 808 |
| Depoli | 496 | 250 | 246 |
| Devali | 472 | 252 | 220 |
| Devchole | 298 | 150 | 148 |
| Devrung | 1,590 | 793 | 797 |
| Dhamane | 435 | 209 | 226 |
| Dhamangaon | 2,025 | 1,070 | 955 |
| Dighashi | 2,427 | 1,228 | 1,199 |
| Dive | 1,731 | 876 | 855 |
| Dive Anjur | 2,835 | 1,495 | 1,340 |
| Dohole | 1,251 | 633 | 618 |
| Dudhani | 350 | 176 | 174 |
| Dugad | 2,008 | 989 | 1,019 |
| Dunge | 1,729 | 881 | 848 |
| Eksal | 605 | 299 | 306 |
| Elkunde | 551 | 272 | 279 |
| Firangpada | 643 | 328 | 315 |
| Gane | 728 | 356 | 372 |
| Ganeshpuri | 3,197 | 1,551 | 1,646 |
| Ghadane | 197 | 98 | 99 |
| Gholgaon (N.V.) | 797 | 440 | 357 |
| Ghotavade | 211 | 106 | 105 |
| Ghotgaon | 1,217 | 623 | 594 |
| Gondade | 198 | 92 | 106 |
| Gondravali | 115 | 57 | 58 |
| Gorad | 205 | 100 | 105 |
| Gorsai | 1,779 | 936 | 843 |
| Gove | 2,795 | 1,554 | 1,241 |
| Gundavali | 1,784 | 930 | 854 |
| Hiwali | 858 | 445 | 413 |
| Itade | 1,112 | 589 | 523 |
| Jambhivali Tarf Kunde | 416 | 212 | 204 |
| Jambhivali Tarf Khambale | 713 | 337 | 376 |
| Janwal | 430 | 230 | 200 |
| Junandurkhi | 3,208 | 1,646 | 1,562 |
| Kailasnagar (N.V.) | 405 | 223 | 182 |
| Kalambholi | 376 | 183 | 193 |
| Kalher | 7,485 | 4,000 | 3,485 |
| Kalwar | 2,941 | 1,589 | 1,352 |
| Kambe | 5,086 | 2,859 | 2,227 |
| Kandali Bk. | 403 | 209 | 194 |
| Kandali Kh. | 105 | 46 | 59 |
| Kandali Tarf Rahur | 594 | 325 | 269 |
| Karanjoti | 798 | 415 | 383 |
| Karmale | 315 | 150 | 165 |
| Kasane | 1,395 | 704 | 691 |
| Kasheli | 2,345 | 1,214 | 1,131 |
| Kashivali | 573 | 298 | 275 |
| Kawad Bk. | 1,488 | 773 | 715 |
| Kawad Kh. | 2,843 | 1,475 | 1,368 |
| Kelhe | 283 | 147 | 136 |
| Kewani | 2,186 | 1,110 | 1,076 |
| Khadaki Bk. | 1,071 | 555 | 516 |
| Khadaki Kh. | 323 | 165 | 158 |
| Khadi (N.V.) | 278 | 151 | 127 |
| Khaling Bk. | 1,218 | 630 | 588 |
| Khaling Kh. | 790 | 404 | 386 |
| Khambale | 1,059 | 550 | 509 |
| Khandape | 1,023 | 540 | 483 |
| Khandval | 433 | 222 | 211 |
| Khanivali | 750 | 377 | 373 |
| Kharbav | 5,323 | 2,738 | 2,585 |
| Khardi | 807 | 430 | 377 |
| Kharivali | 615 | 303 | 312 |
| Khativali | 315 | 160 | 155 |
| kimplas | 615 | 303 | 312 |
| Kolivali | 2,294 | 1,178 | 1,116 |
| Kopar | 1,004 | 536 | 468 |
| Koshimbe | 997 | 520 | 477 |
| Koshimbi | 1,193 | 613 | 580 |
| Kuhe | 1,809 | 906 | 903 |
| Kukase | 607 | 324 | 283 |
| Kumbharshiv | 522 | 254 | 268 |
| Kunde | 1,412 | 713 | 699 |
| Kurund | 1,470 | 757 | 713 |
| Kusapur | 411 | 191 | 220 |
| Kushivali | 279 | 145 | 134 |
| Lakhivali | 2,261 | 1,128 | 1,133 |
| Lamaj | 543 | 280 | 263 |
| Lap Bk. | 1,556 | 817 | 739 |
| Lap Kh. | 488 | 261 | 227 |
| Lonad | 2,214 | 1,153 | 1,061 |
| Mahalunge | 660 | 335 | 325 |
| Mahap | 485 | 235 | 250 |
| Mahapoli | 4,439 | 2,316 | 2,123 |
| Mainde | 761 | 381 | 380 |
| Malbidi | 678 | 343 | 335 |
| Malodi (N.V.) | 1,974 | 1,037 | 937 |
| Manivali | 583 | 287 | 296 |
| Mankoli | 2,310 | 1,224 | 1,086 |
| Mohandul | 808 | 405 | 403 |
| Mohili | 735 | 363 | 372 |
| Mohili Bk. (N.V.) | 482 | 249 | 233 |
| Morani | 274 | 133 | 141 |
| Murhe | 421 | 209 | 212 |
| Muthaval | 580 | 307 | 273 |
| Nandithane | 1,099 | 571 | 528 |
| Nandkar | 1,487 | 753 | 734 |
| Newade | 353 | 170 | 183 |
| Nimbavali | 950 | 497 | 453 |
| Nivali | 709 | 347 | 362 |
| Ovali | 1,215 | 652 | 563 |
| Pachchhapur | 660 | 334 | 326 |
| Pahare | 864 | 432 | 432 |
| Pali | 401 | 216 | 185 |
| Palivali | 1,539 | 780 | 759 |
| Palkhane | 691 | 340 | 351 |
| Parivali | 1,453 | 738 | 715 |
| Paye | 3,248 | 1,620 | 1,628 |
| Paygaon | 2,068 | 1,050 | 1,018 |
| Pilanze Bk. | 928 | 479 | 449 |
| Pilanze Kh. | 726 | 377 | 349 |
| Pimpalas | 3,386 | 1,750 | 1,636 |
| Pimpalgaon | 2,023 | 1,187 | 836 |
| Pimpalghar | 1,068 | 649 | 419 |
| Pimpalner | 1,748 | 929 | 819 |
| Pimpalshet Bhuishet | 573 | 279 | 294 |
| Pise | 1,188 | 626 | 562 |
| Pundas | 1,030 | 541 | 489 |
| Purne | 5,368 | 3,170 | 2,198 |
| Rahanal | 6,906 | 4,095 | 2,811 |
| Rahur | 208 | 104 | 104 |
| Rajnagar (N.V.) | 700 | 418 | 282 |
| Ranjnoli | 2,760 | 1,684 | 1,076 |
| Sagaon | 536 | 273 | 263 |
| Saigaon (N.V.) | 310 | 153 | 157 |
| Sakharoli | 603 | 301 | 302 |
| Sange | 502 | 245 | 257 |
| Sape | 1,198 | 612 | 586 |
| Sarang | 735 | 385 | 350 |
| Saravali | 1,877 | 1,075 | 802 |
| Savaroli Tarf Dugad | 332 | 156 | 176 |
| Savaroli Tarf Rahur | 142 | 74 | 68 |
| Sawad | 1,116 | 566 | 550 |
| Sawandhe | 1,885 | 1,199 | 686 |
| Shedgaon | 534 | 284 | 250 |
| Shirgaon | 546 | 279 | 267 |
| Shirole | 1,327 | 730 | 597 |
| Shivajinagar (N.V.) | 450 | 232 | 218 |
| Shivnagar | 2,433 | 1,239 | 1,194 |
| Sonale | 999 | 513 | 486 |
| Sontakka | 908 | 460 | 448 |
| Sor | 691 | 361 | 330 |
| Supegaon | 965 | 497 | 468 |
| Surai | 1,343 | 708 | 635 |
| Suryanagar (N.V.) | 562 | 297 | 265 |
| Talavali Tarf Rahur | 483 | 244 | 239 |
| Talavali Tarf Sonale | 1,284 | 653 | 631 |
| Tembhavali | 1,315 | 686 | 629 |
| Thakurgaon (N.V.) | 1,413 | 865 | 548 |
| Tulshi | 201 | 94 | 107 |
| Umbarkhand | 350 | 180 | 170 |
| Usgaon | 1,536 | 786 | 750 |
| Usroli | 663 | 344 | 319 |
| Vadape | 1,268 | 698 | 570 |
| Vadghar | 1,267 | 682 | 585 |
| Vadunavaghar | 2,584 | 1,322 | 1,262 |
| Vadvali Tarf Rahur | 1,534 | 800 | 734 |
| Vadvali Tarf Sonale | 27 | 12 | 15 |
| Vadvali Tarf Dugad | 999 | 512 | 487 |
| Vafale | 774 | 411 | 363 |
| Vaghivali | 1,545 | 773 | 772 |
| Vahuli | 765 | 397 | 368 |
| Vajreshwari | 2,335 | 1,169 | 1,166 |
| Val | 1,095 | 554 | 541 |
| Vandre | 1,037 | 540 | 497 |
| Vape | 466 | 233 | 233 |
| Vashere | 455 | 252 | 203 |
| Vavali Tarf Dugad | 490 | 245 | 245 |
| Vedhe | 1,270 | 648 | 622 |
| Vehele | 2,340 | 1,208 | 1,132 |
| Vishwagad (N.V.) | 1,374 | 714 | 660 |
| Walshind | 807 | 426 | 381 |
| Waret | 644 | 349 | 295 |
| Yewai | 491 | 252 | 239 |
| Zidake | 1,751 | 940 | 811 |
| Total | 945,582 | 558,758 | 386,82 |

=== Kalyan ===
Kalyan taluka
| Town/Village Name | Population | Males | Females |
|---|---|---|---|
| Adivali | 244 | 111 | 133 |
| Ambivali Tarf Chon | 74 | | 33 |
| Ambivali Tarf Vasundri | 12000 | 7500 | 4500 |
| Anakhar | 540 | 288 | 252 |
| Ane | 540 | 261 | 279 |
| Antade | 181 | 96 | 85 |
| Antarli | 360 | 178 | 182 |
| Apati Tarf Barhe | 430 | 217 | 213 |
| Apati Tarf Chon | 670 | 329 | 341 |
| Arele | 84 | 39 | 45 |
| Bapsai | 662 | 320 | 342 |
| Bere | 261 | 142 | 119 |
| Bhisod | 695 | 382 | 313 |
| Chavare | 749 | 384 | 365 |
| Chinchavali | 766 | 412 | 354 |
| Dahagaon | 835 | 434 | 401 |
| Dahivali | 542 | 264 | 278 |
| Danbav | 766 | 396 | 370 |
| Dhamtan | 185 | 101 | 84 |
| Gerase | 740 | 398 | 342 |
| Ghotsai | 2,482 | 1,260 | 1,222 |
| Goveli | 1,026 | 511 | 515 |
| Guravali | 1,583 | 800 | 783 |
| Jambhul | 2,097 | 1,185 | 912 |
| Ju | 42 | 27 | 15 |
| Kakadpada | 755 | 361 | 394 |
| Kalyan | 1,193,512 | 633,508 | 560,004 |
| Kambe | 4,790 | 2,481 | 2,309 |
| Kelni | 419 | 212 | 207 |
| Khadavali | 2,213 | 1,156 | 1,057 |
| Khoni | 2500 | 1500 | 1000 |
| Kolimb | 463 | 241 | 222 |
| Konderi | 613 | 321 | 292 |
| Kosale | 1,119 | 553 | 566 |
| Kunde | 1,215 | 639 | 576 |
| Mamnoli | 982 | 500 | 482 |
| Manivali | 1,768 | 892 | 876 |
| Manjali Tarf Barhe | 749 | 371 | 378 |
| Mharal Bk | 19,457 | 10,500 | 8,957 |
| Mhaskal | 1,024 | 511 | 513 |
| Mos | 326 | 157 | 169 |
| Nadgaon | 1,198 | 625 | 573 |
| Nalimbi | 489 | 244 | 245 |
| Nandap | 1,024 | 511 | 513 |
| Navgaon | 447 | 217 | 230 |
| Nimbavli | 932 | 490 | 442 |
| Ozarli | 382 | 182 | 200 |
| Pisavali | 696 | 379 | 317 |
| Pisawali | 31,202 | 13,904 | 9,338 |
| Phalegaon | 2,036 | 1,055 | 981 |
| Pimpaloli | 217 | 119 | 98 |
| Pitambare Nagar | 424 | 219 | 205 |
| Poi | 800 | 416 | 384 |
| Rayate | 2,183 | 1,105 | 1,078 |
| Raye | 1,870 | 947 | 923 |
| Revati | 317 | 167 | 150 |
| Ron | 487 | 258 | 229 |
| Runde | 676 | 361 | 315 |
| Sangode | 935 | 465 | 470 |
| Shirdhon | 677 | 331 | 346 |
| Ushid | 687 | 346 | 341 |
| Utane | 834 | 442 | 392 |
| Vadavali Bk. | 1,070 | 537 | 533 |
| Vadavali Kh. | 668 | 352 | 316 |
| Vaholi | 1,292 | 696 | 596 |
| Valkas | 389 | 202 | 187 |
| Varp | 3,264 | 1,686 | 1,578 |
| Vasant Shelvali | 1,692 | 865 | 827 |
| Vasundri | 964 | 517 | 447 |
| Vaveghar | 1,669 | 868 | 801 |
| Vehale | 821 | 422 | 399 |
| Total | 1,276,614 | 676,777 | 599,837 |

=== Murbad ===
Murbad taluka
| Town/Village Name | Population | Males | Females |
|---|---|---|---|
| Agashi | 755 | 391 | 364 |
| Alawe | 290 | 141 | 149 |
| Alyani | 234 | 117 | 117 |
| Ambe Tembhe | 557 | 277 | 280 |
| Ambegaon | 940 | 461 | 479 |
| Ambele Bk. | 1,020 | 537 | 483 |
| Ambele Kh. | 776 | 380 | 396 |
| Ambiwali | 223 | 113 | 110 |
| Anandnagar (N.V.) | 604 | 304 | 300 |
| Anandnagar (N.V.) | 466 | 229 | 237 |
| Askot | 534 | 268 | 266 |
| Asole | 1,447 | 710 | 737 |
| Asose | 628 | 315 | 313 |
| Awalegaon | 497 | 256 | 241 |
| Balegaon | 687 | 344 | 343 |
| Bandhivali | 710 | 375 | 335 |
| Bhadane | 1,235 | 615 | 620 |
| Bhaluk | 1,147 | 585 | 562 |
| Bhorande | 232 | 103 | 129 |
| Bhuwan | 1500 | 750 | 750 |
| Borgaon | 913 | 476 | 437 |
| Boriwali | 383 | 183 | 200 |
| Brahmangaon | 571 | 283 | 288 |
| Bursunge | 466 | 232 | 234 |
| Chafe Tarf Khedul | 261 | 135 | 126 |
| Chandrapur | 547 | 266 | 281 |
| Chasole | 1,049 | 525 | 524 |
| Chikhale | 379 | 199 | 180 |
| Chirad | 437 | 215 | 222 |
| Dahigaon | 783 | 402 | 381 |
| Dahigaon | 467 | 243 | 224 |
| Dahivali | 526 | 262 | 264 |
| Dangurle | 581 | 291 | 290 |
| Dehanoli | 666 | 326 | 340 |
| Dehari | 598 | 312 | 286 |
| Deogaon | 1,559 | 861 | 698 |
| Deoghar | 94 | 47 | 47 |
| Deope | 592 | 304 | 288 |
| Dhanivali | 1,203 | 737 | 466 |
| Dhargaon | 962 | 488 | 474 |
| Dhasai | 2,835 | 1,437 | 1,398 |
| Dighephal | 80 | 42 | 38 |
| Diwanpada | 244 | 120 | 124 |
| Dongar Nhave | 1,604 | 783 | 821 |
| Dudhanoli | 666 | 344 | 322 |
| Durgapur | 718 | 356 | 362 |
| Eklahare | 449 | 231 | 218 |
| Fangaloshi | 589 | 270 | 319 |
| Fangane | 437 | 224 | 213 |
| Fangulgavhan | 1,049 | 504 | 545 |
| Fansoli | 1,093 | 549 | 544 |
| Ganeshpur | 962 | 554 | 408 |
| Ganeshpur | 487 | 256 | 231 |
| Gawali | 862 | 450 | 412 |
| Ghagurli | 317 | 162 | 155 |
| Ghorale | 609 | 309 | 300 |
| Goregaon | 461 | 253 | 208 |
| Hedavali | 342 | 172 | 170 |
| Hireghar | 137 | 64 | 73 |
| Inde | 782 | 386 | 396 |
| Jadai | 700 | 350 | 350 |
| Jaigaon | 435 | 216 | 219 |
| Jambhurde | 1,192 | 607 | 585 |
| Jamghar | 464 | 237 | 227 |
| Kachakoli | 734 | 382 | 352 |
| Kalambad Mu | 339 | 166 | 173 |
| Kalambhe | 956 | 463 | 493 |
| Kalamkhande | 859 | 441 | 418 |
| Kalanbhad (Bhondivale) | 1,025 | 493 | 532 |
| Kandali | 272 | 124 | 148 |
| Kanharle | 759 | 391 | 368 |
| Kanhol | 975 | 532 | 443 |
| Karavale | 1,089 | 577 | 512 |
| Karchonde | 647 | 332 | 315 |
| Kasgaon | 671 | 349 | 322 |
| Kedurli | 879 | 448 | 431 |
| Khandape | 888 | 457 | 431 |
| Khandare | 693 | 360 | 333 |
| Khanivare | 848 | 423 | 425 |
| Khapari | 1,084 | 554 | 530 |
| Kharshet Umbroli | 516 | 223 | 293 |
| Khateghar | 707 | 347 | 360 |
| Khed | 415 | 210 | 205 |
| Khedale | 564 | 292 | 272 |
| Kheware | 685 | 334 | 351 |
| Khopivali | 1,192 | 594 | 598 |
| Khutal Bangla | 568 | 285 | 283 |
| Khutal Baragaon | 1,562 | 865 | 697 |
| Khutarwadigaon (N.V.) | 365 | 188 | 177 |
| Kisal | 1,102 | 536 | 566 |
| Kishor | 971 | 517 | 454 |
| Kochare Bk. | 354 | 172 | 182 |
| Kochare Kh. | 155 | 83 | 72 |
| Kole | 195 | 105 | 90 |
| Koloshi | 716 | 362 | 354 |
| Kolthan | 960 | 482 | 478 |
| Kondesakhare | 640 | 324 | 316 |
| Korawale | 1,605 | 804 | 801 |
| Kudavali | 1,656 | 967 | 689 |
| Kudshet | 454 | 229 | 225 |
| Madh | 736 | 354 | 382 |
| Mahaj | 615 | 314 | 301 |
| Majgaon | 818 | 422 | 396 |
| Mal | 2,452 | 1,228 | 1,224 |
| Malegaon | 888 | 439 | 449 |
| Malhed | 972 | 499 | 473 |
| Malinagar (N.V.) | 968 | 527 | 441 |
| Mandus | 320 | 150 | 170 |
| Mandwat | 188 | 97 | 91 |
| Mangaon | 369 | 201 | 168 |
| Mangaon | 342 | 168 | 174 |
| Manivali Bk. | 1,177 | 590 | 587 |
| Manivali Kh. | 924 | 450 | 474 |
| Manivali Shirvali | 1,380 | 673 | 707 |
| Manivali Tarf Khedul | 442 | 232 | 210 |
| Masale | 1,688 | 824 | 864 |
| Merdi | 859 | 413 | 446 |
| Mharas | 729 | 375 | 354 |
| Mhase | 986 | 508 | 478 |
| Milhe | 882 | 450 | 432 |
| Mohaghar | 419 | 216 | 203 |
| Mohap | 401 | 198 | 203 |
| Moharai | 573 | 278 | 295 |
| Mohghar | 700 | 348 | 352 |
| Moroshi | 150 | 79 | 71 |
| Murbad | 15,821 | 8,592 | 7,229 |
| Nadhai | 974 | 482 | 492 |
| Nagaon | 1,386 | 706 | 680 |
| Nandeni | 421 | 205 | 216 |
| Nandgaon | 605 | 325 | 280 |
| Narayangaon | 394 | 197 | 197 |
| Narivali | 1,527 | 790 | 737 |
| Nevalpada | 898 | 450 | 448 |
| Nhave | 799 | 442 | 357 |
| Nyahadi | 655 | 339 | 316 |
| Ojiwale | 324 | 170 | 154 |
| Padale | 540 | 260 | 280 |
| Palu | 543 | 264 | 279 |
| Panshet (N.V.) | 371 | 168 | 203 |
| Pargaon | 467 | 236 | 231 |
| Parhe | 622 | 313 | 309 |
| Paronde (N.V.) | 346 | 177 | 169 |
| Pasheni | 173 | 86 | 87 |
| Patgaon | 540 | 259 | 281 |
| Pawale | 763 | 376 | 387 |
| Pendhari | 268 | 143 | 125 |
| Pimpalgaon | 819 | 428 | 391 |
| Pimpalghar | 216 | 105 | 111 |
| Potgaon | 797 | 406 | 391 |
| Rampur | 889 | 443 | 446 |
| Ranjangaon | 761 | 385 | 376 |
| Rao | 405 | 208 | 197 |
| Sajai | 1,284 | 661 | 623 |
| Sajgaon | 218 | 109 | 109 |
| Sakhare | 477 | 239 | 238 |
| Sakurli | 573 | 301 | 272 |
| Sangam | 657 | 360 | 297 |
| Saralgaon | 1,331 | 728 | 603 |
| Sasane | 1,085 | 548 | 537 |
| Sawarne | 387 | 199 | 188 |
| Sayale | 757 | 382 | 375 |
| Shai | 629 | 308 | 321 |
| Shastrinagar | 1,371 | 699 | 672 |
| Shedali | 674 | 345 | 329 |
| Shelgaon | 553 | 269 | 284 |
| Shidgaon (N.V.) | 420 | 206 | 214 |
| Shiravali | 1,666 | 841 | 825 |
| Shirgaon | 1,065 | 522 | 543 |
| Shiroshi | 1,132 | 567 | 565 |
| Shirpur | 438 | 219 | 219 |
| Shivale | 2,063 | 1,089 | 974 |
| Sidhgad | 207 | 114 | 93 |
| Singapur | 847 | 416 | 431 |
| Sonavale | 1,144 | 545 | 599 |
| Songaon | 484 | 250 | 234 |
| Talegaon | 1,325 | 678 | 647 |
| Talekhal | 416 | 204 | 212 |
| Talvali Bargaon | 1,351 | 775 | 576 |
| Talwali Tarf Ghorad | 951 | 474 | 477 |
| Tembhare Bk. | 726 | 370 | 356 |
| Temgaon | 305 | 136 | 169 |
| Thakare Nagar (N.V.) | 897 | 450 | 447 |
| Thitabi Tarf Vaishakhare | 147 | 65 | 82 |
| Thune | 598 | 298 | 300 |
| Tokawade | 1,115 | 608 | 507 |
| Tondali | 805 | 424 | 381 |
| Tulai | 1,020 | 511 | 509 |
| Uchale | 727 | 360 | 367 |
| Udaldon | 59 | 29 | 30 |
| Umaroli Bk. | 853 | 428 | 425 |
| Umbarpada | 1,948 | 997 | 951 |
| Umbroli Kh. | 835 | 429 | 406 |
| Vadgaon | 502 | 262 | 240 |
| Vaishakhare | 1,545 | 805 | 740 |
| Vehare | 426 | 211 | 215 |
| Veluk | 1,236 | 576 | 660 |
| Vidhe | 1,001 | 514 | 487 |
| Vidhyanagar | 279 | 138 | 141 |
| Wadu | 86 | 43 | 43 |
| Wadvali | 1,569 | 811 | 758 |
| Waghgaon (N.V.) | 550 | 279 | 271 |
| Waghivali | 1,240 | 624 | 616 |
| Walhivale | 992 | 481 | 511 |
| Wanjale | 845 | 411 | 434 |
| Wanote | 146 | 76 | 70 |
| Zadghar | 1,245 | 639 | 606 |
| Total | 170,267 | 87,163 | 83,104 |

=== Shahapur ===
Shahapur taluka
| Town/Village Name | Population | Males | Females |
|---|---|---|---|
| Adivali | 539 | 265 | 274 |
| Aghai | 2,731 | 1,829 | 902 |
| Ajnup | 2,971 | 1,437 | 1,534 |
| Alyani | 1,408 | 711 | 697 |
| Ambarje | 1,667 | 851 | 816 |
| Ambekhor | 912 | 437 | 475 |
| Ambivali | 1,166 | 555 | 611 |
| Ambivali | 392 | 184 | 208 |
| Andad | 866 | 431 | 435 |
| Apate | 1,555 | 797 | 758 |
| Arjunali | 529 | 265 | 264 |
| Asangaon | 7,557 | 4,063 | 3,494 |
| Ashte | 437 | 206 | 231 |
| Asnoli | 3,053 | 1,545 | 1,508 |
| Atgaon | 5 | 1,476 | 1,219 |
| Awale | 1,171 | 572 | 599 |
| Aware | 1,171 | 599 | 572 |
| Babare | 271 | 133 | 138 |
| Babhale | 651 | 319 | 332 |
| Balwandi | 510 | 256 | 254 |
| Bamane | 766 | 457 | 309 |
| Bavghar | 514 | 247 | 267 |
| Bedisgaon | 755 | 384 | 371 |
| Belwad | 987 | 493 | 494 |
| Belwali | 565 | 270 | 295 |
| Bendekon | 287 | 152 | 135 |
| Bhagdal | 317 | 162 | 155 |
| Bhakari | 52 | 24 | 28 |
| Bhatsai | 1,467 | 868 | 599 |
| Bhavse | 1,001 | 488 | 513 |
| Bhinar | 182 | 89 | 93 |
| Birwadi | 4,308 | 2,249 | 2,059 |
| Borsheti Bk. | 687 | 357 | 330 |
| Borsheti Kh | 638 | 324 | 314 |
| Chande | 232 | 105 | 127 |
| Chandgaon (N.V.) | 1,418 | 723 | 695 |
| Chandroti | 854 | 424 | 430 |
| Chariv | 1,107 | 547 | 560 |
| Cherpoli | 2,545 | 1,363 | 1,182 |
| Cherwali | 868 | 467 | 401 |
| Chikhalgaon | 1,669 | 846 | 823 |
| Chilhar | 529 | 258 | 271 |
| Chinchvali | 335 | 157 | 178 |
| Chondhe Bk. | 2,739 | 1,703 | 1,036 |
| Chondhe Kh. | 302 | 149 | 153 |
| Dahagaon | 1,089 | 549 | 540 |
| Dahigaon | 1,798 | 899 | 899 |
| Dahivali | 1,147 | 580 | 567 |
| Dahivali Tarf Korkada | 114 | 60 | 54 |
| Dalkhan | 1,551 | 764 | 787 |
| Dand | 181 | 96 | 85 |
| Dapur | 545 | 258 | 287 |
| Dehene | 751 | 363 | 388 |
| Devgaon (N.V.) | 448 | 230 | 218 |
| Dhadhare | 1,576 | 755 | 821 |
| Dhakane | 1,253 | 632 | 621 |
| Dhamani | 642 | 330 | 312 |
| Dhasai | 1,993 | 1,008 | 985 |
| Dimbhe | 268 | 137 | 131 |
| Dolkhamb | 2,026 | 1,145 | 881 |
| Dughar | 54 | 31 | 23 |
| Fugale | 1,040 | 546 | 494 |
| Gandulwad | 683 | 331 | 352 |
| Gegaon | 1,154 | 600 | 554 |
| Ghanepada | 268 | 126 | 142 |
| Gokulgaon (N.V.) | 479 | 238 | 241 |
| Golbhan | 431 | 222 | 209 |
| Gotheghar | 4,096 | 2,124 | 1,972 |
| Gunde | 983 | 485 | 498 |
| Hal | 349 | 173 | 176 |
| Hedvali | 607 | 306 | 301 |
| Hinglud | 388 | 183 | 205 |
| Hiv | 1,156 | 573 | 583 |
| Jambhe | 696 | 342 | 354 |
| Jambhulwad | 498 | 240 | 258 |
| Jarandi | 627 | 320 | 307 |
| Julawani | 1,261 | 648 | 613 |
| Kalambhe | 3,117 | 1,474 | 1,643 |
| Kalamgaon | 1,237 | 678 | 559 |
| Kalbhonde | 845 | 407 | 438 |
| Kalgaon | 911 | 443 | 468 |
| Kambare | 1,048 | 533 | 515 |
| Kambe | 451 | 222 | 229 |
| Kanadi | 827 | 423 | 404 |
| Kanawe | 793 | 402 | 391 |
| Kanvinde | 652 | 320 | 332 |
| Karade | 162 | 91 | 71 |
| Kasagaon | 701 | 357 | 344 |
| Kasara Kh. | 2,371 | 1,283 | 1,088 |
| Kashti | 289 | 157 | 132 |
| Katbao | 189 | 94 | 95 |
| Kawadas | 759 | 393 | 366 |
| Khaire | 660 | 328 | 332 |
| Kharade | 1,181 | 604 | 577 |
| Kharangan | 681 | 303 | 378 |
| Khardi | 4,707 | 2,484 | 2,223 |
| Kharid | 965 | 471 | 494 |
| Kharivali | 1,269 | 646 | 623 |
| Kharivali | 954 | 485 | 469 |
| Khativali | 2,469 | 1,288 | 1,181 |
| Khor | 185 | 86 | 99 |
| Khoste | 354 | 171 | 183 |
| Khutadi | 325 | 186 | 139 |
| Khutghar | 1,045 | 526 | 519 |
| Kinhavali | 3,483 | 1,810 | 1,673 |
| Koshimbade | 655 | 334 | 321 |
| Kothale | 1,067 | 519 | 548 |
| Kothare | 1,846 | 940 | 906 |
| Kudshet | 567 | 290 | 277 |
| Kukambhe | 538 | 274 | 264 |
| Kulhe | 804 | 247 | 557 |
| Lahe | 1,471 | 774 | 697 |
| Lavale | 845 | 404 | 441 |
| Lenad Bk. | 791 | 409 | 382 |
| Lenad Kh. | 723 | 371 | 352 |
| Lingayate | 598 | 301 | 297 |
| Madh | 787 | 420 | 367 |
| Mahuli | 239 | 122 | 117 |
| Mal | 1,385 | 692 | 693 |
| Malad | 373 | 191 | 182 |
| Malegaon | 671 | 320 | 351 |
| Mamnoli | 546 | 250 | 296 |
| Manekhind | 603 | 309 | 294 |
| Mangaon (N.V.) | 969 | 476 | 493 |
| Mangaon (N.V.) | 470 | 238 | 232 |
| Manjare | 888 | 452 | 436 |
| Masavane | 697 | 350 | 347 |
| Mohili | 409 | 202 | 207 |
| Mokhavane | 1,819 | 933 | 886 |
| Mugaon | 1,853 | 907 | 946 |
| Musai | 1,312 | 668 | 644 |
| Nadgaon | 425 | 221 | 204 |
| Nadgaon (Lonad) | 2,827 | 1,423 | 1,404 |
| Nandgaon | 805 | 400 | 405 |
| Nandgaon (So) | 499 | 258 | 241 |
| Nandval | 1,280 | 644 | 636 |
| Narayangaon | 1,359 | 671 | 688 |
| Nehroli | 792 | 417 | 375 |
| Nevare | 607 | 303 | 304 |
| Palheri | 628 | 302 | 326 |
| Pali | 714 | 371 | 343 |
| Palshin | 739 | 373 | 366 |
| Palsoli | 90 | 42 | 48 |
| Panchghar | 815 | 378 | 437 |
| Partoli | 430 | 211 | 219 |
| Pashane | 669 | 359 | 310 |
| Patol | 1,081 | 554 | 527 |
| Pendharghol (N.V.) | 932 | 602 | 330 |
| Pendhari | 575 | 288 | 287 |
| Pimpalpada | 365 | 193 | 172 |
| Pingalwadi | 224 | 115 | 109 |
| Piwali | 726 | 363 | 363 |
| Pofodi | 374 | 191 | 183 |
| Pundhe | 848 | 497 | 351 |
| Ranvihir | 1,310 | 661 | 649 |
| Ras | 272 | 129 | 143 |
| Ratandhale | 419 | 207 | 212 |
| Roadvahal | 391 | 196 | 195 |
| Sajivali | 956 | 498 | 458 |
| Sakadbav | 1,288 | 611 | 677 |
| Sakharoli | 1,001 | 494 | 507 |
| Sakurli | 1,554 | 785 | 769 |
| Sane | 603 | 319 | 284 |
| Sapagaon | 2,349 | 1,234 | 1,115 |
| Saralambe | 1,836 | 916 | 920 |
| Sarangpuri | 1,337 | 679 | 658 |
| Sarmal | 1,196 | 664 | 532 |
| Satgaon | 1,368 | 697 | 671 |
| Savaroli (So) | 1,858 | 935 | 923 |
| Savaroli Bk. | 1,227 | 622 | 605 |
| Savaroli Kh. | 335 | 177 | 158 |
| Shahapur | 41,563 | 21,668 | 19,895 |
| Sheel | 835 | 409 | 426 |
| Shei | 1,025 | 520 | 505 |
| Shelwali (Bangar) | 1,197 | 614 | 583 |
| Shelwali (Khadabachi) | 969 | 500 | 469 |
| Shenawe | 1,638 | 849 | 789 |
| Shende | 826 | 403 | 423 |
| Shendrun | 516 | 256 | 260 |
| Shendrun Bk. | 701 | 361 | 340 |
| Shere | 1,844 | 932 | 912 |
| Shilottar | 812 | 398 | 414 |
| Shirgaon | 1,142 | 588 | 554 |
| Shirol | 4,776 | 2,472 | 2,304 |
| Shirvanje | 405 | 209 | 196 |
| Shivajinagar | 643 | 327 | 316 |
| Shivaneri | 1,080 | 568 | 512 |
| Sogaon | 1,339 | 650 | 689 |
| Susarwadi | 865 | 471 | 394 |
| Taharpur | 556 | 286 | 270 |
| Talwade | 849 | 421 | 428 |
| Tanasa | 1,554 | 760 | 794 |
| Tembhare | 313 | 155 | 158 |
| Tembhare Bk. | 1,075 | 557 | 518 |
| Tembhe | 1,772 | 864 | 908 |
| Tembhurli | 583 | 287 | 296 |
| Thile | 721 | 363 | 358 |
| Thune | 865 | 436 | 429 |
| Thune Bk. | 1,009 | 518 | 491 |
| Tute | 422 | 210 | 212 |
| Umbarkhand | 559 | 295 | 264 |
| Umbhrai | 1,253 | 618 | 635 |
| Umbravane | 265 | 121 | 144 |
| Vachkole | 545 | 287 | 258 |
| Vafe | 2,844 | 1,548 | 1,296 |
| Vaghivali | 265 | 137 | 128 |
| Valmiknagar (N.V.) | 534 | 256 | 278 |
| Valshet | 756 | 388 | 368 |
| Vandre | 926 | 554 | 372 |
| Varaskol | 539 | 288 | 251 |
| Vasind | 25000(More) | - | - |
| Vashala Bk | 1,332 | 692 | 640 |
| Vashala Kh | 275 | 139 | 136 |
| Vaveghar | 104 | 49 | 55 |
| Vedvahal | 467 | 225 | 242 |
| Vehloli | 1,671 | 864 | 807 |
| Vehloli Kh. | 471 | 231 | 240 |
| Vehloli Bk. | 2,425 | 1,223 | 1,202 |
| Vehlonde | 538 | 258 | 280 |
| Veluk | 1,238 | 621 | 617 |
| Vihigaon | 1,726 | 885 | 841 |
| Vithobachegaon | 1,100 | 557 | 543 |
| Vittalgaon (N.V.) | 751 | 350 | 401 |
| Walshet | 637 | 320 | 317 |
| Total | 273,304 | 140,547 | 132,757 |

=== Thane ===
Thane taluka
| Town/Village Name | Population | Males | Females |
|---|---|---|---|
| Kharegaon Chendani Vitawa | NA | NA | NA |
| Total | NA | | |

=== Ulhasnagar ===
Ulhasnagar taluka
| Town/Village Name | Population | Males | Females |
| Total | 473,731 | 251,888 | |

== Palghar District ==
=== Dahanu ===
Dahanu taluka
| Town/Village Name | Population | Males | Females |
|---|---|---|---|
| Agwan | 3,476 | 1,769 | 1,707 |
| Aine | 1,055 | 540 | 515 |
| Alkapur | 748 | 360 | 388 |
| Ambesari | 4,313 | 2,150 | 2,163 |
| Ambewadi | 892 | 460 | 432 |
| Ambiste | 620 | 277 | 343 |
| Ambistewadi | 731 | 347 | 384 |
| Ambivali | 762 | 370 | 392 |
| Ambivali Tarf Bahare | 1,630 | 846 | 784 |
| Asangaon | 1,399 | 684 | 715 |
| Asangaon Bk. | 1,435 | 725 | 710 |
| Asave | 2,302 | 1,331 | 971 |
| Ashagad | 3,335 | 1,681 | 1,654 |
| Ashte | 933 | 449 | 484 |
| Aswali | 2,075 | 1,098 | 977 |
| Awadhani | 740 | 351 | 389 |
| Bade Pokharan | 1,509 | 744 | 765 |
| Bahare | 1,531 | 733 | 798 |
| Bandhghar | 924 | 453 | 471 |
| Bapugaon | 1,523 | 851 | 672 |
| Bavade | 1,566 | 774 | 792 |
| Bendgaon | 644 | 291 | 353 |
| Bharad | 1,119 | 517 | 602 |
| Bhisenagar | 2,216 | 1,122 | 1,094 |
| Bodgaon | 494 | 253 | 241 |
| Bordi | 6,900 | 3,728 | 3,172 |
| Bramhanwadi | 544 | 269 | 275 |
| Chalani | 2,030 | 965 | 1,065 |
| Chandigaon | 1,330 | 616 | 714 |
| Chandranagar | 1,571 | 797 | 774 |
| Chandwad | 1,664 | 792 | 872 |
| Chari Tarf Jamshet | 335 | 158 | 177 |
| Chari Tarf Kotebi | 1,864 | 923 | 941 |
| Charoti | 3,610 | 1,952 | 1,658 |
| Chikhale | 3,670 | 1,852 | 1,818 |
| Chimbave | 745 | 371 | 374 |
| Chinchale | 1,452 | 733 | 719 |
| Dabhadi | 2,367 | 1,157 | 1,210 |
| Dabhale | 1,073 | 538 | 535 |
| Dabhon | 3,229 | 1,635 | 1,594 |
| Dahanu | 57,838 | 29,729 | 28,109 |
| Dahigaon | 626 | 302 | 324 |
| Dahyale | 1,249 | 639 | 610 |
| Dapchari | 3,447 | 1,762 | 1,685 |
| Dedale | 1,218 | 642 | 576 |
| Dehane | 2,797 | 1,380 | 1,417 |
| Deur | 585 | 270 | 315 |
| Devgaon | 927 | 456 | 471 |
| Dhakti Dahanu | 4,812 | 2,392 | 2,420 |
| Dhamanagaon | 2,912 | 1,457 | 1,455 |
| Dhamatane | 1,040 | 484 | 556 |
| Dhaniwari | 755 | 334 | 421 |
| Dharampur | 1,509 | 742 | 767 |
| Dhumket | 1,937 | 937 | 1,000 |
| Dhundalwadi | 1,569 | 832 | 737 |
| Diwashi | 1,342 | 655 | 687 |
| Gadchinchale | 1,152 | 530 | 622 |
| Ganeshbag | 643 | 310 | 333 |
| Gangangaon | 2,417 | 1,121 | 1,296 |
| Gangodi | 995 | 456 | 539 |
| Ganjad | 1,659 | 858 | 801 |
| Gaurwadi | 1,307 | 619 | 688 |
| Ghadane | 862 | 402 | 460 |
| Ghol | 1,386 | 720 | 666 |
| Gholwad | 4,327 | 2,183 | 2,144 |
| Gowane | 1,736 | 874 | 862 |
| Gungavada | 1,069 | 524 | 545 |
| Halapada | 1,940 | 969 | 971 |
| Jalwai | 1,141 | 581 | 560 |
| Jambugaon | 6,396 | 3,060 | 3,336 |
| Jamshet | 1,433 | 675 | 758 |
| Jingaon | 1,051 | 495 | 556 |
| Junnarpada | 2,862 | 1,385 | 1,477 |
| Kainad | 5,390 | 2,653 | 2,737 |
| Kalamdevi | 1,258 | 659 | 599 |
| Kandarwadi | 1,432 | 681 | 751 |
| Kankradi | 1,519 | 771 | 748 |
| Kapshi | 1,153 | 588 | 565 |
| Karanjvira | 972 | 475 | 497 |
| Kasa Kh. | 2,603 | 1,346 | 1,257 |
| Kasara | 1,733 | 847 | 886 |
| Khambale | 1,009 | 557 | 452 |
| Khaniv | 1,062 | 503 | 559 |
| Khubale | 524 | 250 | 274 |
| Khunavade | 2,053 | 1,009 | 1,044 |
| Kinhawali | 1,847 | 953 | 894 |
| Kolavali | 1,784 | 893 | 891 |
| Kolhan | 479 | 235 | 244 |
| Komgaon | 1,478 | 668 | 810 |
| Kosbad | 3,357 | 1,606 | 1,751 |
| Kotabi | 1,439 | 723 | 716 |
| Lashkari | 818 | 399 | 419 |
| Manipur | 1,242 | 593 | 649 |
| Mhasad | 670 | 367 | 303 |
| Modgaon | 3,985 | 1,870 | 2,115 |
| Motapada | 954 | 484 | 470 |
| Motgaon | 1,114 | 553 | 561 |
| Nagzari | 2,701 | 1,396 | 1,305 |
| Nandare | 506 | 254 | 252 |
| Naraliwadi | 1,213 | 591 | 622 |
| Narpad | 2,892 | 1,464 | 1,428 |
| Naruli | 1,087 | 530 | 557 |
| Navnath | 1,414 | 696 | 718 |
| Nikane | 1,288 | 621 | 667 |
| Nikavali | 427 | 228 | 199 |
| Nimbapur | 1,401 | 688 | 713 |
| Osarvira | 1,339 | 607 | 732 |
| Osarwadi | 958 | 480 | 478 |
| Pale | 2,376 | 1,169 | 1,207 |
| Pandhartaragaon | 1,046 | 515 | 531 |
| Paraswadi | 1,014 | 486 | 528 |
| Pardi | 408 | 244 | 164 |
| Patilpada | 2,416 | 1,194 | 1,222 |
| Patilpada | 931 | 427 | 504 |
| Pavan | 859 | 394 | 465 |
| Peth | 618 | 317 | 301 |
| Phanaswadi | 712 | 335 | 377 |
| Pimpalshet Kh. | 395 | 195 | 200 |
| Pokharan | 687 | 322 | 365 |
| Punjave | 315 | 161 | 154 |
| Raipada | 1,831 | 912 | 919 |
| Raipur | 2,210 | 1,079 | 1,131 |
| Raitali | 1,093 | 525 | 568 |
| Rampur | 4,150 | 2,049 | 2,101 |
| Rampur | 519 | 243 | 276 |
| Rankol | 2,625 | 1,329 | 1,296 |
| Ranshet | 1,765 | 901 | 864 |
| Saiwan | 1,910 | 972 | 938 |
| Sakhare | 2,500 | 1,278 | 1,222 |
| Sarani | 1,422 | 710 | 712 |
| Saravali | 4,821 | 2,396 | 2,425 |
| Sasvand | 220 | 94 | 126 |
| Sawata | 1,569 | 772 | 797 |
| Saye | 852 | 402 | 450 |
| Shelti | 227 | 116 | 111 |
| Shensari | 1,548 | 758 | 790 |
| Shilonde | 765 | 354 | 411 |
| Shisne | 1,798 | 822 | 976 |
| Sogwe | 1,986 | 969 | 1,017 |
| Somanath | 1,073 | 546 | 527 |
| Sonale | 744 | 357 | 387 |
| Sukad-amba | 1,317 | 634 | 683 |
| Suryanagar | 1,347 | 740 | 607 |
| Tadiyale | 958 | 494 | 464 |
| Talothe | 574 | 278 | 296 |
| Tanashi | 928 | 460 | 468 |
| Tawa | 1,649 | 922 | 727 |
| Thakurwadi | 853 | 445 | 408 |
| Tornipada | 687 | 336 | 351 |
| Urse | 962 | 493 | 469 |
| Vadade | 448 | 215 | 233 |
| Vadhane | 1,095 | 544 | 551 |
| Vaghadi | 1,417 | 708 | 709 |
| Vanai | 2,646 | 1,282 | 1,364 |
| Vandhavan | 1,697 | 838 | 859 |
| Vangaon | 6,454 | 3,476 | 2,978 |
| Vankas | 3,000 | 1,485 | 1,515 |
| Varkhande | 1,221 | 662 | 559 |
| Varor | 2,721 | 1,366 | 1,355 |
| Varoti | 1,126 | 570 | 556 |
| Vasantwadi | 1,749 | 856 | 893 |
| Vasgaon | 1,923 | 954 | 969 |
| Vikasnagar | 1,794 | 898 | 896 |
| Vire | 466 | 231 | 235 |
| Vivalvedhe | 1,481 | 722 | 759 |
| Vyahali | 508 | 264 | 244 |
| Waki | 1,892 | 962 | 930 |
| Zarali | 1,115 | 557 | 558 |
| Total | 331,829 | 166,410 | 165,419 |

=== Jawhar ===
Jawhar taluka
| Town/Village Name | Population | Males | Females |
|---|---|---|---|
| Adkhadak | 342 | 187 | 155 |
| Aine | 513 | 251 | 262 |
| Akare | 1,434 | 691 | 743 |
| Akhar | 705 | 330 | 375 |
| Alyachimet | 345 | 173 | 172 |
| Anantnagar (N.V.) | 742 | 385 | 357 |
| Aptale | 1,225 | 587 | 638 |
| Ayare | 1,132 | 560 | 572 |
| Barawadpada | 618 | 283 | 335 |
| Behadgaon (N.V.) | 1,227 | 597 | 630 |
| Bhagada (N.V.) | 430 | 207 | 223 |
| Bharasatmet | 464 | 223 | 241 |
| Bhuritek | 703 | 347 | 356 |
| Bopdari | 1,083 | 514 | 569 |
| Borale | 1,392 | 702 | 690 |
| Chambharshet | 1,674 | 829 | 845 |
| Chandgaon (N.V.) | 528 | 261 | 267 |
| Chandranagar (N.V.) | 246 | 119 | 127 |
| Chandrapur (N.V.) | 340 | 174 | 166 |
| Chauk | 1,152 | 575 | 577 |
| Dabheri | 1,825 | 938 | 887 |
| Dabhlon | 1,202 | 561 | 641 |
| Dabhose | 1,466 | 734 | 732 |
| Dadar Koprapada | 454 | 225 | 229 |
| Dadhari | 446 | 232 | 214 |
| Dahul | 216 | 111 | 105 |
| Daskod | 372 | 181 | 191 |
| Dehare | 1,666 | 901 | 765 |
| Dengachimet | 1,225 | 592 | 633 |
| Devgaon | 1,315 | 662 | 653 |
| Dhanoshi | 924 | 453 | 471 |
| Dharampur | 1,174 | 546 | 628 |
| Dongarwadi | 698 | 353 | 345 |
| Ganeshnagar (N.V.) | 1,005 | 505 | 500 |
| Gangapur (N.V.) | 172 | 78 | 94 |
| Garadwadi | 686 | 327 | 359 |
| Ghiwande | 1,649 | 805 | 844 |
| Gorthan | 778 | 394 | 384 |
| Hade | 818 | 419 | 399 |
| Hateri | 990 | 474 | 516 |
| Hiradpada | 1,487 | 756 | 731 |
| Jambhulmaya (N.V.) | 560 | 279 | 281 |
| Jamsar | 1,461 | 730 | 731 |
| Jawhar | 11,298 | 5,977 | 5,321 |
| Jayeshwar (N.V.) | 532 | 274 | 258 |
| Juni Jawhar | 1,460 | 704 | 756 |
| Kadachimet | 577 | 280 | 297 |
| Kalamvihira | 352 | 164 | 188 |
| Kardhan | 272 | 140 | 132 |
| Kasatwadi | 752 | 380 | 372 |
| Kashivali Tarf Dengachimet | 740 | 344 | 396 |
| Kaulale | 1,496 | 724 | 772 |
| Kayari | 725 | 347 | 378 |
| Kelghar | 1,029 | 499 | 530 |
| Khadkhad | 654 | 330 | 324 |
| Khambale | 1,198 | 672 | 526 |
| Kharonda | 1,891 | 937 | 954 |
| Khidse | 344 | 166 | 178 |
| Kirmire | 995 | 482 | 513 |
| Kogade | 613 | 310 | 303 |
| Kortad | 977 | 493 | 484 |
| Kuturvihir | 367 | 183 | 184 |
| Malghar | 664 | 325 | 339 |
| Manmohadi | 237 | 109 | 128 |
| Medha | 1,160 | 576 | 584 |
| Medhe | 245 | 115 | 130 |
| Morchachapada | 259 | 120 | 139 |
| Nandgaon | 1,757 | 935 | 822 |
| Nandnmal | 407 | 202 | 205 |
| Nyahale Bk. | 1,582 | 806 | 776 |
| Nyahale Kh | 2,000 | 1,051 | 949 |
| Ozar | 1,439 | 683 | 756 |
| Palshin | 181 | 93 | 88 |
| Pathardi | 1,369 | 685 | 684 |
| Pimpalgaon | 1,756 | 876 | 880 |
| Pimpalshet | 1,287 | 651 | 636 |
| Pimprun | 346 | 165 | 181 |
| Poyshet | 772 | 358 | 414 |
| Radhanagari (N.V.) | 330 | 156 | 174 |
| Raitale | 2,431 | 1,246 | 1,185 |
| Rajewadi | 987 | 473 | 514 |
| Ramnagar (N.V.) | 412 | 198 | 214 |
| Ramnagar (N.V.) | 391 | 201 | 190 |
| Rampur (N.V.) | 480 | 237 | 243 |
| Ruighar | 564 | 266 | 298 |
| Sakharshet | 1,852 | 926 | 926 |
| Sakur | 1,219 | 414 | 805 |
| Sarsun | 2,200 | 1,057 | 1,143 |
| Savarpada | 732 | 375 | 357 |
| Shirasgaon (N.V.) | 426 | 210 | 216 |
| Shiroshi | 807 | 387 | 420 |
| Shivaji Nagar | 912 | 455 | 457 |
| Shivajinagar (N.V.) | 338 | 162 | 176 |
| Shrirampur | 1,307 | 647 | 660 |
| Shrirampur (N.V.) | 419 | 208 | 211 |
| Suryanagar (N.V.) | 503 | 246 | 257 |
| Suryanagar (N.V.) | 425 | 203 | 222 |
| Talasari | 903 | 434 | 469 |
| Tilonde | 1,337 | 632 | 705 |
| Tuljapur (N.V.) | 400 | 188 | 212 |
| Umbarkheda | 670 | 332 | 338 |
| Vangani | 1,021 | 537 | 484 |
| Vavar | 1,833 | 959 | 874 |
| Vijaynagar (N.V.) | 1,077 | 514 | 563 |
| Wadoli | 975 | 472 | 503 |
| Walwande | 1,427 | 696 | 731 |
| Winwal | 2,127 | 1,140 | 987 |
| Zap | 1,917 | 1,089 | 828 |
| Total | 111,039 | 55,467 | 55,572 |

=== Mokhada ===
Mokhada taluka
| Town/Village Name | Population | Males | Females |
|---|---|---|---|
| Aadoshi | 923 | 491 | 432 |
| Aamale | 193 | 98 | 95 |
| Aase | 2,513 | 1,270 | 1,243 |
| Beriste | 1,403 | 705 | 698 |
| Botoshi | 903 | 436 | 467 |
| Brahmagaon | 679 | 321 | 358 |
| Charangaon (N.V.) | 228 | 114 | 114 |
| Chas | 2,332 | 1,177 | 1,155 |
| Dandwal | 625 | 307 | 318 |
| Dhamani | 603 | 294 | 309 |
| Dhamanshet | 1,241 | 632 | 609 |
| Dhondmaryachi met | 304 | 146 | 158 |
| Dhudgaon (N.V.) | 474 | 237 | 237 |
| Dolhare | 1,141 | 577 | 564 |
| Ghanval | 1,188 | 581 | 607 |
| Ghosali | 973 | 476 | 497 |
| Gomghar | 1,228 | 605 | 623 |
| Gonde Bk. | 2,314 | 1,152 | 1,162 |
| Gonde Kh. | 788 | 440 | 348 |
| Hirve | 1,761 | 943 | 818 |
| Jogalwadi | 812 | 410 | 402 |
| Kaduchiwadi | 618 | 305 | 313 |
| Kalamgaon | 472 | 219 | 253 |
| Karegaon | 1,196 | 677 | 519 |
| Karol | 690 | 355 | 335 |
| Kashti | 461 | 217 | 244 |
| Kevanale | 659 | 343 | 316 |
| Khoch | 1,454 | 755 | 699 |
| Khodala | 2,807 | 1,518 | 1,289 |
| Kiniste | 939 | 478 | 461 |
| Kochale | 609 | 306 | 303 |
| Koshimshet | 1,677 | 856 | 821 |
| Kurlod | 1,040 | 519 | 521 |
| Lakshiminagar (N.V.) | 404 | 198 | 206 |
| Mokhada | 7,789 | 3,999 | 3,790 |
| Morhande | 2,007 | 997 | 1,010 |
| Nashera | 733 | 363 | 370 |
| Nilmati (N.V.) | 352 | 160 | 192 |
| Osarvira | 760 | 361 | 399 |
| Pachaghar | 512 | 261 | 251 |
| Palsunde | 1,365 | 738 | 627 |
| Pathardi | 661 | 323 | 338 |
| Pimpalgaon | 824 | 417 | 407 |
| Poshera | 3,183 | 1,559 | 1,624 |
| Rajivnagar (N.V.) | 565 | 277 | 288 |
| Sakhari | 1,279 | 635 | 644 |
| Saturly | 1,443 | 726 | 717 |
| Sawarde | 525 | 264 | 261 |
| Sayade | 1,770 | 902 | 868 |
| Shastrinagar (N.V.) | 519 | 252 | 267 |
| Shirasgaon | 526 | 287 | 239 |
| Shirson (N.V.) | 331 | 161 | 170 |
| Shivali | 576 | 277 | 299 |
| Suryamal | 1,205 | 607 | 598 |
| Swaminagar (N.V.) | 1,499 | 713 | 786 |
| Udhale | 1,064 | 558 | 506 |
| Vashind | 291 | 141 | 150 |
| Wakadpada | 756 | 376 | 380 |
| Washala | 1,132 | 568 | 564 |
| Total | 67,319 | 34,080 | 33,239 |

=== Palghar ===
Palghar taluka
| Town/Village Name | Population | Males | Females |
|---|---|---|---|
| Agarwadi | 1,494 | 728 | 766 |
| Agawan | 1,251 | 651 | 600 |
| Akegavhan | 553 | 250 | 303 |
| Akkarpatti | 945 | 597 | 348 |
| Akoli | 532 | 231 | 301 |
| Alewadi | 923 | 474 | 449 |
| Allyali | 700 | 400 | 300 |
| Ambadi | 455 | 224 | 231 |
| Ambatpada | 832 | 418 | 414 |
| Ambedhe | 669 | 340 | 329 |
| Ambhan | 558 | 291 | 267 |
| Ambodegaon | 503 | 243 | 260 |
| Awadhan | 1,462 | 705 | 757 |
| Bahadoli | 1,453 | 753 | 700 |
| Bandar | 1,256 | 616 | 640 |
| Bandate | 532 | 261 | 271 |
| Bandhan | 471 | 236 | 235 |
| Barhanpur | 2,524 | 1,208 | 1,316 |
| Betegaon | 1,817 | 966 | 851 |
| Bhadave | 662 | 322 | 340 |
| Birwadi | 1,215 | 618 | 597 |
| Borsheti | 1,757 | 862 | 895 |
| Boisar | | | |
| Bot | 1,221 | 600 | 621 |
| Chahade | 2,017 | 1,032 | 985 |
| Chari Kh. | 400 | 191 | 209 |
| Chatale | 1,088 | 542 | 546 |
| Chilhar | 771 | 401 | 370 |
| Chinchare | 616 | 279 | 337 |
| Dahisar T. Mahim | 270 | 136 | 134 |
| Dahisar T. Manor | 1,948 | 985 | 963 |
| Dahisar T. Tarapur | 1,639 | 851 | 788 |
| Dahiwale | 568 | 286 | 282 |
| Damkhind | 638 | 322 | 316 |
| Dande | 779 | 390 | 389 |
| Dandi | 12,281 | 7,427 | 4,854 |
| Dandi | 6,151 | 3,142 | 3,009 |
| Dapoli | 856 | 473 | 383 |
| Darshet | 659 | 327 | 332 |
| Datiware | 1,489 | 745 | 744 |
| Devkhope | 1,606 | 816 | 790 |
| Dhansar | 1,831 | 949 | 882 |
| Dhekale | 1,110 | 597 | 513 |
| Dhuktan | 2,516 | 1,270 | 1,246 |
| Dongare | 861 | 424 | 437 |
| Durves | 3,009 | 1,513 | 1,496 |
| Edwan | 3,687 | 1,845 | 1,842 |
| Embur Airambi | 1,833 | 945 | 888 |
| Ganje | 1,517 | 769 | 748 |
| Gargaon | 560 | 277 | 283 |
| Ghatim | 582 | 290 | 292 |
| Ghivali | 2,493 | 1,322 | 1,171 |
| Girale | 880 | 444 | 436 |
| Girnoli | 1,536 | 772 | 764 |
| Gowade | 1,150 | 660 | 490 |
| Gundale | 2,056 | 1,035 | 1,021 |
| Gundali | 211 | 115 | 96 |
| Gundave | 560 | 290 | 270 |
| Haloli | 3,131 | 1,622 | 1,509 |
| Hanuman Nagar | 996 | 485 | 511 |
| Haranwali | 1,646 | 834 | 812 |
| Jalsar | 1,753 | 905 | 848 |
| Jansai | 152 | 80 | 72 |
| Jayshet | 604 | 297 | 307 |
| Kallale | 742 | 370 | 372 |
| Kamare | 1,269 | 640 | 629 |
| Kambalgaon | 52 | 26 | 26 |
| Kambode | 752 | 397 | 355 |
| Kandarwan | 411 | 233 | 178 |
| Kandre Bhure | 998 | 501 | 497 |
| Kapase | 1,477 | 744 | 733 |
| Karalgaon | 1,047 | 504 | 543 |
| Kardal | 1,375 | 696 | 679 |
| Karwale | 1,204 | 612 | 592 |
| Katale | 1,145 | 604 | 541 |
| Kelwa | 6,196 | 3,119 | 3,077 |
| Kelwa Road | 4,530 | 2,281 | 2,249 |
| Khadkawane | 263 | 131 | 132 |
| Khadkoli | 1,987 | 1,080 | 907 |
| Khaira | 22,842 | 14,060 | 8,782 |
| Khaire | 268 | 139 | 129 |
| Khamloli | 1,446 | 709 | 737 |
| Khanivade | 820 | 394 | 426 |
| Khardi | 2,117 | 1,060 | 1,057 |
| Kharekuran | 2,241 | 1,120 | 1,121 |
| Kharshet | 496 | 253 | 243 |
| Khatali | 87 | 37 | 50 |
| Khutad | 835 | 463 | 372 |
| Khutal | 216 | 111 | 105 |
| Kirat | 1,983 | 983 | 1,000 |
| Kokaner | 1,082 | 559 | 523 |
| Kolawade | 3,867 | 2,786 | 1,081 |
| Kolgaon | 1,635 | 910 | 725 |
| Kondhan | 1,160 | 566 | 594 |
| Kore | 1,645 | 823 | 822 |
| Kosbad | 1,310 | 641 | 669 |
| Kudan | 2,311 | 1,177 | 1,134 |
| Kude | 918 | 483 | 435 |
| Kukade | 1,090 | 553 | 537 |
| Kumbhavali | 2,083 | 1,232 | 851 |
| Kurgaon | 3,070 | 1,745 | 1,325 |
| Lalonde | 1,472 | 831 | 641 |
| Lalthane | 1,078 | 600 | 478 |
| Loware | 887 | 442 | 445 |
| Mahagaon | 1,627 | 802 | 825 |
| Mahim | 9,647 | 4,892 | 4,755 |
| Makane Kapase | 1,764 | 914 | 850 |
| Makunsar | 2,673 | 1,385 | 1,288 |
| Man | 1,665 | 880 | 785 |
| Mande | 1,050 | 529 | 521 |
| Mangelwada | 1,338 | 644 | 694 |
| Manjurli | 90 | 48 | 42 |
| Manor | | | |
| Maswan | 1,513 | 803 | 710 |
| Mathane | 739 | 367 | 372 |
| Mendhwan | 755 | 437 | 318 |
| Mithagar | 1,316 | 689 | 627 |
| Morekuran | 703 | 370 | 333 |
| Mundwali | 783 | 400 | 383 |
| Murabe | 7,314 | 3,737 | 3,577 |
| Mykhop | 2,014 | 1,048 | 966 |
| Nagave | 569 | 292 | 277 |
| Nagave T.Manor | 209 | 104 | 105 |
| Nagavepada | 543 | 269 | 274 |
| Nagzari | 1,581 | 845 | 736 |
| Nandgaon T. Manor | 1,517 | 742 | 775 |
| Nandgaon T. Tarapur | 2,482 | 1,205 | 1,277 |
| Nandore | 2,330 | 1,231 | 1,099 |
| Nanivali | 2,552 | 1,329 | 1,223 |
| Navaze | 1,681 | 873 | 808 |
| Navghar | 1,094 | 555 | 539 |
| Navi Delwadi | 1,506 | 782 | 724 |
| Nawapur | 4,120 | 2,114 | 2,006 |
| Netali | 274 | 131 | 143 |
| Newale | 471 | 236 | 235 |
| Nihe | 1,941 | 991 | 950 |
| Padghe | 2,133 | 1,150 | 983 |
| Palghar | 110,701 | 59,910 | 50,791 |
| Pam Tembhi | 1,909 | 1,093 | 816 |
| Panchali | 1,187 | 611 | 576 |
| Pargaon | 1,345 | 682 | 663 |
| Parnali | 1,049 | 572 | 477 |
| Pathrali | 405 | 208 | 197 |
| Penand | 960 | 483 | 477 |
| Pochade | 584 | 302 | 282 |
| Pole | 573 | 292 | 281 |
| Popharan | 1,674 | 1,136 | 538 |
| Rambag | 546 | 285 | 261 |
| Ranishigaon | 1,331 | 671 | 660 |
| Ravate | 569 | 287 | 282 |
| Rothe | 327 | 182 | 145 |
| Sagave | 1,102 | 537 | 565 |
| Sakhare | 1,375 | 683 | 692 |
| Salgaon | 161 | 93 | 68 |
| Salivali | 1,365 | 724 | 641 |
| Salwad | 7,887 | 4,829 | 3,058 |
| Saphale | 3,419 | 1,740 | 1,679 |
| Saratodi | 754 | 395 | 359 |
| Saravali | 5,503 | 3,020 | 2,483 |
| Saravali | 625 | 333 | 292 |
| Satpati | 17,613 | 9,617 | 7,996 |
| Sawarai | 372 | 184 | 188 |
| Saware | 2,459 | 1,252 | 1,207 |
| Sawarkhand | 1,062 | 556 | 506 |
| Saye | 182 | 96 | 86 |
| Shelwadi | 1,144 | 588 | 556 |
| Shigaon | 3,466 | 1,757 | 1,709 |
| Shilte | 521 | 262 | 259 |
| Shirgaon | 5,059 | 2,573 | 2,486 |
| Somate | 1,224 | 620 | 604 |
| Sonave | 1,878 | 953 | 925 |
| Sumadi | 626 | 306 | 320 |
| Takwahal | 1,671 | 895 | 776 |
| Tamsai | 683 | 351 | 332 |
| Tandulwadi | 1,598 | 806 | 792 |
| Tembhi | 864 | 462 | 402 |
| Tembhi Khodave | 2,209 | 1,130 | 1,079 |
| Ten | 1,631 | 908 | 723 |
| Tighare | 825 | 422 | 403 |
| Tokarale | 206 | 104 | 102 |
| Uchavali | 265 | 131 | 134 |
| Uchchheli | 1,568 | 776 | 792 |
| Umbarwada T. Manor | 487 | 289 | 198 |
| Umroli | 3,707 | 1,909 | 1,798 |
| Unbhat | 1,145 | 585 | 560 |
| Usarani | 1,557 | 782 | 775 |
| Vadhi | 564 | 291 | 273 |
| Varkhunti | 735 | 378 | 357 |
| Vedhi | 1,423 | 722 | 701 |
| Vehaloli | 278 | 130 | 148 |
| Velgaon | 1,188 | 558 | 630 |
| Vengani | 693 | 344 | 349 |
| Vikaswadi | 680 | 342 | 338 |
| Vilangi | 1,954 | 954 | 1,000 |
| Virathan Bk. | 1,695 | 873 | 822 |
| Virathan Kh. | 1,186 | 585 | 601 |
| Vitthalwadi | 929 | 490 | 439 |
| Wade | 902 | 423 | 479 |
| Wadhiv Saravali | 1,089 | 589 | 500 |
| Wadrai | 3,623 | 1,771 | 1,852 |
| Wakadi | 292 | 151 | 141 |
| Walve | 951 | 473 | 478 |
| Wandivali | 367 | 190 | 177 |
| Warai | 253 | 133 | 120 |
| Warangade | 1,440 | 711 | 729 |
| Wasare | 1,342 | 698 | 644 |
| Wasaroli | 251 | 134 | 117 |
| Wave | 780 | 413 | 367 |
| Zanzroli | 811 | 414 | 397 |
| Total | 454,635 | 242,137 | 212,498 |

=== Talasari ===
Talasari taluka
| Town/Village Name | Population | Males | Females |
|---|---|---|---|
| Achchhad | 2,578 | 1,417 | 1,161 |
| Amagaon | 1,788 | 911 | 877 |
| Ambeshetgaon (N.V.) | 641 | 332 | 309 |
| Anwir | 2,528 | 1,251 | 1,277 |
| Awarpada | 1,857 | 916 | 941 |
| Baradi | 2,731 | 1,353 | 1,378 |
| Borigaon | 786 | 390 | 396 |
| Bormal | 1,341 | 659 | 682 |
| Brahmanpada | 2,050 | 1,004 | 1,046 |
| Dolharpada | 2,834 | 1,410 | 1,424 |
| Dongari | 4,247 | 2,084 | 2,163 |
| Gandhinagar | 1,312 | 646 | 666 |
| Ghimniye | 2,968 | 1,459 | 1,509 |
| Girgaon | 2,367 | 1,168 | 1,199 |
| Gorakhpur | 3,242 | 1,570 | 1,672 |
| Ibhadpada | 1,503 | 775 | 728 |
| Kajali | 869 | 459 | 410 |
| Karajgaon | 598 | 251 | 347 |
| Kawade | 4,844 | 2661 | 2183 |
| Kharadpada (N.V.) | 535 | 255 | 280 |
| Kochai | 2,867 | 1,361 | 1,506 |
| Kodad | 1,512 | 709 | 803 |
| Kurze | 4,497 | 2,165 | 2,332 |
| Manpada | 742 | 343 | 399 |
| Masanpada (N.V.) | 982 | 481 | 501 |
| Patilpada | 3,830 | 2,017 | 1,813 |
| Patilpada | 2,423 | 1,214 | 1,209 |
| Patilpada | 1,506 | 728 | 778 |
| Sagarshet | 2,607 | 1,250 | 1,357 |
| Sambha | 4,242 | 2,170 | 2,072 |
| Sawane | 2,312 | 1,296 | 1,016 |
| Sawroli | 2,818 | 1,401 | 1,417 |
| Sutarpada | 2,478 | 1,408 | 1,070 |
| Sutrakar | 6,456 | 3,177 | 3,279 |
| Talasari | 3,444 | 1,673 | 1,771 |
| Thakarpada | 1,027 | 506 | 521 |
| Thakarpada (N.V.) | 3,018 | 1,684 | 1,334 |
| Udhawa | 3,036 | 1,540 | 1,496 |
| Upalat | 8,648 | 4,420 | 4,228 |
| Vadavali | 4,602 | 2,218 | 2,384 |
| Varwade | 4,551 | 2,074 | 2,477 |
| Vasa | 4,713 | 2,280 | 2,433 |
| Vevaji | 2,346 | 1,154 | 1,192 |
| Vilatgaon (N.V.) | 677 | 348 | 329 |
| Zai | 4,013 | 2,045 | 1,968 |
| Zari | 3,251 | 1,486 | 1,765 |
| Total | 121,217 | 60,319 | 60,898 |

=== Vada ===
Vada taluka
| Town/Village Name | Population | Males | Females |
|---|---|---|---|
| Abitghar | 1,582 | 868 | 714 |
| Abje | 1,070 | 525 | 545 |
| Ainshet | 550 | 279 | 271 |
| Akhada | 379 | 184 | 195 |
| Alman | 487 | 238 | 249 |
| Ambarbhui | 573 | 304 | 269 |
| Ambhai | 556 | 293 | 263 |
| Ambiste Bk. | 927 | 473 | 454 |
| Ambiste Kh. | 1,120 | 655 | 465 |
| Amgaon | 1,047 | 530 | 517 |
| Apti | 528 | 252 | 276 |
| Asnas | 605 | 318 | 287 |
| Avandhe | 469 | 237 | 232 |
| Balivali | 407 | 202 | 205 |
| Bavali | 320 | 180 | 140 |
| Bersheti | 183 | 86 | 97 |
| Bhavehar | 798 | 418 | 380 |
| Bhopivali | 397 | 201 | 196 |
| Bilavali | 901 | 469 | 432 |
| Bilghar | 491 | 244 | 247 |
| Biloshi | 1,227 | 637 | 590 |
| Borande | 514 | 258 | 256 |
| Bramhangaon | 474 | 232 | 242 |
| Budhavali | 884 | 420 | 464 |
| Chambale | 1,200 | 619 | 581 |
| Chendavali | 488 | 245 | 243 |
| Chikhale | 910 | 466 | 444 |
| Chinchghar | 1,601 | 869 | 732 |
| Dabhon | 358 | 173 | 185 |
| Dahe | 916 | 463 | 453 |
| Dahivali Kumbhiste | 596 | 284 | 312 |
| Dakivali | 1,426 | 863 | 563 |
| Desai | 310 | 169 | 141 |
| Devali | 332 | 168 | 164 |
| Devali Tarf Kohaj | 408 | 191 | 217 |
| Devgaon | 798 | 417 | 381 |
| Devghar | 1,124 | 588 | 536 |
| Dhadhare | 479 | 237 | 242 |
| Dhapad | 155 | 82 | 73 |
| Dongaste | 438 | 236 | 202 |
| Gale | 269 | 133 | 136 |
| Galtare | 1,887 | 987 | 900 |
| Gandhare | 1,738 | 981 | 757 |
| Gargaon | 2,474 | 1,302 | 1,172 |
| Gates Kh. | 694 | 341 | 353 |
| Gates Bk. | 781 | 416 | 365 |
| Gaurapur | 1,005 | 491 | 514 |
| Ghonsai | 985 | 531 | 454 |
| Goleghar | 162 | 79 | 83 |
| Gorad | 1,153 | 584 | 569 |
| Gorhe | 2,093 | 1,050 | 1,043 |
| Guhir | 848 | 409 | 439 |
| Gunj | 1,156 | 639 | 517 |
| Hamarapur | 1,114 | 582 | 532 |
| Harosale | 583 | 291 | 292 |
| Jale | 429 | 215 | 214 |
| Jamghar | 924 | 456 | 468 |
| Kadivali | 273 | 141 | 132 |
| Kalambhai | 891 | 457 | 434 |
| Kalambhe | 647 | 330 | 317 |
| Kalambholi | 153 | 81 | 72 |
| Kalamkhand | 775 | 379 | 396 |
| Kambare | 1,185 | 594 | 591 |
| Kanchad | 1,118 | 569 | 549 |
| Kapari | 334 | 161 | 173 |
| Karanje | 404 | 210 | 194 |
| Karanjpada | 654 | 335 | 319 |
| Kasghar | 281 | 146 | 135 |
| Kati | 138 | 70 | 68 |
| Kelthan | 1,677 | 881 | 796 |
| Khaire Ambivali | 588 | 335 | 253 |
| Khaire Tarf Wada | 409 | 198 | 211 |
| Khanivali | 1,963 | 1,017 | 946 |
| Kharivali Tarf Kohoj | 1,803 | 947 | 856 |
| Kharivali Tarf Poulbar | 840 | 508 | 332 |
| Khodade | 137 | 74 | 63 |
| Khupari | 2,176 | 1,311 | 865 |
| Khutal | 406 | 207 | 199 |
| Kiravali | 229 | 119 | 110 |
| Kolim Sarovar | 168 | 80 | 88 |
| Kondhale | 2,259 | 1,241 | 1,018 |
| Kone | 1,307 | 722 | 585 |
| Konsai | 830 | 449 | 381 |
| Kudus | 4,239 | 2,585 | 1,654 |
| Kumdal | 628 | 327 | 301 |
| Kurle | 315 | 143 | 172 |
| Kuyalu | 434 | 226 | 208 |
| Lakhamapur | 411 | 209 | 202 |
| Lohape | 722 | 352 | 370 |
| Malonda | 169 | 78 | 91 |
| Mandava | 708 | 354 | 354 |
| Mande | 729 | 372 | 357 |
| Mangathane | 879 | 478 | 401 |
| Mangrul | 1,534 | 741 | 793 |
| Manivali | 242 | 122 | 120 |
| Met | 628 | 325 | 303 |
| Mhaswal | 857 | 435 | 422 |
| Moj | 776 | 378 | 398 |
| Munguste | 93 | 41 | 52 |
| Musarne | 1,347 | 808 | 539 |
| Nandani Gaigotha | 1,105 | 542 | 563 |
| Nane | 1,258 | 639 | 619 |
| Nare | 1,468 | 786 | 682 |
| Neharoli | 1,702 | 955 | 747 |
| Nichole | 585 | 317 | 268 |
| Nimbavali | 687 | 347 | 340 |
| Nishet | 251 | 127 | 124 |
| Ogada | 826 | 403 | 423 |
| Pachghar | 597 | 280 | 317 |
| Pali | 1,164 | 603 | 561 |
| Palsai | 1,076 | 542 | 534 |
| Parali | 1,335 | 734 | 601 |
| Paste | 264 | 136 | 128 |
| Pethranjani | 99 | 52 | 47 |
| Pik | 786 | 388 | 398 |
| Pimpalas | 1,214 | 615 | 599 |
| Pimparoli | 781 | 395 | 386 |
| Pinjal | 489 | 262 | 227 |
| Posheri | 1,227 | 652 | 575 |
| Sange | 834 | 437 | 397 |
| Sapane Bk. | 1,170 | 603 | 567 |
| Sapane Kh. | 1,250 | 610 | 640 |
| Saparonde | 814 | 461 | 353 |
| Saras Ohol | 324 | 163 | 161 |
| Sarshi | 610 | 329 | 281 |
| Sasane | 567 | 278 | 289 |
| Satronde | 91 | 44 | 47 |
| Savarkhand | 522 | 250 | 272 |
| Shele | 403 | 198 | 205 |
| Shelte | 365 | 184 | 181 |
| Shil | 26 | 12 | 14 |
| Shilottar | 268 | 130 | 138 |
| Shirsad | 472 | 247 | 225 |
| Sonale Bk. | 647 | 338 | 309 |
| Sonale Kh. | 644 | 327 | 317 |
| Sonshiv | 607 | 306 | 301 |
| Suponde | 755 | 377 | 378 |
| Thunave | 215 | 104 | 111 |
| Tilase | 755 | 390 | 365 |
| Tilgaon | 703 | 345 | 358 |
| Tilmal | 339 | 167 | 172 |
| Tornae | 311 | 174 | 137 |
| Tuse | 1,234 | 614 | 620 |
| Uchat | 546 | 270 | 276 |
| Ujjaini | 1,100 | 547 | 553 |
| Umrothe | 348 | 172 | 176 |
| Usar | 863 | 441 | 422 |
| Vada | 14,286 | 7,479 | 6,807 |
| Vadavali Tarf Gaon | 384 | 192 | 192 |
| Vadavali Tarf Poulbar | 2,180 | 1,301 | 879 |
| Vadavali Tarf Sonale | 196 | 94 | 102 |
| Vaghote | 181 | 85 | 96 |
| Vaitarna Nagar | 413 | 200 | 213 |
| Varai Bk. | 57 | 28 | 29 |
| Varai Kh. | 351 | 171 | 180 |
| Varale | 628 | 337 | 291 |
| Varnol | 182 | 89 | 93 |
| Varsale | 1,930 | 904 | 1,026 |
| Vasuri Bk | 876 | 460 | 416 |
| Vasuri Kh. | 1,012 | 622 | 390 |
| Vaveghar | 697 | 351 | 346 |
| Vijapur | 943 | 482 | 461 |
| Vijaygad | 699 | 348 | 351 |
| Vilkos Tarf Konpati | 462 | 232 | 230 |
| Vilkos tarf Vada | 268 | 138 | 130 |
| Virhe | 323 | 153 | 170 |
| Zadkhaire | 309 | 149 | 160 |
| Total | 142,753 | 74,704 | 68,049 |

=== Vasai ===
Vasai taluka
| Town/Village Name | Population | Males | Females |
|---|---|---|---|
| Actan | 1,286 | 642 | 644 |
| Adne | 1,665 | 877 | 788 |
| Agashi | 14,050 | 7,148 | 6,902 |
| Ambode | 417 | 212 | 205 |
| Arnala | 13,170 | 6,727 | 6,443 |
| Arnala Killa | 2,262 | 1,137 | 1,125 |
| Bapane | 929 | 511 | 418 |
| Bhaliwali | 715 | 349 | 366 |
| Bhatane | 4,401 | 2,291 | 2,110 |
| Bhatpada | 1,548 | 798 | 750 |
| Bhinar | 606 | 305 | 301 |
| Bhuigaon Bk. | 3,286 | 1,705 | 1,581 |
| Bhuigaon Kh. | 2,787 | 1,445 | 1,342 |
| Bilalpada | 5,808 | 3,302 | 2,506 |
| Bolinj | 12,064 | 6,230 | 5,834 |
| Chandansar | 3,630 | 1,908 | 1,722 |
| Chandip | 2,314 | 1,250 | 1,064 |
| Chandrapada | 4,638 | 2,425 | 2,213 |
| Chikhaldongre | 2,953 | 2,062 | 891 |
| Chimane | 370 | 269 | 101 |
| Chinchoti | 1,074 | 524 | 550 |
| Chobare | 1,395 | 724 | 671 |
| Dahisar | 1,314 | 634 | 680 |
| Deodal | 926 | 560 | 366 |
| Depivali | 1,083 | 520 | 563 |
| Dhaniv | 3,972 | 2,236 | 1,736 |
| Dolivpada | 790 | 458 | 332 |
| Gas | 8,135 | 4,220 | 3,915 |
| Gaskopari | 759 | 400 | 359 |
| Girij | 3,030 | 1,522 | 1,508 |
| Hedavade | 867 | 699 | 168 |
| Juchandra | 5,911 | 3,214 | 2,697 |
| Kalamb | 4,976 | 2,520 | 2,456 |
| Kalambhon | 970 | 510 | 460 |
| Kaman | 4,635 | 2,580 | 2,055 |
| Kaner | 1,256 | 643 | 613 |
| Karadi | 872 | 425 | 447 |
| Karanjon | 768 | 394 | 374 |
| Karmale | 1,427 | 721 | 706 |
| Kasarali | 3,134 | 1,972 | 1,162 |
| Kashidkopar | 2,334 | 1,336 | 998 |
| Kaular Bk. | 2,475 | 1,232 | 1,243 |
| Kaular Kh. | 2,171 | 1,098 | 1,073 |
| Khairpada | 989 | 545 | 444 |
| Khaniwade | 1,994 | 996 | 998 |
| Khardi | 1,378 | 674 | 704 |
| Khochivade | 2,604 | 1,344 | 1,260 |
| Kiravali | 765 | 386 | 379 |
| Kolhapur | 1,166 | 583 | 583 |
| Kolhi | 1,501 | 871 | 630 |
| Kopri | 3,037 | 1,606 | 1,431 |
| Koshimbe | 1,044 | 506 | 538 |
| Majivali | 770 | 386 | 384 |
| Malaji Pada | 1,452 | 740 | 712 |
| Mandvi | 923 | 463 | 460 |
| Mardes | 1,490 | 785 | 705 |
| Medhe | 1,076 | 521 | 555 |
| Mori | 910 | 462 | 448 |
| Mukkam | 1,999 | 1,008 | 991 |
| Mulgaon | 2,920 | 1,436 | 1,484 |
| Nagale | 1,404 | 703 | 701 |
| Naigaon | 4,679 | 2,466 | 2,213 |
| Nale | 1,428 | 725 | 703 |
| Navale | 2,156 | 1,158 | 998 |
| Navasai | 990 | 506 | 484 |
| Nirmal | 2,345 | 1,265 | 1,080 |
| Pali | 739 | 375 | 364 |
| Panju | 1,362 | 720 | 642 |
| Parol | 1,912 | 970 | 942 |
| Patilgaon | 1,777 | 897 | 880 |
| Pelhar | 11,785 | 7,022 | 4,763 |
| Poman | 1,669 | 873 | 796 |
| Rajavali | 2,319 | 1,172 | 1,147 |
| Rajodi | 3,527 | 1,791 | 1,736 |
| Rangaon | 3,640 | 1,877 | 1,763 |
| Saiwan | 2,185 | 1,076 | 1,109 |
| Sakawar | 2,711 | 1,372 | 1,339 |
| Saloli | 4,355 | 2,099 | 2,256 |
| Sarjamori | 349 | 184 | 165 |
| Sasunavghar | 2,049 | 1,131 | 918 |
| Sativali | 9,482 | 5,885 | 3,597 |
| Satpale | 3,622 | 1,875 | 1,747 |
| Shilottar | 326 | 156 | 170 |
| Shirgaon | 3,262 | 1,667 | 1,595 |
| Shirsad | 1,324 | 693 | 631 |
| Shirvali | 1,406 | 727 | 679 |
| Shivansai | 1,246 | 653 | 593 |
| Tarkhad | 1,182 | 597 | 585 |
| Tembhi | 2,842 | 1,451 | 1,391 |
| Tilher | 3,606 | 1,792 | 1,814 |
| Tivari | 1,265 | 665 | 600 |
| Tokare | 1,369 | 678 | 691 |
| Umele | 7,071 | 3,684 | 3,387 |
| Umrale | 4,555 | 2,341 | 2,214 |
| Usgaon | 2,374 | 1,204 | 1,170 |
| Vadavali | 3,637 | 1,821 | 1,816 |
| Vadghar | 734 | 399 | 335 |
| Vasai | 518,601 | 276,682 | 241,919 |
| Vaslai | 3,765 | 1,908 | 1,857 |
| Vatar | 5,704 | 2,967 | 2,737 |
| Wagholi | 5,919 | 3,037 | 2,882 |
| Total | 795,863 | 423,310 | 372,553 |

=== Vikramgad ===
Vikramgad taluka
| Town/Village Name | Population | Males | Females |
|---|---|---|---|
| Alonde | 2,620 | 1,252 | 1,368 |
| Ambeghar (Balapur) | 901 | 426 | 475 |
| Ambeghar Dharampur | 656 | 285 | 371 |
| Ambivali | 754 | 385 | 369 |
| Anandpur | 713 | 340 | 373 |
| Andhari | 483 | 236 | 247 |
| Apti Bk. | 1,005 | 470 | 535 |
| Apti Kh. | 418 | 208 | 210 |
| Balapur | 2,176 | 1,058 | 1,118 |
| Bandhan | 1,057 | 520 | 537 |
| Bangarchole | 423 | 220 | 203 |
| Baste | 439 | 196 | 243 |
| Bhanapur (N.V.) | 504 | 247 | 257 |
| Bhavadi | 190 | 94 | 96 |
| Bhopoli | 1,167 | 646 | 521 |
| Borande | 1,378 | 688 | 690 |
| Chandranagar (N.V.) | 1,081 | 478 | 603 |
| Chari Bk. | 339 | 158 | 181 |
| Chinchghar | 1,266 | 618 | 648 |
| Dadade | 3,549 | 1,731 | 1,818 |
| Deharje | 1,527 | 740 | 787 |
| Devapur (N.V.) | 612 | 241 | 371 |
| Dhamani | 1,112 | 547 | 565 |
| Dolhari Bk. | 1,249 | 558 | 691 |
| Dolhari Kh. | 1,671 | 836 | 835 |
| Gadadhe | 593 | 285 | 308 |
| Ghaneghar | 957 | 473 | 484 |
| Ghanode | 460 | 197 | 263 |
| Hanumantpada | 552 | 278 | 274 |
| Hatane | 433 | 226 | 207 |
| Indgaon | 1,402 | 707 | 695 |
| Jambhe | 1,511 | 700 | 811 |
| Karhe | 1,134 | 550 | 584 |
| Karsud | 1,827 | 873 | 954 |
| Kasa Bk | 1,834 | 871 | 963 |
| Kashivali Tarf Alonde | 414 | 201 | 213 |
| Kawadas | 654 | 315 | 339 |
| Kawale | 901 | 482 | 419 |
| Kegva | 1,609 | 741 | 868 |
| Kev | 1,686 | 865 | 821 |
| Khadaki | 1,922 | 920 | 1,002 |
| Khand | 1,365 | 682 | 683 |
| Khandeghar | 389 | 174 | 215 |
| Khoste | 1,074 | 515 | 559 |
| Khuded | 1,734 | 843 | 891 |
| Kondgaon | 1,488 | 729 | 759 |
| Kosesari | 869 | 430 | 439 |
| Kunj | 1,884 | 905 | 979 |
| Kurze | 3,724 | 1,898 | 1,826 |
| Madacha Pada (N.V.) | 925 | 539 | 386 |
| Male | 750 | 374 | 376 |
| Malwade | 2,166 | 1,086 | 1,080 |
| Man | 839 | 433 | 406 |
| Medhi | 720 | 347 | 373 |
| Mhasaroli | 861 | 425 | 436 |
| Moho Bk. | 817 | 399 | 418 |
| Moho Kh. | 875 | 429 | 446 |
| Murbad | 2,147 | 1,127 | 1,020 |
| Nagzari | 170 | 85 | 85 |
| Nalshet | 358 | 185 | 173 |
| Onde | 1,147 | 574 | 573 |
| Pimpalshet Bk. | 1,298 | 627 | 671 |
| Pochade | 800 | 389 | 411 |
| Potkhal | 741 | 345 | 396 |
| Rampur | 703 | 357 | 346 |
| Sajan | 470 | 247 | 223 |
| Sakhare | 2,052 | 1,033 | 1,019 |
| Sangamnagar (N.V.) | 248 | 112 | 136 |
| Sarshi | 2,086 | 932 | 1,154 |
| Satkor | 1,249 | 617 | 632 |
| Savaroli | 627 | 315 | 312 |
| Sawade | 2,113 | 981 | 1,132 |
| Sawarai (N.V.) | 379 | 199 | 180 |
| Shavate | 948 | 446 | 502 |
| Shelpada | 483 | 259 | 224 |
| Shil | 566 | 288 | 278 |
| Shil | 440 | 206 | 234 |
| Shilshet | 558 | 301 | 257 |
| Suksale | 860 | 429 | 431 |
| Talavali Tarf Dengachimet | 1,388 | 677 | 711 |
| Talavali Tarf Satkor | 1,546 | 773 | 773 |
| Talawade | 2,869 | 1,459 | 1,410 |
| Tembholi | 344 | 179 | 165 |
| Tetawali | 1,038 | 535 | 503 |
| Therunde | 802 | 406 | 396 |
| Uparale | 1,262 | 636 | 626 |
| Utavali | 996 | 503 | 493 |
| Vadapoli | 231 | 116 | 115 |
| Vangarje | 1,947 | 913 | 1,034 |
| Varanwadi (N.V.) | 382 | 191 | 191 |
| Vasuri | 1,649 | 814 | 835 |
| Vedhe | 585 | 260 | 325 |
| Veti | 2,257 | 1,089 | 1,168 |
| Vikramgad | 4,045 | 2,187 | 1,858 |
| Vilshet | 761 | 378 | 383 |
| Vittalnagar (N.V.) | 344 | 176 | 168 |
| Waki | 1,124 | 554 | 570 |
| Wehelpada | 2,169 | 1,040 | 1,129 |
| Yashwantnagar | 2,098 | 1,055 | 1,043 |
| Zadapoli | 315 | 138 | 177 |
| Total | 114,254 | 56,203 | 58,051 |
