= Saparonde =

Village in Maharashtra, India

- village
- Location within Maharashtra Location within India
- Coordinates: 19°31′39″N 73°06′32″E
- Country: India
- State: Maharashtra
- District: Palghar
- Taluka: Vada

Area
  - Total: 0.41 km^{2} (0.16 sq mi)
- Elevation: 42 m (138 ft)

Population (2011)
  - Total: 1,104
  - Density: 2,700/km^{2} (7,000/sq mi)
- Postal Index Number: 421303
- Area code: 02526
- Vehicle registration: MH/48/04/05

Saparonde is a village in Vada Taluka of Palghar District, in the state of Maharashtra, India.

== Geography ==
The village is located on the southern part of Vada Taluka, and 18 km south of Vada City. It is connected to the National Highway 848 through the Uchat Road.

== Demographics ==
As per the 2011 Indian Census, there are 268 households living in the village. Out of the total population of 1,104, 575 are male and 529 are female. The literacy rate of the village is 67.56 percent, with 362 males and 267 females being literate. The number of children aged zero to six years in the village is 173, which takes up 15.67 percent of the total population.
