= Dhadhare =

Coordinates: 19.6733°N 73.2533°E

Dhadhre
- Town
- Interactive map of Dhadhre
- Country: India
- Province: Maharashtra
- District: Thane
- Taluka: Shahapur
- Time zone: IST (UTC +5.30)
- PIN: 421303

Dhadhare, or Dadhare/Dadre, is a village in Thane district, Maharashtra, India. Zilla parishad (primary school) is the main source of schooling there. The main water source is the Shai river, a right-bank tributary of the Vaitarna.

== Occupation ==
The main occupation of people in this village is agriculture, mostly rice. The rock quarry business is also a backbone of the economy in this area.
