= Anjur (Maharashtra) =

Village in Maharashtra

- village
- Location in Maharashtra, India
- Coordinates: 19.21037°N 73.04643090000002°E
- Country: India
- State: Maharashtra
- District: Thane

Population (2011)
  - Total: 2,937

Languages
  - Official: Marathi
- Time zone: UTC+5:30 (IST)
- PIN: 421302

Anjur is a village in the Thane region, Maharashtra state.
