= Kharegaon =

Kharigaon is a town in Kalwa, Thane. It is part of the Thane Municipal Corporation (TMC). The size of the village has increased manyfold in recent years, spurred on by a residential boom due to people moving away from Mumbai to find affordable homes and good amenities. Kharigaon has a predominantly Maharashtrian population, though it also includes other religious groups.

People in this region celebrate Heera Devi jatra in Kharigaon, Kalwa. The Heera Devi festival is a unique festival celebration the region's culture and historical significance. The peoples of aagri community live there together. The Navratri festival held in this village is 1 of the famous festival, people from many other villages, cities comes here to enjoy.

Notable Places are Vithoba Devasthan, Shree mahadu nagnath lake (Kharegaon lake) and Araneshwar Temple. Also Mumbai Nashik Highway connects the Kharegaon's Service Road.

90ft road is one of the famous and well developed place in the kharegaon.

Normally Maharashtrian cuisine is popular here, while several residential complex

have been built in recent years. The Shivsena dominates the area in the elections along with NCP.rs.
