= Bhatane =

Village in Maharashtra, India

Bhatane (भाताणे)
- Village
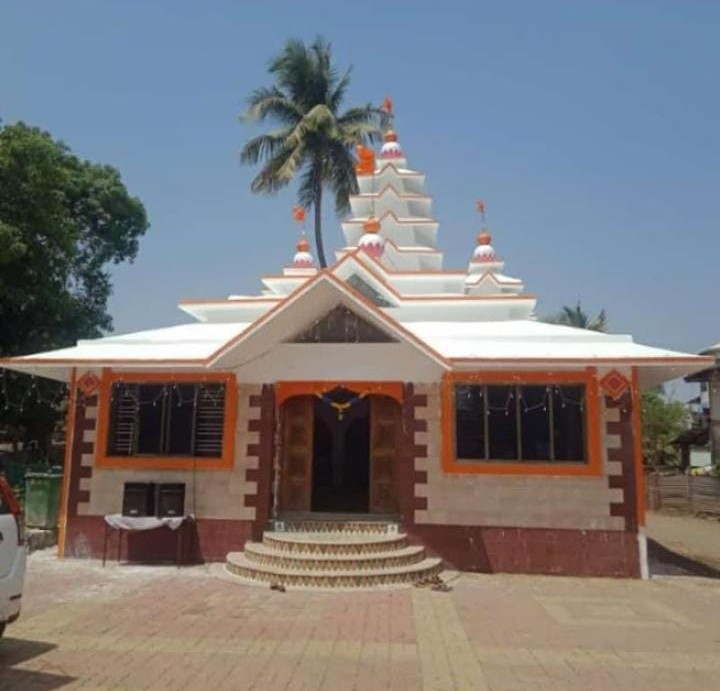
- Hanuman Temple at Bhatane Village

- Location in Maharashtra, India Bhatane (भाताणे) (India)
- Coordinates: 19.48°N 72.92°E
- Country: India
- State: Maharashtra
- District: Palghar district
- Taluka: Vasai

Languages
  - Official: Marathi
- Time zone: UTC+5:30 (IST)
- PIN: 401303
- Nearest city: Vasai

Bhatane is a village in the Vasai taluka of Palghar district located in Maharashtra state, India.

== Gallery ==
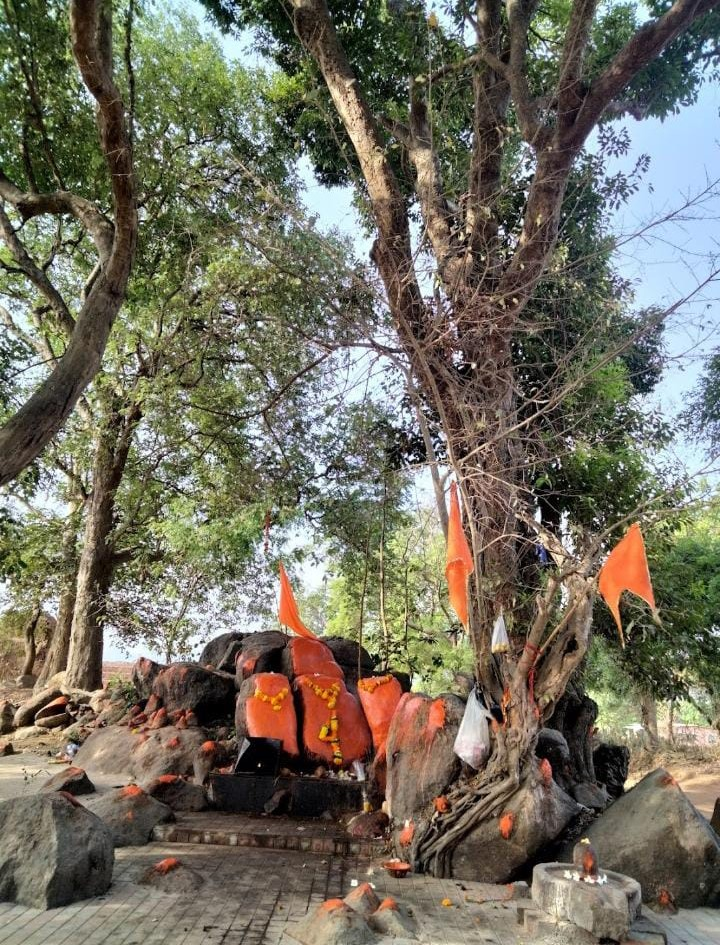
Chedoba Temple at Bhatane Village

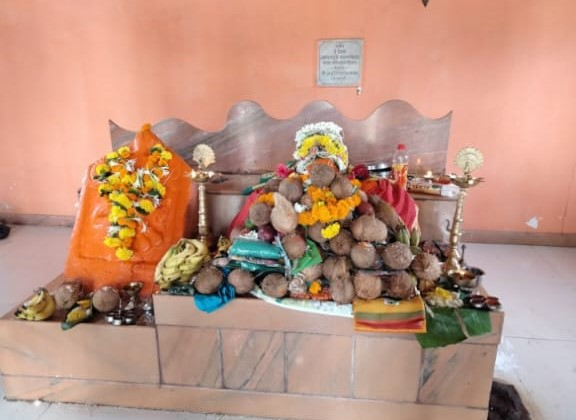
Gaondevi Temple at Bhatane Village

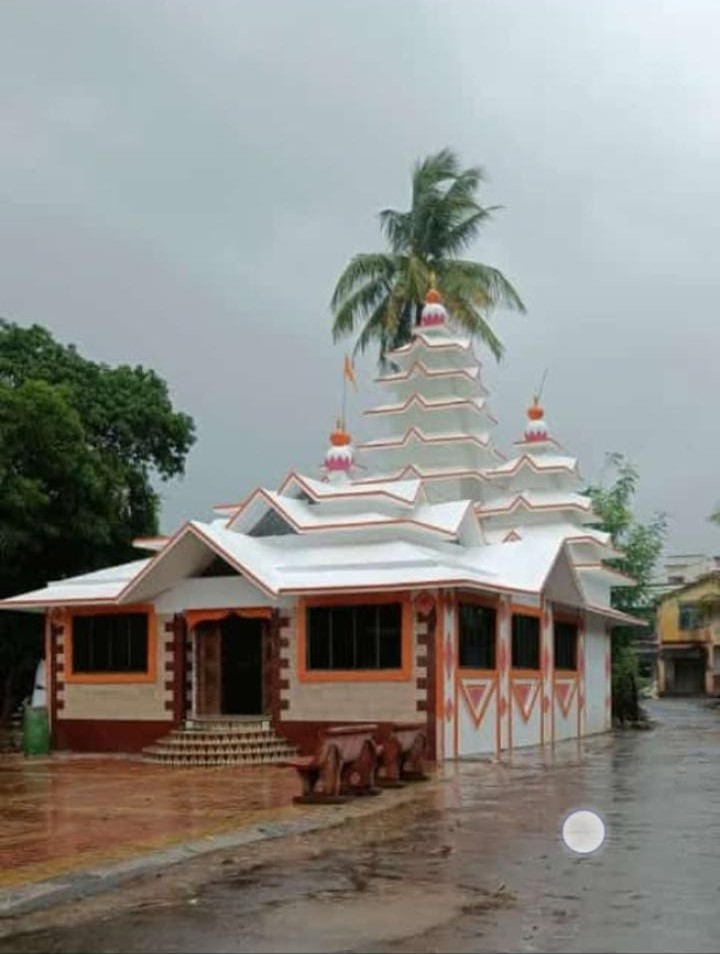
Hanuman Temple at Bhatane Village - another view

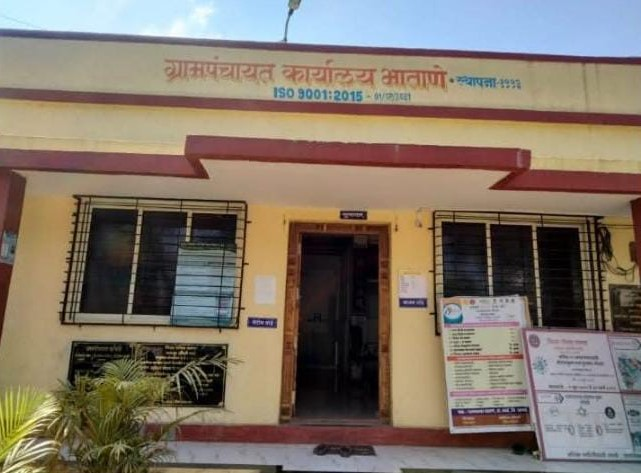
Bhatane Gram Panchayat office

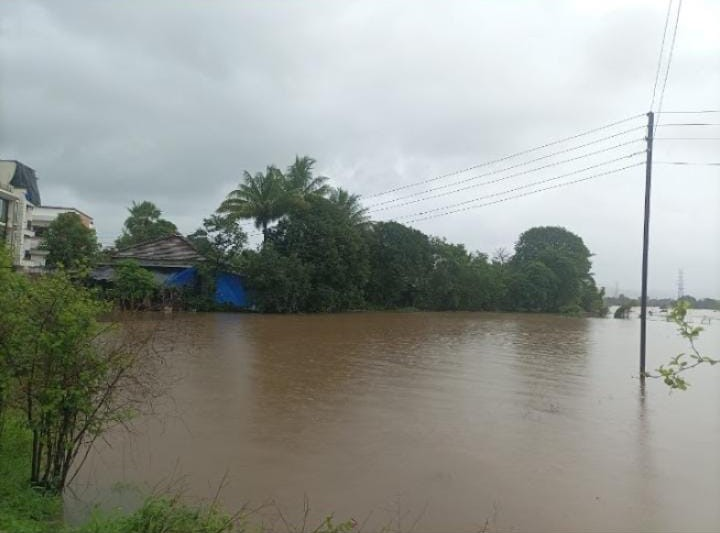
Vaitarna river flood situation in 2019

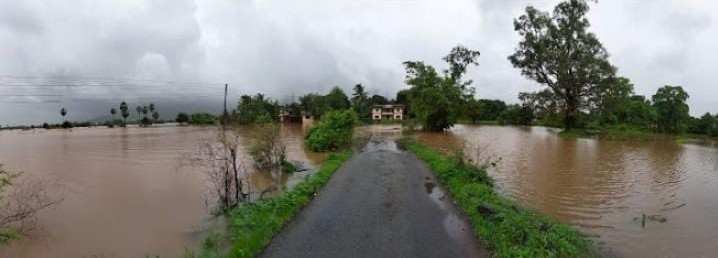
Another view of Vaitarna river flood situation in 2019

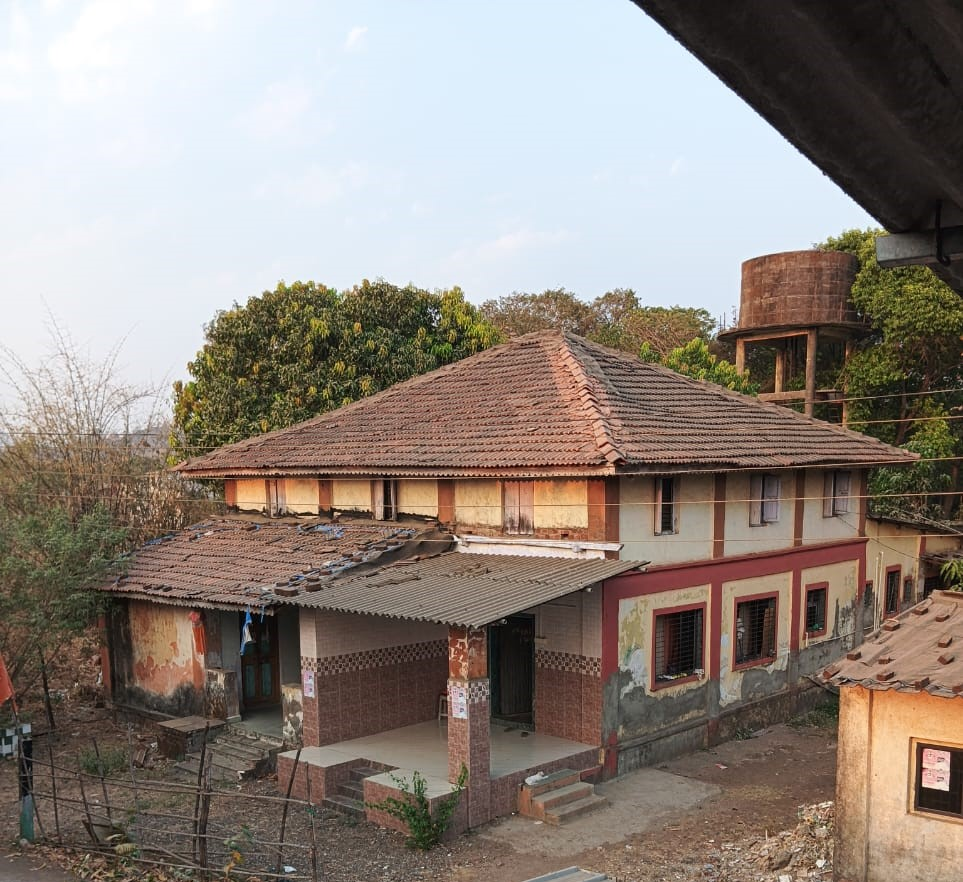
A 2 storeyed house built in 1958 in Bhatane village
