= Vada, Palghar =

Wada
- City
- Wada
- Location in Maharashtra, India
- Coordinates: 19.39°N 73.08°E
- Country: India
- State: Maharashtra
- District: Palghar

Government
  - Type: Nagarpanchayat
- Elevation: 38 m (125 ft)

Population (2011)
  - Total: 128,467

Languages
  - Official: Marathi
- Time zone: UTC+5:30 (IST)
- PIN: 421303
- Telephone code: 02526
- Vehicle registration: MH-48
- Nearest city: Palghar, Manor, Bhiwandi, Vasai-Virar, Thane

Wada is one of the eight talukas of the Palghar district in the Konkan division of Maharashtra state in India. It is one of the most industrialised talukas in Palghar district.

== Geography ==
Wada is located at 19.65°N 73.13°E. It has an average elevation of 38 metres (124 feet). It formerly belonged to Thane district.

The main rivers flowing through Wada are the Vaitarna and the Pinjal, and there are three main lakes in Wada town. Kohoj Killa, a fort, is located near Kanchad Village at Vaghote.

== Demographics ==
The 2011 India census put the population of Wada taluka at 142,753, with 52.33% males and 47.66% females. Of the total population, 128,467 persons live in rural areas and 14,286 in urban areas.
