= Shil =

Shil may refer to:

- Shil, Borande, a village in Palghar district of Maharashtra, India
- Shil, Moho Budruk, a village in Palghar district of Maharashtra, India
