= Yashwantnagar =

Village in Maharashtra

- village
- Location in Maharashtra, India Yashwantnagar (India)
- Coordinates: 19.7994759°N 73.1098806°E
- Country: India
- State: Maharashtra
- District: Palghar
- Taluka: Vikramgad
- Elevation: 63 m (207 ft)

Population (2011)
  - Total: 1,865
- Time zone: UTC+5:30 (IST)
- 2011 census code: 551791

Yashwantnagar is a village in the Palghar district of Maharashtra, India. It is located in the Vikramgad taluka.

== Demographics ==
According to the 2011 census of India, Yashwantnagar has 375 households. The effective literacy rate (i.e. the literacy rate of population excluding children aged 6 and below) is 76.36%.

Demographics (2011 Census)
	Total	Male	Female
Population	1865	931	934
Children aged below 6 years	249	127	122
Scheduled caste	15	5	10
Scheduled tribe	1638	814	824
Literates	1234	683	551
Workers (all)	864	466	398
Main workers (total)	743	416	327
Main workers: Cultivators	300	146	154
Main workers: Agricultural labourers	273	142	131
Main workers: Household industry workers	28	20	8
Main workers: Other	142	108	34
Marginal workers (total)	121	50	71
Marginal workers: Cultivators	40	14	26
Marginal workers: Agricultural labourers	64	25	39
Marginal workers: Household industry workers	0	0	0
Marginal workers: Others	17	11	6
Non-workers	1001	465	536
