= Kegva =

Village in Maharashtra

- village
- Location in Maharashtra, India Kegva (India)
- Coordinates: 19.8460338°N 73.0700421°E
- Country: India
- State: Maharashtra
- District: Palghar
- Taluka: Vikramgad
- Elevation: 58 m (190 ft)

Population (2011)
  - Total: 2,074
- Time zone: UTC+5:30 (IST)
- 2011 census code: 551771

Kegva is a village in the Palghar district of Maharashtra, India. It is located in the Vikramgad taluka.

== Demographics ==
According to the 2011 census of India, Kegva has 391 households. The effective literacy rate (i.e. the literacy rate of population excluding children aged 6 and below) is 47.02%.

Demographics (2011 Census)
	Total	Male	Female
Population	2074	996	1078
Children aged below 6 years	379	192	187
Scheduled caste	0	0	0
Scheduled tribe	2070	995	1075
Literates	797	464	333
Workers (all)	1356	642	714
Main workers (total)	1293	612	681
Main workers: Cultivators	1205	572	633
Main workers: Agricultural labourers	39	19	20
Main workers: Household industry workers	5	4	1
Main workers: Other	44	17	27
Marginal workers (total)	63	30	33
Marginal workers: Cultivators	14	7	7
Marginal workers: Agricultural labourers	9	5	4
Marginal workers: Household industry workers	1	0	1
Marginal workers: Others	39	18	21
Non-workers	718	354	364
