= Dadade =

Village in Maharashtra

- village
- Location in Maharashtra, India Dadade (India)
- Coordinates: 19.8541106°N 73.0346244°E
- Country: India
- State: Maharashtra
- District: Palghar
- Taluka: Vikramgad
- Elevation: 108 m (354 ft)

Population (2011)
  - Total: 5,251
- Time zone: UTC+5:30 (IST)
- 2011 census code: 551772

Dadade is a village in the Palghar district of Maharashtra, India. It is located in the Vikramgad taluka.

== Demographics ==
According to the 2011 census of India, Dadade has 851 households. The effective literacy rate (i.e. the literacy rate of population excluding children aged 6 and below) is 61.69%.

Demographics (2011 Census)
	Total	Male	Female
Population	5251	2622	2629
Children aged below 6 years	866	419	447
Scheduled caste	2	1	1
Scheduled tribe	5189	2588	2601
Literates	2705	1554	1151
Workers (all)	2407	1243	1164
Main workers (total)	2288	1149	1139
Main workers: Cultivators	1583	780	803
Main workers: Agricultural labourers	626	308	318
Main workers: Household industry workers	5	1	4
Main workers: Other	74	60	14
Marginal workers (total)	119	94	25
Marginal workers: Cultivators	16	7	9
Marginal workers: Agricultural labourers	97	84	13
Marginal workers: Household industry workers	1	1	0
Marginal workers: Others	5	2	3
Non-workers	2844	1379	1465
