= Sangamnagar =

Village in Maharashtra

- village
- Location in Maharashtra, India Sangamnagar (India)
- Coordinates: 19.8184777°N 73.1275844°E
- Country: India
- State: Maharashtra
- District: Palghar
- Taluka: Vikramgad
- Elevation: 79 m (259 ft)

Population (2011)
  - Total: 484
- Time zone: UTC+5:30 (IST)
- 2011 census code: 551792

Sangamnagar is a village in the Palghar district of Maharashtra, India. It is located in the Vikramgad taluka.

== Demographics ==
According to the 2011 census of India, Sangamnagar has 101 households. The effective literacy rate (i.e. the literacy rate of population excluding children aged 6 and below) is 58.35%.

Demographics (2011 Census)
	Total	Male	Female
Population	484	238	246
Children aged below 6 years	83	41	42
Scheduled caste	0	0	0
Scheduled tribe	466	229	237
Literates	234	124	110
Workers (all)	277	140	137
Main workers (total)	277	140	137
Main workers: Cultivators	97	48	49
Main workers: Agricultural labourers	171	86	85
Main workers: Household industry workers	0	0	0
Main workers: Other	9	6	3
Marginal workers (total)	0	0	0
Marginal workers: Cultivators	0	0	0
Marginal workers: Agricultural labourers	0	0	0
Marginal workers: Household industry workers	0	0	0
Marginal workers: Others	0	0	0
Non-workers	207	98	109
