= Varanwadi =

Village in Maharashtra

- village
- Location in Maharashtra, India Varanwadi (India)
- Coordinates: 19.901613°N 73.1379109°E
- Country: India
- State: Maharashtra
- District: Palghar
- Taluka: Vikramgad
- Elevation: 184 m (604 ft)

Population (2011)
  - Total: 1,054
- Time zone: UTC+5:30 (IST)
- 2011 census code: 551763

Varanwadi is a village in the Palghar district of Maharashtra, India. It is located in the Vikramgad taluka.

== Demographics ==
According to the 2011 census of India, Varanwadi has 190 households. The effective literacy rate (i.e. the literacy rate of population excluding children aged 6 and below) is 46.96%.

Demographics (2011 Census)
	Total	Male	Female
Population	1054	529	525
Children aged below 6 years	198	100	98
Scheduled caste	0	0	0
Scheduled tribe	1054	529	525
Literates	402	250	152
Workers (all)	581	313	268
Main workers (total)	365	193	172
Main workers: Cultivators	165	92	73
Main workers: Agricultural labourers	172	81	91
Main workers: Household industry workers	1	1	0
Main workers: Other	27	19	8
Marginal workers (total)	216	120	96
Marginal workers: Cultivators	3	2	1
Marginal workers: Agricultural labourers	185	100	85
Marginal workers: Household industry workers	0	0	0
Marginal workers: Others	28	18	10
Non-workers	473	216	257
