= Khandeghar =

Village in Maharashtra

- village
- Location in Maharashtra, India Khandeghar (India)
- Coordinates: 19°45′54″N 73°02′15″E
- Country: India
- State: Maharashtra
- District: Palghar
- Taluka: Vikramgad
- Elevation: 34 m (112 ft)

Population (2011)
  - Total: 643
- Time zone: UTC+5:30 (IST)
- 2011 census code: 551808

Khandeghar is a village in the Palghar district of Maharashtra, India. It is located in the Vikramgad taluka.

== Demographics ==
According to the 2011 census of India, Khandeghar has 98 households. The effective literacy rate (i.e. the literacy rate of population excluding children aged 6 and below) is 43.98%.

Demographics (2011 Census)
	Total	Male	Female
Population	643	335	308
Children aged below 6 years	111	67	44
Scheduled caste	0	0	0
Scheduled tribe	643	335	308
Literates	234	141	93
Workers (all)	340	164	176
Main workers (total)	338	164	174
Main workers: Cultivators	15	5	10
Main workers: Agricultural labourers	323	159	164
Main workers: Household industry workers	0	0	0
Main workers: Other	0	0	0
Marginal workers (total)	2	0	2
Marginal workers: Cultivators	0	0	0
Marginal workers: Agricultural labourers	2	0	2
Marginal workers: Household industry workers	0	0	0
Marginal workers: Others	0	0	0
Non-workers	303	171	132
