= Dolhari Budruk =

Village in Maharashtra

Dolhari Budruk Dolhari Bk.
- village
- Location in Maharashtra, India Dolhari Budruk (India)
- Coordinates: 19.8267468°N 73.0198654°E
- Country: India
- State: Maharashtra
- District: Palghar
- Taluka: Vikramgad
- Elevation: 82 m (269 ft)

Population (2011)
  - Total: 2,252
- Time zone: UTC+5:30 (IST)
- 2011 census code: 551775

Dolhari Budruk is a village in the Palghar district of Maharashtra, India. It is located in the Vikramgad taluka.

== Demographics ==
According to the 2011 census of India, Dolhari Budruk has 390 households. The effective literacy rate (i.e. the literacy rate of population excluding children aged 6 and below) is 50.72%.

Demographics (2011 Census)
	Total	Male	Female
Population	2252	1073	1179
Children aged below 6 years	434	212	222
Scheduled caste	0	0	0
Scheduled tribe	2242	1068	1174
Literates	922	521	401
Workers (all)	1174	566	608
Main workers (total)	941	559	382
Main workers: Cultivators	673	401	272
Main workers: Agricultural labourers	251	145	106
Main workers: Household industry workers	1	1	0
Main workers: Other	16	12	4
Marginal workers (total)	233	7	226
Marginal workers: Cultivators	84	5	79
Marginal workers: Agricultural labourers	149	2	147
Marginal workers: Household industry workers	0	0	0
Marginal workers: Others	0	0	0
Non-workers	1078	507	571
