= Hanumantpada =

Village in Maharashtra

- village
- Location in Maharashtra, India Hanumantpada (India)
- Coordinates: 19.8180031°N 73.1674128°E
- Country: India
- State: Maharashtra
- District: Palghar
- Taluka: Vikramgad
- Elevation: 143 m (469 ft)

Population (2011)
  - Total: 807
- Time zone: UTC+5:30 (IST)
- 2011 census code: 551796

Hanumantpada is a village in the Palghar district of Maharashtra, India. It is located in the Vikramgad taluka.

== Demographics ==
According to the 2011 census of India, Hanumantpada has 154 households. The effective literacy rate (i.e. the literacy rate of population excluding children aged 6 and below) is 50.68%.

Demographics (2011 Census)
	Total	Male	Female
Population	807	394	413
Children aged below 6 years	144	62	82
Scheduled caste	0	0	0
Scheduled tribe	805	393	412
Literates	336	202	134
Workers (all)	381	208	173
Main workers (total)	21	13	8
Main workers: Cultivators	10	5	5
Main workers: Agricultural labourers	8	5	3
Main workers: Household industry workers	1	1	0
Main workers: Other	2	2	0
Marginal workers (total)	360	195	165
Marginal workers: Cultivators	196	107	89
Marginal workers: Agricultural labourers	160	86	74
Marginal workers: Household industry workers	1	0	1
Marginal workers: Others	3	2	1
Non-workers	426	186	240
