= Gadadhe =

Village in Maharashtra

- village
- Location in Maharashtra, India Gadadhe (India)
- Coordinates: 19.8152014°N 73.0788957°E
- Country: India
- State: Maharashtra
- District: Palghar
- Taluka: Vikramgad
- Elevation: 51 m (167 ft)

Population (2011)
  - Total: 839
- Time zone: UTC+5:30 (IST)
- 2011 census code: 551789

Gadadhe is a village in the Palghar district of Maharashtra, India. It is located in the Vikramgad taluka.

== Demographics ==
According to the 2011 census of India, Gadadhe had 172 households. The effective literacy rate (i.e. the literacy rate of population excluding children aged 6 and below) is 60.48%.

Demographics (2011 Census)
| | Total | Male | Female |
|---|---|---|---|
| Population | 839 | 424 | 415 |
| Children aged below 6 years | 133 | 69 | 64 |
| Scheduled caste | 0 | 0 | 0 |
| Scheduled tribe | 836 | 423 | 413 |
| Literates | 427 | 250 | 177 |
| Workers (all) | 494 | 242 | 252 |
| Main workers (total) | 424 | 207 | 217 |
| Main workers: Cultivators | 285 | 136 | 149 |
| Main workers: Agricultural labourers | 124 | 61 | 63 |
| Main workers: Household industry workers | 2 | 1 | 1 |
| Main workers: Other | 13 | 9 | 4 |
| Marginal workers (total) | 70 | 35 | 35 |
| Marginal workers: Cultivators | 3 | 1 | 2 |
| Marginal workers: Agricultural labourers | 2 | 1 | 1 |
| Marginal workers: Household industry workers | 0 | 0 | 0 |
| Marginal workers: Others | 65 | 33 | 32 |
| Non-workers | 345 | 182 | 163 |
