= Talavali Tarf Satkor =

Village in Maharashtra

- village
- Location in Maharashtra, India Talavali Tarf Satkor (India)
- Coordinates: 19.794492°N 72.9844401°E
- Country: India
- State: Maharashtra
- District: Palghar
- Taluka: Vikramgad
- Elevation: 51 m (167 ft)

Population (2011)
  - Total: 2,222
- Time zone: UTC+5:30 (IST)
- 2011 census code: 551779

Talavali Tarf Satkor is a village in the Palghar district of Maharashtra, India. It is located in the Vikramgad taluka.

== Demographics ==
According to the 2011 census of India, Talavali Tarf Satkor has 379 households. The effective literacy rate (i.e. the literacy rate of population excluding children aged 6 and below) is 73.21%.

Demographics (2011 Census)
	Total	Male	Female
Population	2222	1107	1115
Children aged below 6 years	277	143	134
Scheduled caste	0	0	0
Scheduled tribe	2208	1098	1110
Literates	1424	785	639
Workers (all)	1025	535	490
Main workers (total)	493	236	257
Main workers: Cultivators	396	184	212
Main workers: Agricultural labourers	44	16	28
Main workers: Household industry workers	3	2	1
Main workers: Other	50	34	16
Marginal workers (total)	532	299	233
Marginal workers: Cultivators	467	256	211
Marginal workers: Agricultural labourers	42	31	11
Marginal workers: Household industry workers	3	2	1
Marginal workers: Others	20	10	10
Non-workers	1197	572	625
