= Shavate =

Village in Maharashtra

- village
- Location in Maharashtra, India Shavate (India)
- Coordinates: 19.8275638°N 73.1172573°E
- Country: India
- State: Maharashtra
- District: Palghar
- Taluka: Vikramgad
- Elevation: 82 m (269 ft)

Population (2011)
  - Total: 1,066
- Time zone: UTC+5:30 (IST)
- 2011 census code: 551766

Shavate is a village in the Palghar district of Maharashtra, India. It is located in the Vikramgad taluka.

== Demographics ==
According to the 2011 census of India, Shavate has 248 households. The effective literacy rate (i.e. the literacy rate of population excluding children aged 6 and below) is 63.25%.

Demographics (2011 Census)
| | Total | Male | Female |
|---|---|---|---|
| Population | 1066 | 535 | 531 |
| Children aged below 6 years | 149 | 77 | 72 |
| Scheduled caste | 0 | 0 | 0 |
| Scheduled tribe | 1055 | 530 | 525 |
| Literates | 580 | 336 | 244 |
| Workers (all) | 695 | 342 | 353 |
| Main workers (total) | 599 | 296 | 303 |
| Main workers: Cultivators | 283 | 137 | 146 |
| Main workers: Agricultural labourers | 277 | 127 | 150 |
| Main workers: Household industry workers | 6 | 5 | 1 |
| Main workers: Other | 33 | 27 | 6 |
| Marginal workers (total) | 96 | 46 | 50 |
| Marginal workers: Cultivators | 40 | 16 | 24 |
| Marginal workers: Agricultural labourers | 47 | 25 | 22 |
| Marginal workers: Household industry workers | 2 | 0 | 2 |
| Marginal workers: Others | 7 | 5 | 2 |
| Non-workers | 371 | 193 | 178 |
