= Therunde =

Village in Maharashtra

- village
- Location in Maharashtra, India Therunde (India)
- Coordinates: 19.890984°N 73.0582368°E
- Country: India
- State: Maharashtra
- District: Palghar
- Taluka: Vikramgad
- Elevation: 145 m (476 ft)

Population (2011)
  - Total: 910
- Time zone: UTC+5:30 (IST)
- 2011 census code: 551751

Therunde is a village in the Palghar district of Maharashtra, India. It is located in the Vikramgad taluka.

== Demographics ==
According to the 2011 census of India, Therunde has 178 households. The effective literacy rate (i.e. the literacy rate of population excluding children aged 6 and below) is 67.02%.

Demographics (2011 Census)
	Total	Male	Female
Population	910	436	474
Children aged below 6 years	152	76	76
Scheduled caste	0	0	0
Scheduled tribe	903	433	470
Literates	508	299	209
Workers (all)	384	239	145
Main workers (total)	249	213	36
Main workers: Cultivators	178	157	21
Main workers: Agricultural labourers	48	37	11
Main workers: Household industry workers	3	2	1
Main workers: Other	20	17	3
Marginal workers (total)	135	26	109
Marginal workers: Cultivators	86	12	74
Marginal workers: Agricultural labourers	44	11	33
Marginal workers: Household industry workers	1	0	1
Marginal workers: Others	4	3	1
Non-workers	526	197	329
