= Deharje =

Village in Maharashtra

- village
- Location in Maharashtra, India Deharje (India)
- Coordinates: 19.7725999°N 73.0553484°E
- Country: India
- State: Maharashtra
- District: Palghar
- Taluka: Vikramgad
- Elevation: 49 m (161 ft)

Population (2011)
  - Total: 2,276
- Time zone: UTC+5:30 (IST)
- 2011 census code: 551805

Deharje is a village in the Palghar district of Maharashtra, India. It is located in the Vikramgad taluka.

== Demographics ==
According to the 2011 census of India, Deharje has 450 households. The effective literacy rate (i.e. the literacy rate of population excluding children aged 6 and below) is 58.04%.

Demographics (2011 Census)
| | Total | Male | Female |
|---|---|---|---|
| Population | 2276 | 1121 | 1155 |
| Children aged below 6 years | 374 | 181 | 193 |
| Scheduled caste | 19 | 10 | 9 |
| Scheduled tribe | 2059 | 1012 | 1047 |
| Literates | 1104 | 624 | 480 |
| Workers (all) | 1185 | 667 | 518 |
| Main workers (total) | 1070 | 603 | 467 |
| Main workers: Cultivators | 456 | 262 | 194 |
| Main workers: Agricultural labourers | 455 | 247 | 208 |
| Main workers: Household industry workers | 2 | 0 | 2 |
| Main workers: Other | 157 | 94 | 63 |
| Marginal workers (total) | 115 | 64 | 51 |
| Marginal workers: Cultivators | 31 | 18 | 13 |
| Marginal workers: Agricultural labourers | 51 | 29 | 22 |
| Marginal workers: Household industry workers | 0 | 0 | 0 |
| Marginal workers: Others | 33 | 17 | 16 |
| Non-workers | 1091 | 454 | 637 |
