= Ambeghar Dharampur =

Village in Maharashtra

- village
- Location in Maharashtra, India Ambeghar Dharampur (India)
- Coordinates: 19.9451483°N 73.0228173°E
- Country: India
- State: Maharashtra
- District: Palghar
- Taluka: Vikramgad
- Elevation: 87 m (285 ft)

Population (2011)
  - Total: 921
- Time zone: UTC+5:30 (IST)
- 2011 census code: 551753

Ambeghar Dharampur is a village in the Palghar district of Maharashtra, India. It is located in the Vikramgad taluka.

== Demographics ==
According to the 2011 census of India, Ambeghar Dharampur has 185 households. The effective literacy rate (i.e. the literacy rate of population excluding children aged 6 and below) is 52.13%.

Demographics (2011 Census)
	Total	Male	Female
Population	921	413	508
Children aged below 6 years	171	78	93
Scheduled caste	0	0	0
Scheduled tribe	909	408	501
Literates	391	207	184
Workers (all)	523	225	298
Main workers (total)	225	201	24
Main workers: Cultivators	202	185	17
Main workers: Agricultural labourers	7	6	1
Main workers: Household industry workers	0	0	0
Main workers: Other	16	10	6
Marginal workers (total)	298	24	274
Marginal workers: Cultivators	263	13	250
Marginal workers: Agricultural labourers	17	1	16
Marginal workers: Household industry workers	1	1	0
Marginal workers: Others	17	9	8
Non-workers	398	188	210
