= Shil, Borande =

Village in Maharashtra

Shil
- village
- Location in Maharashtra, India Shil (India)
- Coordinates: 19.7583093°N 73.0715178°E
- Country: India
- State: Maharashtra
- District: Palghar
- Taluka: Vikramgad
- Elevation: 46 m (151 ft)

Population (2011)
  - Total: 697
- Time zone: UTC+5:30 (IST)
- 2011 census code: 551814

Shil is a village in the Palghar district of Maharashtra, India. It is located in the Vikramgad taluka. It comes under the administration of Borande panchayat.

== Demographics ==
According to the 2011 census of India, Shil has 125 households. The effective literacy rate (i.e. the literacy rate of population excluding children aged 6 and below) is 69.1%.

Demographics (2011 Census)
	Total	Male	Female
Population	697	340	357
Children aged below 6 years	108	60	48
Scheduled caste	0	0	0
Scheduled tribe	697	340	357
Literates	407	218	189
Workers (all)	607	290	317
Main workers (total)	605	289	316
Main workers: Cultivators	599	285	314
Main workers: Agricultural labourers	5	4	1
Main workers: Household industry workers	0	0	0
Main workers: Other	1	0	1
Marginal workers (total)	2	1	1
Marginal workers: Cultivators	1	0	1
Marginal workers: Agricultural labourers	1	1	0
Marginal workers: Household industry workers	0	0	0
Marginal workers: Others	0	0	0
Non-workers	90	50	40
