= Vittalnagar =

Village in Maharashtra

- village
- Location in Maharashtra, India Vittalnagar (India)
- Coordinates: 19.8877938°N 73.1143067°E
- Country: India
- State: Maharashtra
- District: Palghar
- Taluka: Vikramgad
- Elevation: 177 m (581 ft)

Population (2011)
  - Total: 959
- Time zone: UTC+5:30 (IST)
- 2011 census code: 551764

Vittalnagar is a village in the Palghar district of Maharashtra, India. It is located in the Vikramgad taluka.

== Demographics ==
According to the 2011 census of India, Vittalnagar has 217 households. The effective literacy rate (i.e. the literacy rate of population excluding children aged 6 and below) is 60.17%.

Demographics (2011 Census)
	Total	Male	Female
Population	959	472	487
Children aged below 6 years	128	72	56
Scheduled caste	0	0	0
Scheduled tribe	958	472	486
Literates	500	288	212
Workers (all)	554	283	271
Main workers (total)	390	248	142
Main workers: Cultivators	119	104	15
Main workers: Agricultural labourers	244	121	123
Main workers: Household industry workers	0	0	0
Main workers: Other	27	23	4
Marginal workers (total)	164	35	129
Marginal workers: Cultivators	61	15	46
Marginal workers: Agricultural labourers	100	20	80
Marginal workers: Household industry workers	3	0	3
Marginal workers: Others	0	0	0
Non-workers	405	189	216
