= Kondgaon, Vikramgad =

Village in Maharashtra

Kondgaon
- village
- Location in Maharashtra, India Kondgaon (India)
- Coordinates: 19.8175317°N 72.9844401°E
- Country: India
- State: Maharashtra
- District: Palghar
- Taluka: Vikramgad
- Elevation: 56 m (184 ft)

Population (2011)
  - Total: 2,049
- Time zone: UTC+5:30 (IST)
- 2011 census code: 551778

Kondgaon is a village in the Palghar district of Maharashtra, India. It is located in the Vikramgad taluka.

== Demographics ==
According to the 2011 census of India, Kondgaon has 388 households. The effective literacy rate (i.e. the literacy rate of population excluding children aged 6 and below) is 55.68%.

Demographics (2011 Census)
	Total	Male	Female
Population	2049	995	1054
Children aged below 6 years	395	196	199
Scheduled caste	0	0	0
Scheduled tribe	2005	974	1031
Literates	921	533	388
Workers (all)	1168	550	618
Main workers (total)	1081	517	564
Main workers: Cultivators	279	190	89
Main workers: Agricultural labourers	761	303	458
Main workers: Household industry workers	2	2	0
Main workers: Other	39	22	17
Marginal workers (total)	87	33	54
Marginal workers: Cultivators	12	6	6
Marginal workers: Agricultural labourers	61	24	37
Marginal workers: Household industry workers	1	0	1
Marginal workers: Others	13	3	10
Non-workers	881	445	436
