= Suksale =

Village in Maharashtra

- village
- Location in Maharashtra, India Suksale (India)
- Coordinates: 19.8004427°N 73.1161508°E
- Country: India
- State: Maharashtra
- District: Palghar
- Taluka: Vikramgad
- Elevation: 74 m (243 ft)

Population (2011)
  - Total: 1,385
- Time zone: UTC+5:30 (IST)
- 2011 census code: 551793

Suksale is a village in the Palghar district of Maharashtra, India. It is located in the Vikramgad taluka.

== Demographics ==
According to the 2011 census of India, Suksale has 277 households. The effective literacy rate (i.e. the literacy rate of population excluding children aged 6 and below) is 69.61%.

Demographics (2011 Census)
	Total	Male	Female
Population	1385	697	688
Children aged below 6 years	220	108	112
Scheduled caste	0	0	0
Scheduled tribe	1361	686	675
Literates	811	479	332
Workers (all)	689	352	337
Main workers (total)	644	330	314
Main workers: Cultivators	230	108	122
Main workers: Agricultural labourers	364	187	177
Main workers: Household industry workers	0	0	0
Main workers: Other	50	35	15
Marginal workers (total)	45	22	23
Marginal workers: Cultivators	2	2	0
Marginal workers: Agricultural labourers	37	17	20
Marginal workers: Household industry workers	0	0	0
Marginal workers: Others	6	3	3
Non-workers	696	345	351
