= Kasa Budruk =

Village in Maharashtra

Kasa Budruk Kasa Bk
- village
- Location in Maharashtra, India Kasa Budruk (India)
- Coordinates: 19.9128824°N 73.0464309°E
- Country: India
- State: Maharashtra
- District: Palghar
- Taluka: Vikramgad
- Elevation: 110 m (360 ft)

Population (2011)
  - Total: 2,116
- Time zone: UTC+5:30 (IST)
- 2011 census code: 551755

Kasa Budruk is a village in the Palghar district of Maharashtra, India. It is located in the Vikramgad taluka. In 2015, Krishna Kakdya Bij, a Warli tribal from the village helped exposed a MGNREGA scam.

== Demographics ==
According to the 2011 census of India, Kasa Budruk has 448 households. The effective literacy rate (i.e. the literacy rate of population excluding children aged 6 and below) is 60.08%.

Demographics (2011 Census)
	Total	Male	Female
Population	2116	1027	1089
Children aged below 6 years	400	218	182
Scheduled caste	0	0	0
Scheduled tribe	1957	939	1018
Literates	1031	582	449
Workers (all)	1250	593	657
Main workers (total)	793	394	399
Main workers: Cultivators	390	179	211
Main workers: Agricultural labourers	318	147	171
Main workers: Household industry workers	11	7	4
Main workers: Other	74	61	13
Marginal workers (total)	457	199	258
Marginal workers: Cultivators	377	157	220
Marginal workers: Agricultural labourers	29	12	17
Marginal workers: Household industry workers	1	0	1
Marginal workers: Others	50	30	20
Non-workers	866	434	432
