= Sawarai =

Village in Maharashtra

- village
- Location in Maharashtra, India Sawarai (India)
- Coordinates: 19.8757102°N 73.04908276°E
- Country: India
- State: Maharashtra
- District: Palghar
- Taluka: Vikramgad
- Elevation: 145 m (476 ft)

Population (2011)
  - Total: 565
- Time zone: UTC+5:30 (IST)
- 2011 census code: 551770

Sawarai is a village in the Palghar district of Maharashtra, India. It is located in the Vikramgad taluka.

== Demographics ==
According to the 2011 census of India, Sawarai has 119 households. The effective literacy rate (i.e. the literacy rate of population excluding children aged 6 and below) is 62.95%.

Demographics (2011 Census)
	Total	Male	Female
Population	565	293	272
Children aged below 6 years	125	67	58
Scheduled caste	0	0	0
Scheduled tribe	561	291	270
Literates	277	177	100
Workers (all)	338	162	176
Main workers (total)	332	158	174
Main workers: Cultivators	296	141	155
Main workers: Agricultural labourers	22	8	14
Main workers: Household industry workers	3	1	2
Main workers: Other	11	8	3
Marginal workers (total)	6	4	2
Marginal workers: Cultivators	1	1	0
Marginal workers: Agricultural labourers	5	3	2
Marginal workers: Household industry workers	0	0	0
Marginal workers: Others	0	0	0
Non-workers	227	131	96
