= Madacha Pada =

Village in Maharashtra

- village
- Location in Maharashtra, India Madacha Pada (India)
- Coordinates: 19.91622543°N 73.09397221°E
- Country: India
- State: Maharashtra
- District: Palghar
- Taluka: Vikramgad
- Elevation: 111 m (364 ft)

Population (2011)
  - Total: 652
- Time zone: UTC+5:30 (IST)
- 2011 census code: 551762

Madacha Pada is a village in the Palghar district of Maharashtra, India. It is located in the Vikramgad taluka.

== Demographics ==
According to the 2011 census of India, Madacha Pada has 133 households. The effective literacy rate (i.e. the literacy rate of population excluding children aged 6 and below) is 57.91%.

Demographics (2011 Census)
	Total	Male	Female
Population	652	319	333
Children aged below 6 years	96	50	46
Scheduled caste	0	0	0
Scheduled tribe	652	319	333
Literates	322	189	133
Workers (all)	417	196	221
Main workers (total)	376	176	200
Main workers: Cultivators	331	157	174
Main workers: Agricultural labourers	41	18	23
Main workers: Household industry workers	0	0	0
Main workers: Other	4	1	3
Marginal workers (total)	41	20	21
Marginal workers: Cultivators	32	14	18
Marginal workers: Agricultural labourers	5	4	1
Marginal workers: Household industry workers	0	0	0
Marginal workers: Others	4	2	2
Non-workers	235	123	112
