= Tembholi =

Village in Maharashtra

- village
- Location in Maharashtra, India Tembholi (India)
- Coordinates: 19.7898325°N 73.1666753°E
- Country: India
- State: Maharashtra
- District: Palghar
- Taluka: Vikramgad
- Elevation: 102 m (335 ft)

Population (2011)
  - Total: 430
- Time zone: UTC+5:30 (IST)
- 2011 census code: 551799

Tembholi is a village in the Palghar district of Maharashtra, India. It is located in the Vikramgad taluka.

== Demographics ==
According to the 2011 census of India, Tembholi has 99 households. The effective literacy rate (i.e. the literacy rate of population excluding children aged 6 and below) is 75.4%.

Demographics (2011 Census)
	Total	Male	Female
Population	430	225	205
Children aged below 6 years	56	26	30
Scheduled caste	0	0	0
Scheduled tribe	398	207	191
Literates	282	166	116
Workers (all)	241	128	113
Main workers (total)	104	59	45
Main workers: Cultivators	98	54	44
Main workers: Agricultural labourers	2	2	0
Main workers: Household industry workers	0	0	0
Main workers: Other	4	3	1
Marginal workers (total)	137	69	68
Marginal workers: Cultivators	97	51	46
Marginal workers: Agricultural labourers	37	18	19
Marginal workers: Household industry workers	0	0	0
Marginal workers: Others	3	0	3
Non-workers	189	97	92
