= Bhopoli =

Village in Maharashtra

- village
- Location in Maharashtra, India Bhopoli (India)
- Coordinates: 19.7663765°N 72.9878792°E
- Country: India
- State: Maharashtra
- District: Palghar
- Taluka: Vikramgad
- Elevation: 43 m (141 ft)

Population (2011)
  - Total: 1,454
- Time zone: UTC+5:30 (IST)
- 2011 census code: 551810

Bhopoli is a village in the Palghar district of Maharashtra, India. It is located in the Vikramgad taluka.

== Demographics ==
According to the 2011 census of India, Bhopoli has 251 households. The effective literacy rate (i.e. the literacy rate of population excluding children aged 6 and below) is 72.42%.

Demographics (2011 Census)
	Total	Male	Female
Population	1454	776	678
Children aged below 6 years	167	91	76
Scheduled caste	12	7	5
Scheduled tribe	1359	721	638
Literates	932	550	382
Workers (all)	499	349	150
Main workers (total)	485	345	140
Main workers: Cultivators	190	161	29
Main workers: Agricultural labourers	203	118	85
Main workers: Household industry workers	5	1	4
Main workers: Other	87	65	22
Marginal workers (total)	14	4	10
Marginal workers: Cultivators	2	1	1
Marginal workers: Agricultural labourers	7	0	7
Marginal workers: Household industry workers	1	0	1
Marginal workers: Others	4	3	1
Non-workers	955	427	528
