= Chari Budruk =

Village in Maharashtra

Chari Budruk Chari Bk.
- village
- Location in Maharashtra, India Chari Budruk (India)
- Coordinates: 19.7868566°N 73.0095336°E
- Country: India
- State: Maharashtra
- District: Palghar
- Taluka: Vikramgad
- Elevation: 52 m (171 ft)

Population (2011)
  - Total: 498
- Time zone: UTC+5:30 (IST)
- 2011 census code: 551783

Chari Budruk is a village in the Palghar district of Maharashtra, India. It is located in the Vikramgad taluka.

== Demographics ==
According to the 2011 census of India, Chari Budruk has 87 households. The effective literacy rate (i.e. the literacy rate of population excluding children aged 6 and below) is 63.74%.

Demographics (2011 Census)
| | Total | Male | Female |
|---|---|---|---|
| Population | 498 | 253 | 245 |
| Children aged below 6 years | 76 | 43 | 33 |
| Scheduled caste | 0 | 0 | 0 |
| Scheduled tribe | 493 | 250 | 243 |
| Literates | 269 | 154 | 115 |
| Workers (all) | 307 | 153 | 154 |
| Main workers (total) | 298 | 150 | 148 |
| Main workers: Cultivators | 274 | 139 | 135 |
| Main workers: Agricultural labourers | 16 | 7 | 9 |
| Main workers: Household industry workers | 4 | 2 | 2 |
| Main workers: Other | 4 | 2 | 2 |
| Marginal workers (total) | 9 | 3 | 6 |
| Marginal workers: Cultivators | 2 | 0 | 2 |
| Marginal workers: Agricultural labourers | 2 | 1 | 1 |
| Marginal workers: Household industry workers | 0 | 0 | 0 |
| Marginal workers: Others | 5 | 2 | 3 |
| Non-workers | 191 | 100 | 91 |
