= Talavali Tarf Dengachimet =

Village in Maharashtra

- village
- Location in Maharashtra, India Talavali Tarf Dengachimet (India)
- Coordinates: 19.9097016°N 73.1025036°E
- Country: India
- State: Maharashtra
- District: Palghar
- Taluka: Vikramgad
- Elevation: 113 m (371 ft)

Population (2011)
  - Total: 1,793
- Time zone: UTC+5:30 (IST)
- 2011 census code: 551760

Talavali Tarf Dengachimet is a village in the Palghar district of Maharashtra, India. It is located in the Vikramgad taluka.

== Demographics ==
According to the 2011 census of India, Talavali Tarf Dengachimet has 321 households. The effective literacy rate (i.e. the literacy rate of population excluding children aged 6 and below) is 56.88%.

Demographics (2011 Census)
	Total	Male	Female
Population	1793	876	917
Children aged below 6 years	332	172	160
Scheduled caste	0	0	0
Scheduled tribe	1697	825	872
Literates	831	479	352
Workers (all)	779	490	289
Main workers (total)	576	400	176
Main workers: Cultivators	148	123	25
Main workers: Agricultural labourers	351	206	145
Main workers: Household industry workers	1	1	0
Main workers: Other	76	70	6
Marginal workers (total)	203	90	113
Marginal workers: Cultivators	3	1	2
Marginal workers: Agricultural labourers	199	88	111
Marginal workers: Household industry workers	0	0	0
Marginal workers: Others	1	1	0
Non-workers	1014	386	628
