= Ghanode =

Village in Maharashtra

- village
- Location in Maharashtra, India Ghanode (India)
- Coordinates: 19.8031288°N 73.0139616°E
- Country: India
- State: Maharashtra
- District: Palghar
- Taluka: Vikramgad
- Elevation: 49 m (161 ft)

Population (2011)
  - Total: 791
- Time zone: UTC+5:30 (IST)
- 2011 census code: 551782

Ghanode is a village in the Palghar district of Maharashtra, India. It is located in the Vikramgad taluka.

== Demographics ==
According to the 2011 census of India, Ghanode has 127 households. The effective literacy rate (i.e. the literacy rate of population excluding children aged 6 and below) is 42.99%.

Demographics (2011 Census)
	Total	Male	Female
Population	791	409	382
Children aged below 6 years	142	76	66
Scheduled caste	1	1	0
Scheduled tribe	788	408	380
Literates	279	167	112
Workers (all)	478	237	241
Main workers (total)	464	233	231
Main workers: Cultivators	387	190	197
Main workers: Agricultural labourers	54	26	28
Main workers: Household industry workers	4	1	3
Main workers: Other	19	16	3
Marginal workers (total)	14	4	10
Marginal workers: Cultivators	0	0	0
Marginal workers: Agricultural labourers	2	0	2
Marginal workers: Household industry workers	10	3	7
Marginal workers: Others	2	1	1
Non-workers	313	172	141
