= Nagzari, Vikramgad =

Village in Maharashtra, India

Nagzari
- village
- Location in Maharashtra, India Nagzari (India)
- Coordinates: 19.7817735°N 72.8545019°E
- Country: India
- State: Maharashtra
- District: Palghar
- Taluka: Vikramgad
- Elevation: 15 m (49 ft)

Population (2011)
  - Total: 213
- Time zone: UTC+5:30 (IST)
- 2011 census code: 551790

Nagzari is a village in the Palghar district of Maharashtra, India. It is located in the Vikramgad taluka.

== Demographics ==
According to the 2011 census of India, Nagzari has 40 households. The effective literacy rate (i.e. the literacy rate of population excluding children aged 6 and below) is 92.78%.

Demographics (2011 Census)
	Total	Male	Female
Population	213	108	105
Children aged below 6 years	33	15	18
Scheduled caste	0	0	0
Scheduled tribe	208	105	103
Literates	167	89	78
Workers (all)	122	61	61
Main workers (total)	122	61	61
Main workers: Cultivators	34	16	18
Main workers: Agricultural labourers	82	40	42
Main workers: Household industry workers	0	0	0
Main workers: Other	6	5	1
Marginal workers (total)	0	0	0
Marginal workers: Cultivators	0	0	0
Marginal workers: Agricultural labourers	0	0	0
Marginal workers: Household industry workers	0	0	0
Marginal workers: Others	0	0	0
Non-workers	91	47	44
