= Tetawali =

Village in Maharashtra

- village
- Location in Maharashtra, India Tetawali (India)
- Coordinates: 19.7937544°N 73.0508582°E
- Country: India
- State: Maharashtra
- District: Palghar
- Taluka: Vikramgad
- Elevation: 53 m (174 ft)

Population (2011)
  - Total: 1,323
- Time zone: UTC+5:30 (IST)
- 2011 census code: 551806

Tetawali is a village in the Palghar district of Maharashtra, India. It is located in the Vikramgad taluka.

== Demographics ==
According to the 2011 census of India, Tetawali has 216 households. The effective literacy rate (i.e. the literacy rate of population excluding children aged 6 and below) is 65.4%.

Demographics (2011 Census)
	Total	Male	Female
Population	1323	709	614
Children aged below 6 years	187	98	89
Scheduled caste	0	0	0
Scheduled tribe	1313	701	612
Literates	743	475	268
Workers (all)	619	298	321
Main workers (total)	515	255	260
Main workers: Cultivators	381	189	192
Main workers: Agricultural labourers	116	52	64
Main workers: Household industry workers	0	0	0
Main workers: Other	18	14	4
Marginal workers (total)	104	43	61
Marginal workers: Cultivators	26	11	15
Marginal workers: Agricultural labourers	49	28	21
Marginal workers: Household industry workers	26	3	23
Marginal workers: Others	3	1	2
Non-workers	704	411	293
