= Apti Khurd =

Village in Maharashtra

Apti Khurd Apti Kh.
- village
- Location in Maharashtra, India Apti Khurd (India)
- Coordinates: 19.6857518°N 73.0770513°E
- Country: India
- State: Maharashtra
- District: Palghar
- Taluka: Vikramgad
- Elevation: 46 m (151 ft)

Population (2011)
  - Total: 460
- Time zone: UTC+5:30 (IST)
- 2011 census code: 551842

Apti Khurd is a village in the Palghar district of Maharashtra, India. It is located in the Vikramgad taluka.

== Demographics ==
According to the 2011 census of India, Apti Khurd has 112 households. The effective literacy rate (i.e. the literacy rate of population excluding children aged 6 and below) is 76.36%.

Demographics (2011 Census)
	Total	Male	Female
Population	460	224	236
Children aged below 6 years	75	30	45
Scheduled caste	0	0	0
Scheduled tribe	233	117	116
Literates	294	156	138
Workers (all)	267	142	125
Main workers (total)	71	61	10
Main workers: Cultivators	45	41	4
Main workers: Agricultural labourers	12	9	3
Main workers: Household industry workers	1	1	0
Main workers: Other	13	10	3
Marginal workers (total)	196	81	115
Marginal workers: Cultivators	86	24	62
Marginal workers: Agricultural labourers	107	54	53
Marginal workers: Household industry workers	0	0	0
Marginal workers: Others	3	3	0
Non-workers	193	82	111
