= Jambhe =

Village in Maharashtra

- village
- Location in Maharashtra, India Jambhe (India)
- Coordinates: 19.795267°N 73.1408613°E
- Country: India
- State: Maharashtra
- District: Palghar
- Taluka: Vikramgad
- Elevation: 117 m (384 ft)

Population (2011)
  - Total: 2,050
- Time zone: UTC+5:30 (IST)
- 2011 census code: 551794

Jambhe is a village in the Palghar district of Maharashtra, India. It is located in the Vikramgad taluka.

== Demographics ==
According to the 2011 census of India, Jambhe has 378 households. The effective literacy rate (i.e. the literacy rate of population excluding children aged 6 and below) is 52.95%.

Demographics (2011 Census)
	Total	Male	Female
Population	2050	1030	1020
Children aged below 6 years	424	234	190
Scheduled caste	4	3	1
Scheduled tribe	2042	1024	1018
Literates	861	491	370
Workers (all)	1181	579	602
Main workers (total)	559	270	289
Main workers: Cultivators	454	213	241
Main workers: Agricultural labourers	85	44	41
Main workers: Household industry workers	2	1	1
Main workers: Other	18	12	6
Marginal workers (total)	622	309	313
Marginal workers: Cultivators	72	50	22
Marginal workers: Agricultural labourers	543	253	290
Marginal workers: Household industry workers	1	1	0
Marginal workers: Others	6	5	1
Non-workers	869	451	418
