= Uparale =

Village in Maharashtra

- village
- Location in Maharashtra, India Uparale (India)
- Coordinates: 19.7990914°N 73.0316727°E
- Country: India
- State: Maharashtra
- District: Palghar
- Taluka: Vikramgad
- Elevation: 56 m (184 ft)

Population (2011)
  - Total: 1,489
- Time zone: UTC+5:30 (IST)
- 2011 census code: 551785

Uparale is a village in the Palghar district of Maharashtra, India. It is located in the Vikramgad taluka.

== Demographics ==
According to the 2011 census of India, Uparale has 273 households. The effective literacy rate (i.e. the literacy rate of population excluding children aged 6 and below) is 60.2%.

Demographics (2011 Census)
	Total	Male	Female
Population	1489	764	725
Children aged below 6 years	278	152	126
Scheduled caste	0	0	0
Scheduled tribe	1427	735	692
Literates	729	422	307
Workers (all)	859	423	436
Main workers (total)	495	253	242
Main workers: Cultivators	338	173	165
Main workers: Agricultural labourers	131	62	69
Main workers: Household industry workers	2	2	0
Main workers: Other	24	16	8
Marginal workers (total)	364	170	194
Marginal workers: Cultivators	228	104	124
Marginal workers: Agricultural labourers	133	64	69
Marginal workers: Household industry workers	1	0	1
Marginal workers: Others	2	2	0
Non-workers	630	341	289
