= Dolhari Khurd =

Village in Maharashtra

Dolhari Khurd Dolhari Kh.
- village
- Location in Maharashtra, India Dolhari Khurd (India)
- Coordinates: 19.8218384°N 73.0582368°E
- Country: India
- State: Maharashtra
- District: Palghar
- Taluka: Vikramgad
- Elevation: 65 m (213 ft)

Population (2011)
  - Total: 2,260
- Time zone: UTC+5:30 (IST)
- 2011 census code: 551787

Dolhari Khurd is a village in the Palghar district of Maharashtra, India. It is located in the Vikramgad taluka.

== Demographics ==
According to the 2011 census of India, Dolhari Khurd has 449 households. The effective literacy rate (i.e. the literacy rate of population excluding children aged 6 and below) is 60.55%.

Demographics (2011 Census)
	Total	Male	Female
Population	2260	1136	1124
Children aged below 6 years	379	205	174
Scheduled caste	0	0	0
Scheduled tribe	2250	1132	1118
Literates	1139	673	466
Workers (all)	1214	649	565
Main workers (total)	925	501	424
Main workers: Cultivators	729	387	342
Main workers: Agricultural labourers	157	89	68
Main workers: Household industry workers	4	3	1
Main workers: Other	35	22	13
Marginal workers (total)	289	148	141
Marginal workers: Cultivators	67	51	16
Marginal workers: Agricultural labourers	97	48	49
Marginal workers: Household industry workers	22	3	19
Marginal workers: Others	103	46	57
Non-workers	1046	487	559
