= Shil, Moho Budruk =

Village in Maharashtra

Shil
- village
- Location in Maharashtra, India Shil (India)
- Coordinates: 19.75806057°N 73.0710125°E
- Country: India
- State: Maharashtra
- District: Palghar
- Taluka: Vikramgad
- Elevation: 46 m (151 ft)

Population (2011)
  - Total: 1,165
- Time zone: UTC+5:30 (IST)
- 2011 census code: 551816

Shil is a village in the Palghar district of Maharashtra, India. It is located in the Vikramgad taluka. It comes under the administration of Moho Budruk panchayat.

== Demographics ==
According to the 2011 census of India, Shil has 267 households. The effective literacy rate (i.e. the literacy rate of population excluding children aged 6 and below) is 64.17%.

Demographics (2011 Census)
	Total	Male	Female
Population	1165	579	586
Children aged below 6 years	177	85	92
Scheduled caste	0	0	0
Scheduled tribe	909	448	461
Literates	634	361	273
Workers (all)	636	362	274
Main workers (total)	458	285	173
Main workers: Cultivators	97	72	25
Main workers: Agricultural labourers	188	106	82
Main workers: Household industry workers	6	4	2
Main workers: Other	167	103	64
Marginal workers (total)	178	77	101
Marginal workers: Cultivators	8	4	4
Marginal workers: Agricultural labourers	44	17	27
Marginal workers: Household industry workers	1	0	1
Marginal workers: Others	125	56	69
Non-workers	529	217	312
