= Karsud =

Village in Maharashtra

- village
- Location in Maharashtra, India Karsud (India)
- Coordinates: 19.8134993°N 73.0021534°E
- Country: India
- State: Maharashtra
- District: Palghar
- Taluka: Vikramgad
- Elevation: 54 m (177 ft)

Population (2011)
  - Total: 2,562
- Time zone: UTC+5:30 (IST)
- 2011 census code: 551781

Karsud is a village in the Palghar district of Maharashtra, India. It is located in the Vikramgad taluka.

== Demographics ==
According to the 2011 census of India, Karsud has 479 households. The effective literacy rate (i.e. the literacy rate of population excluding children aged 6 and below) is 49.7%.

Demographics (2011 Census)
	Total	Male	Female
Population	2562	1299	1263
Children aged below 6 years	423	227	196
Scheduled caste	0	0	0
Scheduled tribe	2518	1274	1244
Literates	1063	620	443
Workers (all)	1575	776	799
Main workers (total)	1159	556	603
Main workers: Cultivators	906	435	471
Main workers: Agricultural labourers	192	85	107
Main workers: Household industry workers	8	3	5
Main workers: Other	53	33	20
Marginal workers (total)	416	220	196
Marginal workers: Cultivators	72	35	37
Marginal workers: Agricultural labourers	250	124	126
Marginal workers: Household industry workers	5	0	5
Marginal workers: Others	89	61	28
Non-workers	987	523	464
