= Vedhe =

Village in Maharashtra

- village
- Location in Maharashtra, India Vedhe (India)
- Coordinates: 19.7846981°N 73.0021534°E
- Country: India
- State: Maharashtra
- District: Palghar
- Taluka: Vikramgad
- Elevation: 34 m (112 ft)

Population (2011)
  - Total: 870
- Time zone: UTC+5:30 (IST)
- 2011 census code: 551780

Vedhe is a village in the Palghar district of Maharashtra, India. It is located in the Vikramgad taluka.

== Demographics ==
According to the 2011 census of India, Vedhe has 160 households. The effective literacy rate (i.e. the literacy rate of population excluding children aged 6 and below) is 55.97%.

Demographics (2011 Census)
	Total	Male	Female
Population	870	428	442
Children aged below 6 years	175	83	92
Scheduled caste	0	0	0
Scheduled tribe	857	423	434
Literates	389	240	149
Workers (all)	477	223	254
Main workers (total)	435	201	234
Main workers: Cultivators	311	148	163
Main workers: Agricultural labourers	116	47	69
Main workers: Household industry workers	2	2	0
Main workers: Other	6	4	2
Marginal workers (total)	42	22	20
Marginal workers: Cultivators	34	16	18
Marginal workers: Agricultural labourers	4	3	1
Marginal workers: Household industry workers	0	0	0
Marginal workers: Others	4	3	1
Non-workers	393	205	188
