= Ambeghar (Balapur) =

Village in Maharashtra

- village
- Location in Maharashtra, India Ambeghar (Balapur) (India)
- Coordinates: 19.8231541°N 73.10229778°E
- Country: India
- State: Maharashtra
- District: Palghar
- Taluka: Vikramgad
- Elevation: 73 m (240 ft)

Population (2011)
  - Total: 1,174
- Time zone: UTC+5:30 (IST)
- Postal code: 401605
- Area code: 02520_____
- 2011 census code: 551767

Ambeghar (Balapur) is a village in the Palghar district of Maharashtra, India. It is located in the Vikramgad taluka.

The Ambeghar panchayat administers the following habitations: Ambeghar, Jadhavpada, Jambhulpada (5-gharpada), Tandelpada and Tumbadpada.

== Demographics ==
According to the 2011 census of India, Ambeghar (Balapur) has 276 households. The effective literacy rate (i.e. the literacy rate of population excluding children aged 6 and below) is 59.47%.

Demographics (2011 Census)
	Total	Male	Female
Population	1174	578	596
Children aged below 6 years	160	80	80
Scheduled caste	0	0	0
Scheduled tribe	1164	573	591
Literates	603	352	251
Workers (all)	778	373	405
Main workers (total)	762	368	394
Main workers: Cultivators	458	223	235
Main workers: Agricultural labourers	169	83	86
Main workers: Household industry workers	7	2	5
Main workers: Other	128	60	68
Marginal workers (total)	16	5	11
Marginal workers: Cultivators	0	0	0
Marginal workers: Agricultural labourers	9	4	5
Marginal workers: Household industry workers	4	0	4
Marginal workers: Others	3	1	2
Non-workers	396	205	191
