= Sakhare, Vikramgad =

Village in Maharashtra

Sakhare
- village
- Location in Maharashtra, India Sakhare (India)
- Coordinates: 19.8167044°N 73.1688878°E
- Country: India
- State: Maharashtra
- District: Palghar
- Taluka: Vikramgad
- Elevation: 128 m (420 ft)

Population (2011)
  - Total: 2,542
- Time zone: UTC+5:30 (IST)
- 2011 census code: 551797

Sakhare is a village in the Palghar district of Maharashtra, India. It is located in the Vikramgad taluka.

== Demographics ==
According to the 2011 census of India, Sakhare has 471 households. The effective literacy rate (i.e. the literacy rate of population excluding children aged 6 and below) is 71.45%.

Demographics (2011 Census)
	Total	Male	Female
Population	2542	1255	1287
Children aged below 6 years	311	159	152
Scheduled caste	2	1	1
Scheduled tribe	2472	1221	1251
Literates	1594	866	728
Workers (all)	1228	625	603
Main workers (total)	1012	587	425
Main workers: Cultivators	576	352	224
Main workers: Agricultural labourers	365	178	187
Main workers: Household industry workers	16	13	3
Main workers: Other	55	44	11
Marginal workers (total)	216	38	178
Marginal workers: Cultivators	45	7	38
Marginal workers: Agricultural labourers	162	25	137
Marginal workers: Household industry workers	1	0	1
Marginal workers: Others	8	6	2
Non-workers	1314	630	684
