= Karhe =

Village in Maharashtra

Karhe karhe
- village
- Location in Maharashtra, India Karhe (India)
- Coordinates: 19.907243°N 73.1216833°E
- Country: India
- State: Maharashtra
- District: Palghar
- Taluka: Vikramgad
- Elevation: 150 m (490 ft)

Population (2011)
  - Total: 1,378
- Time zone: UTC+5:30 (IST)
- 2011 census code: 551761

Karhe is a village in the Palghar district of Maharashtra, India. It is located in the Vikramgad taluka.

== Demographics ==
According to the 2011 census of India, Karhe has 192 households. The effective literacy rate (i.e. the literacy rate of population excluding children aged 6 and below) is 67.85%.

Demographics (2011 Census)
	Total	Male	Female
Population	1378	692	686
Children aged below 6 years	196	99	97
Scheduled caste	2	2	0
Scheduled tribe	1363	685	678
Literates	802	440	362
Workers (all)	560	266	294
Main workers (total)	395	232	163
Main workers: Cultivators	278	173	105
Main workers: Agricultural labourers	88	41	47
Main workers: Household industry workers	0	0	0
Main workers: Other	29	18	11
Marginal workers (total)	165	34	131
Marginal workers: Cultivators	82	10	72
Marginal workers: Agricultural labourers	56	15	41
Marginal workers: Household industry workers	1	0	1
Marginal workers: Others	26	9	17
Non-workers	818	426	392
