= Pochade, Vikramgad =

Village in Maharashtra

Pochade
- village
- Location in Maharashtra, India Pochade (India)
- Coordinates: 19.78479575°N 73.15933228°E
- Country: India
- State: Maharashtra
- District: Palghar
- Taluka: Vikramgad
- Elevation: 100 m (330 ft)

Population (2011)
  - Total: 1,046
- Time zone: UTC+5:30 (IST)
- 2011 census code: 551800

Pochade is a village in the Palghar district of Maharashtra, India. It is located in the Vikramgad taluka.

== Demographics ==
According to the 2011 census of India, Pochade has 226 households. The effective literacy rate (i.e. the literacy rate of population excluding children aged 6 and below) is 66%.

Demographics (2011 Census)
	Total	Male	Female
Population	1046	526	520
Children aged below 6 years	149	76	73
Scheduled caste	2	1	1
Scheduled tribe	1030	520	510
Literates	592	344	248
Workers (all)	582	291	291
Main workers (total)	540	268	272
Main workers: Cultivators	231	112	119
Main workers: Agricultural labourers	277	134	143
Main workers: Household industry workers	3	2	1
Main workers: Other	29	20	9
Marginal workers (total)	42	23	19
Marginal workers: Cultivators	5	4	1
Marginal workers: Agricultural labourers	17	9	8
Marginal workers: Household industry workers	0	0	0
Marginal workers: Others	20	10	10
Non-workers	464	235	229
