= Wehelpada =

Village in Maharashtra

- village
- Location in Maharashtra, India Wehelpada (India)
- Coordinates: 19.8621438°N 73.1172573°E
- Country: India
- State: Maharashtra
- District: Palghar
- Taluka: Vikramgad
- Elevation: 102 m (335 ft)

Population (2011)
  - Total: 2,459
- Time zone: UTC+5:30 (IST)
- 2011 census code: 551765

Wehelpada is a village in the Palghar district of Maharashtra, India. It is located in the Vikramgad taluka.

== Demographics ==
According to the 2011 census of India, Wehelpada has 452 households. The effective literacy rate (i.e. the literacy rate of population excluding children aged 6 and below) is 52.5%.

Demographics (2011 Census)
	Total	Male	Female
Population	2459	1205	1254
Children aged below 6 years	539	277	262
Scheduled caste	0	0	0
Scheduled tribe	2458	1204	1254
Literates	1008	573	435
Workers (all)	1327	671	656
Main workers (total)	1130	588	542
Main workers: Cultivators	397	204	193
Main workers: Agricultural labourers	712	372	340
Main workers: Household industry workers	5	3	2
Main workers: Other	16	9	7
Marginal workers (total)	197	83	114
Marginal workers: Cultivators	74	40	34
Marginal workers: Agricultural labourers	112	34	78
Marginal workers: Household industry workers	1	1	0
Marginal workers: Others	10	8	2
Non-workers	1132	534	598
