= Khuded =

Village in Maharashtra

- village
- Location in Maharashtra, India Khuded (India)
- Coordinates: 19.8425169°N 73.1526623°E
- Country: India
- State: Maharashtra
- District: Palghar
- Taluka: Vikramgad
- Elevation: 129 m (423 ft)

Population (2011)
  - Total: 1,994
- Time zone: UTC+5:30 (IST)
- 2011 census code: 551795

Khuded is a village in the Palghar district of Maharashtra, India. It is located in the Vikramgad taluka.

== Demographics ==
According to the 2011 census of India, Khuded has 436 households. The effective literacy rate (i.e. the literacy rate of population excluding children aged 6 and below) is 60.65%.

Demographics (2011 Census)
	Total	Male	Female
Population	1994	971	1023
Children aged below 6 years	365	178	187
Scheduled caste	0	0	0
Scheduled tribe	1986	967	1019
Literates	988	545	443
Workers (all)	1148	562	586
Main workers (total)	534	261	273
Main workers: Cultivators	157	132	25
Main workers: Agricultural labourers	333	97	236
Main workers: Household industry workers	8	5	3
Main workers: Other	36	27	9
Marginal workers (total)	614	301	313
Marginal workers: Cultivators	509	244	265
Marginal workers: Agricultural labourers	80	41	39
Marginal workers: Household industry workers	11	7	4
Marginal workers: Others	14	9	5
Non-workers	846	409	437
