= Bangarchole =

Village in Maharashtra

- village
- Location in Maharashtra, India Bangarchole (India)
- Coordinates: 19.7541752°N 72.9844401°E
- Country: India
- State: Maharashtra
- District: Palghar
- Taluka: Vikramgad
- Elevation: 51 m (167 ft)

Population (2011)
  - Total: 459
- Time zone: UTC+5:30 (IST)
- 2011 census code: 551813

Bangarchole is a village in the Palghar district of Maharashtra, India. It is located in the Vikramgad taluka.

== Demographics ==
According to the 2011 census of India, Bangarchole has 98 households. The effective literacy rate (i.e. the literacy rate of population excluding children aged 6 and below) is 66.84%.

Demographics (2011 Census)
	Total	Male	Female
Population	459	222	237
Children aged below 6 years	79	30	49
Scheduled caste	0	0	0
Scheduled tribe	448	217	231
Literates	254	151	103
Workers (all)	270	137	133
Main workers (total)	267	135	132
Main workers: Cultivators	30	15	15
Main workers: Agricultural labourers	221	109	112
Main workers: Household industry workers	0	0	0
Main workers: Other	16	11	5
Marginal workers (total)	3	2	1
Marginal workers: Cultivators	1	0	1
Marginal workers: Agricultural labourers	2	2	0
Marginal workers: Household industry workers	0	0	0
Marginal workers: Others	0	0	0
Non-workers	189	85	104
