= Satkor =

Village in Maharashtra

- village
- Location in Maharashtra, India Satkor (India)
- Coordinates: 19.8169488°N 73.0375761°E
- Country: India
- State: Maharashtra
- District: Palghar
- Taluka: Vikramgad
- Elevation: 59 m (194 ft)

Population (2011)
  - Total: 1,464
- Time zone: UTC+5:30 (IST)
- 2011 census code: 551786

Satkor is a village in the Palghar district of Maharashtra, India. It is located in the Vikramgad taluka.

== Demographics ==
According to the 2011 census of India, Satkor has 278 households. The effective literacy rate (i.e. the literacy rate of population excluding children aged 6 and below) is 69.88%.

Demographics (2011 Census)
	Total	Male	Female
Population	1464	709	755
Children aged below 6 years	239	125	114
Scheduled caste	0	0	0
Scheduled tribe	1457	705	752
Literates	856	493	363
Workers (all)	898	431	467
Main workers (total)	605	313	292
Main workers: Cultivators	320	166	154
Main workers: Agricultural labourers	219	113	106
Main workers: Household industry workers	26	11	15
Main workers: Other	40	23	17
Marginal workers (total)	293	118	175
Marginal workers: Cultivators	105	30	75
Marginal workers: Agricultural labourers	121	44	77
Marginal workers: Household industry workers	18	5	13
Marginal workers: Others	49	39	10
Non-workers	566	278	288
