= Ghaneghar =

Village in Maharashtra, India

- village
- Location in Maharashtra, India Ghaneghar (India)
- Coordinates: 19.7895959°N 72.9637728°E
- Country: India
- State: Maharashtra
- District: Palghar
- Taluka: Vikramgad
- Elevation: 80 m (260 ft)

Population (2011)
  - Total: 1,056
- Time zone: UTC+5:30 (IST)
- 2011 census code: 551811

Ghaneghar is a village in the Palghar district of Maharashtra, India. It is located in the Vikramgad taluka.

== Demographics ==
According to the 2011 census of India, Ghaneghar has 218 households. The effective literacy rate (i.e. the literacy rate of population excluding children aged 6 and below) is 54.1%.

Demographics (2011 Census)
| | Total | Male | Female |
|---|---|---|---|
| Population | 1056 | 489 | 567 |
| Children aged below 6 years | 215 | 104 | 111 |
| Scheduled caste | 0 | 0 | 0 |
| Scheduled tribe | 1056 | 489 | 567 |
| Literates | 455 | 244 | 211 |
| Workers (all) | 620 | 292 | 328 |
| Main workers (total) | 570 | 283 | 287 |
| Main workers: Cultivators | 212 | 103 | 109 |
| Main workers: Agricultural labourers | 341 | 169 | 172 |
| Main workers: Household industry workers | 0 | 0 | 0 |
| Main workers: Other | 17 | 11 | 6 |
| Marginal workers (total) | 50 | 9 | 41 |
| Marginal workers: Cultivators | 7 | 2 | 5 |
| Marginal workers: Agricultural labourers | 39 | 6 | 33 |
| Marginal workers: Household industry workers | 0 | 0 | 0 |
| Marginal workers: Others | 4 | 1 | 3 |
| Non-workers | 436 | 197 | 239 |
