= Kashivali Tarf Alonde =

Village in Maharashtra

- village
- Location in Maharashtra, India Kashivali Tarf Alonde (India)
- Coordinates: 19.6830367°N 73.0899622°E
- Country: India
- State: Maharashtra
- District: Palghar
- Taluka: Vikramgad
- Elevation: 39 m (128 ft)

Population (2011)
  - Total: 455
- Time zone: UTC+5:30 (IST)
- 2011 census code: 551843

Kashivali Tarf Alonde is a village in the Palghar district of Maharashtra, India. It is located in the Vikramgad taluka. The village has one main road, Male Road.

== Demographics ==
According to the 2011 census of India, Kashivali Tarf Alonde has 100 households. The effective literacy rate (i.e. the literacy rate of population excluding children aged 6 and below) is 72.42%.

Demographics (2011 Census)
	Total	Male	Female
Population	455	232	223
Children aged below 6 years	67	27	40
Scheduled caste	0	0	0
Scheduled tribe	294	147	147
Literates	281	164	117
Workers (all)	274	144	130
Main workers (total)	68	38	30
Main workers: Cultivators	44	20	24
Main workers: Agricultural labourers	13	9	4
Main workers: Household industry workers	0	0	0
Main workers: Other	11	9	2
Marginal workers (total)	206	106	100
Marginal workers: Cultivators	64	27	37
Marginal workers: Agricultural labourers	135	74	61
Marginal workers: Household industry workers	1	0	1
Marginal workers: Others	6	5	1
Non-workers	181	88	93
