= Chandranagar, Vikramgad =

Village in Maharashtra, India

Chandranagar
- village
- Location in Maharashtra, India Chandranagar (India)
- Coordinates: 19.8428782°N 73.0080576°E
- Country: India
- State: Maharashtra
- District: Palghar
- Taluka: Vikramgad
- Elevation: 120 m (390 ft)

Population (2011)
  - Total: 1,325
- Time zone: UTC+5:30 (IST)
- 2011 census code: 551776

Chandranagar is a village in the Palghar district of Maharashtra, India. It is located in the Vikramgad taluka.

== Demographics ==
According to the 2011 census of India, Chandranagar has 260 households. The effective literacy rate (i.e. the literacy rate of population excluding children aged 6 and below) is 38.95%.

Demographics (2011 Census)
	Total	Male	Female
Population	1325	655	670
Children aged below 6 years	262	132	130
Scheduled caste	0	0	0
Scheduled tribe	1321	653	668
Literates	414	256	158
Workers (all)	702	343	359
Main workers (total)	515	332	183
Main workers: Cultivators	374	222	152
Main workers: Agricultural labourers	120	97	23
Main workers: Household industry workers	5	3	2
Main workers: Other	16	10	6
Marginal workers (total)	187	11	176
Marginal workers: Cultivators	8	4	4
Marginal workers: Agricultural labourers	177	6	171
Marginal workers: Household industry workers	0	0	0
Marginal workers: Others	2	1	1
Non-workers	623	312	311
