= Kunj =

Village in Maharashtra

- village
- Location in Maharashtra, India Kunj (India)
- Coordinates: 19.905°N 73.029°E
- Country: India
- State: Maharashtra
- District: Palghar
- Taluka: Vikramgad
- Elevation: 147 m (482 ft)

Population (2011)
  - Total: 2,189
- Time zone: UTC+5:30 (IST)
- 2011 census code: 551759

Kunj is a village in the Palghar district of Maharashtra, India. It is located in the Vikramgad taluka.

== Demographics ==
According to the 2011 census of India, Kunj has 455 households. The effective literacy rate (i.e. the literacy rate of population excluding children aged 6 and below) is 56.61%.

Demographics (2011 Census)
	Total	Male	Female
Population	2189	1064	1125
Children aged below 6 years	366	202	164
Scheduled caste	0	0	0
Scheduled tribe	2167	1053	1114
Literates	1032	552	480
Workers (all)	1199	607	592
Main workers (total)	864	532	332
Main workers: Cultivators	331	216	115
Main workers: Agricultural labourers	420	244	176
Main workers: Household industry workers	2	1	1
Main workers: Other	111	71	40
Marginal workers (total)	335	75	260
Marginal workers: Cultivators	104	27	77
Marginal workers: Agricultural labourers	231	48	183
Marginal workers: Household industry workers	0	0	0
Marginal workers: Others	0	0	0
Non-workers	990	457	533
