= Kawadas =

Village in Maharashtra

- village
- Location in Maharashtra, India Kawadas (India)
- Coordinates: 19.9160401°N 72.9903447°E
- Country: India
- State: Maharashtra
- District: Palghar
- Taluka: Vikramgad
- Elevation: 69 m (226 ft)

Population (2011)
  - Total: 644
- Time zone: UTC+5:30 (IST)
- 2011 census code: 551752

Kawadas is a village in the Palghar district of Maharashtra, India. It is located in the Vikramgad taluka.

== Demographics ==
According to the 2011 census of India, Kawadas has 134 households. The effective literacy rate (i.e. the literacy rate of population excluding children aged 6 and below) is 61.16%.

Demographics (2011 Census)
	Total	Male	Female
Population	644	320	324
Children aged below 6 years	111	63	48
Scheduled caste	14	8	6
Scheduled tribe	612	304	308
Literates	326	193	133
Workers (all)	373	177	196
Main workers (total)	245	117	128
Main workers: Cultivators	139	73	66
Main workers: Agricultural labourers	48	21	27
Main workers: Household industry workers	27	1	26
Main workers: Other	31	22	9
Marginal workers (total)	128	60	68
Marginal workers: Cultivators	61	29	32
Marginal workers: Agricultural labourers	47	26	21
Marginal workers: Household industry workers	13	3	10
Marginal workers: Others	7	2	5
Non-workers	271	143	128
