= Vilshet =

Village in Maharashtra

- village
- Location in Maharashtra, India Vilshet (India)
- Coordinates: 19.8278982°N 72.9726305°E
- Country: India
- State: Maharashtra
- District: Palghar
- Taluka: Vikramgad
- Elevation: 57 m (187 ft)

Population (2011)
  - Total: 1,052
- Time zone: UTC+5:30 (IST)
- 2011 census code: 551777

Vilshet is a village in the Palghar district of Maharashtra, India. It is located in the Vikramgad taluka.

== Demographics ==
According to the 2011 census of India, Vilshet has 202 households. The effective literacy rate (i.e. the literacy rate of population excluding children aged 6 and below) is 53.86%.

Demographics (2011 Census)
	Total	Male	Female
Population	1052	511	541
Children aged below 6 years	211	107	104
Scheduled caste	0	0	0
Scheduled tribe	1046	507	539
Literates	453	252	201
Workers (all)	643	310	333
Main workers (total)	639	308	331
Main workers: Cultivators	191	174	17
Main workers: Agricultural labourers	435	124	311
Main workers: Household industry workers	1	0	1
Main workers: Other	12	10	2
Marginal workers (total)	4	2	2
Marginal workers: Cultivators	1	0	1
Marginal workers: Agricultural labourers	1	0	1
Marginal workers: Household industry workers	0	0	0
Marginal workers: Others	2	2	0
Non-workers	409	201	208
