= Sarshi =

Village in Maharashtra, India

- village
- Location in Maharashtra, India Sarshi (India)
- Coordinates: 19.899052°N 73.0228173°E
- Country: India
- State: Maharashtra
- District: Palghar
- Taluka: Vikramgad
- Elevation: 88 m (289 ft)

Population (2011)
  - Total: 3,025
- Time zone: UTC+5:30 (IST)
- 2011 census code: 551756

Sarshi is a village in the Palghar district of Maharashtra, India. It is located in the Vikramgad taluka.

== Demographics ==
According to the 2011 census of India, Sarshi has 569 households. The effective literacy rate (i.e. the literacy rate of population excluding children aged 6 and below) is 51.77%.

Demographics (2011 Census)
	Total	Male	Female
Population	3025	1452	1573
Children aged below 6 years	595	285	310
Scheduled caste	0	0	0
Scheduled tribe	2985	1437	1548
Literates	1258	698	560
Workers (all)	1588	783	805
Main workers (total)	1582	782	800
Main workers: Cultivators	957	499	458
Main workers: Agricultural labourers	555	238	317
Main workers: Household industry workers	3	1	2
Main workers: Other	67	44	23
Marginal workers (total)	6	1	5
Marginal workers: Cultivators	2	1	1
Marginal workers: Agricultural labourers	1	0	1
Marginal workers: Household industry workers	1	0	1
Marginal workers: Others	2	0	2
Non-workers	1437	669	768
