= Dhamani =

Village in Maharashtra, India

- village
- Location in Maharashtra, India Dhamani (India)
- Coordinates: 19.93575297°N 73.04650784°E
- Country: India
- State: Maharashtra
- District: Palghar
- Taluka: Vikramgad
- Elevation: 124 m (407 ft)

Population (2011)
  - Total: 1,323
- Time zone: UTC+5:30 (IST)
- 2011 census code: 551754

Dhamani is a village in the Palghar district of Maharashtra, India. It is located in the Vikramgad taluka.

== Demographics ==
According to the 2011 census of India, Dhamani has 255 households. The effective literacy rate (i.e. the literacy rate of population excluding children aged 6 and below) is 52.84%.

Demographics (2011 Census)
	Total	Male	Female
Population	1323	670	653
Children aged below 6 years	231	134	97
Scheduled caste	0	0	0
Scheduled tribe	1320	668	652
Literates	577	325	252
Workers (all)	791	407	384
Main workers (total)	293	159	134
Main workers: Cultivators	68	42	26
Main workers: Agricultural labourers	193	99	94
Main workers: Household industry workers	2	2	0
Main workers: Other	30	16	14
Marginal workers (total)	498	248	250
Marginal workers: Cultivators	234	118	116
Marginal workers: Agricultural labourers	234	117	117
Marginal workers: Household industry workers	4	2	2
Marginal workers: Others	26	11	15
Non-workers	532	263	269
