= Apti Budruk =

Village in Maharashtra

Apti Budruk Apti Bk.
- village
- Location in Maharashtra, India Apti Budruk (India)
- Coordinates: 19.7864218°N 73.0198654°E
- Country: India
- State: Maharashtra
- District: Palghar
- Taluka: Vikramgad
- Elevation: 52 m (171 ft)

Population (2011)
  - Total: 1,343
- Time zone: UTC+5:30 (IST)
- 2011 census code: 551784

Apti Budruk is a village in the Palghar district of Maharashtra, India. It is located in the Vikramgad taluka.

== Demographics ==
According to the 2011 census of India, Apti Budruk has 249 households. The effective literacy rate (i.e. the literacy rate of population excluding children aged 6 and below) is 57.54%.

Demographics (2011 Census)
	Total	Male	Female
Population	1343	668	675
Children aged below 6 years	269	130	139
Scheduled caste	0	0	0
Scheduled tribe	1321	660	661
Literates	618	363	255
Workers (all)	782	384	398
Main workers (total)	718	348	370
Main workers: Cultivators	119	60	59
Main workers: Agricultural labourers	482	228	254
Main workers: Household industry workers	1	0	1
Main workers: Other	116	60	56
Marginal workers (total)	64	36	28
Marginal workers: Cultivators	4	1	3
Marginal workers: Agricultural labourers	50	29	21
Marginal workers: Household industry workers	0	0	0
Marginal workers: Others	10	6	4
Non-workers	561	284	277
