= Borande =

Village in Maharashtra

Borande Boranda
- village
- Location in Maharashtra, India Borande (India)
- Coordinates: 19.7569129°N 72.9682017°E
- Country: India
- State: Maharashtra
- District: Palghar
- Taluka: Vikramgad
- Elevation: 35 m (115 ft)

Population (2011)
  - Total: 2,043
- Time zone: UTC+5:30 (IST)
- 2011 census code: 551812

Borande is a village in the Palghar district of Maharashtra, India. It is located in the Vikramgad taluka.

== Demographics ==
According to the 2011 census of India, Borande has 404 households. The effective literacy rate (i.e. the literacy rate of population excluding children aged 6 and below) is 65.89%.

Demographics (2011 Census)
	Total	Male	Female
Population	2043	1022	1021
Children aged below 6 years	334	165	169
Scheduled caste	0	0	0
Scheduled tribe	2024	1006	1018
Literates	1126	663	463
Workers (all)	1348	691	657
Main workers (total)	1097	572	525
Main workers: Cultivators	607	303	304
Main workers: Agricultural labourers	399	210	189
Main workers: Household industry workers	2	1	1
Main workers: Other	89	58	31
Marginal workers (total)	251	119	132
Marginal workers: Cultivators	5	3	2
Marginal workers: Agricultural labourers	230	114	116
Marginal workers: Household industry workers	6	1	5
Marginal workers: Others	10	1	9
Non-workers	695	331	364
