= Moho Budruk =

Village in Maharashtra, India

Moho Budrak
- Location within India
- Location: Nasik District, Maharashtra, India
- Nearest city: Mumbai
- Coordinates: 20°05′35″N 75°10′14.7″E
- Area: 6,352.23 ha (15,696.7 acres)
- Established: 1895

Moho Budrak is a village in Nasik district, Maharashtra, India. It depends on agriculture. A small number of people live in the village. Half of them are workers.

The terrain is sandy.

== See also ==
- Maharashtra
- Nashik
- Western Ghats
