= Vikramgad =

Vikramgad or Junjhargad Kudan
- Town
- Interactive map of Vikramgad or Junjhargad
- Country: India
- State: Maharashtra
- District: Palghar

Population
  - Total: 5,991

Languages
  - Official: Marathi
- Time zone: UTC+5:30 (IST)
- PIN: 401605
- ISO 3166 code: IN-MH
- Vehicle registration: MH-48
- Nearest city: Palghar
- Literacy: 82.77%
- Lok Sabha constituency: Palghar
- Vidhan Sabha constituency: Vikramgad

Vikramgad is a census town in Jawhar subdivision of Palghar district of Maharashtra state in Konkan division.

In Vikramgad, Nature Trail is a well known weekend picnic spot. Vikramgad can be accessed from Wada, Jawhar, and Palghar. Vikramgad is a taluka. It is famous for its Weekly Bazaar (Budhwar Bazar) on Wednesdays. People travel by private vehicle or use the bus service.

== Demographics ==
In 2011, Vikramgad had a population of 5,991.

Literacy levels were at 82.77%, higher than the national average. 95.79% of the population are Hindu and 3.12% are Muslim.

The working population of Vikramgad consists of 2,278 people. 73.44% of these people engaged in main work and 26.56% engaged in marginal work.

== Education ==
Vikramgad tehsil has two colleges:

- Onde Village Arts Commerce and Science College opened in 2002 and offers a Bachelor of Arts and a Bachelor of Science
- Government Polytechnic opened in 2011 and offers Diplomas in Engineering.
