= Chikhloli railway station =

Railway Station in Maharashtra, India

Chikhloli Railway Station चिखलोली रेल्वे स्थानक

General information
- Coordinates: 19.186°N 73.215°E
- System: Indian Railways and Mumbai Suburban Railway station
- Owner: Ministry of Railways, Indian Railways
- Line: Central Line

Construction
- Structure type: At-grade

Other information
- Status: Under construction
- Station code: CHLI
- Fare zone: Central Railways
Route map
Location
- Location within India Location within Maharashtra

Chikhloli railway station (station code: CHLI) is an upcoming railway station on the Central line of the Mumbai Suburban Railway network. It will be located on the route between Ambarnath railway station and Badlapur railway station in the village of Chikhloli.

== Development ==
The station is being constructed as part of the Mumbai Urban Transport Project 3A (MUTP 3A), which aims to enhance suburban rail infrastructure. The project is being executed by Mumbai Railway Vikas Corporation.

The station is likely to be completed by 2027, however it is being developed in conjunction with the railway line expansion to 4 tracks between Kalyan and Badlapur. The new platforms at Chikhloli are being built to serve the brand-new railway line tracks that will come up as part of the quadrupling work. This means that even if the station structure is completed earlier, train services cannot begin until the new tracks are laid and commissioned.

The project is being estimated to cost ₹1510 crore.
