= Merha =

Merha is a village in Badlapur, Jaunpur district, Varanasi division, Uttar Pradesh, India.
