= Ulhasnagar railway station =

Railway Station in Maharashtra, India

Ulhasnagar Railway Station उल्हासनगर रेल्वे स्थानक
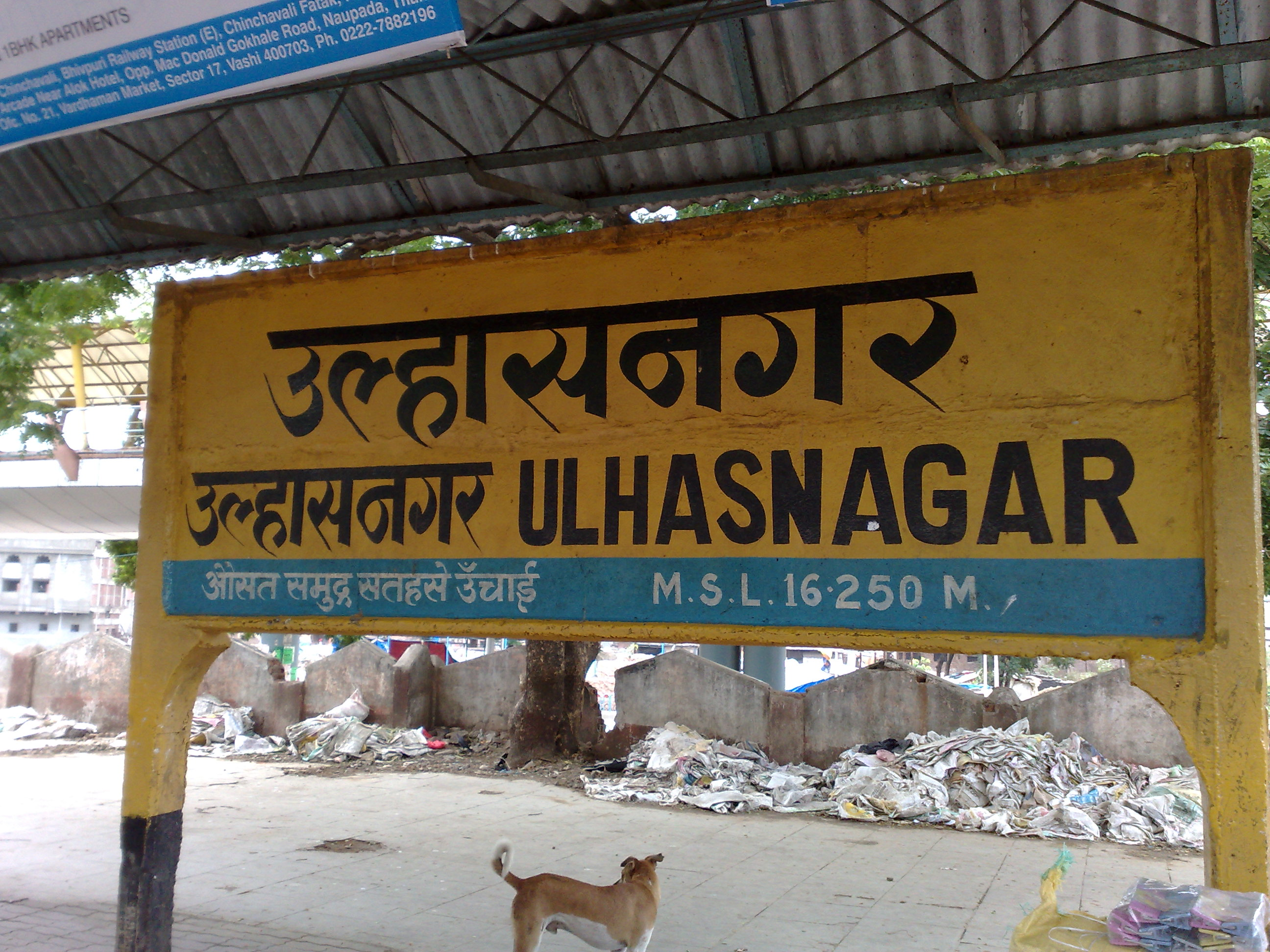

General information
- Coordinates: 19.22°N 73.15°E
- Elevation: 16.250 metres (53.31 ft)
- System: Indian Railways and Mumbai Suburban Railway station
- Owner: Ministry of Railways, Indian Railways
- Line: Central Line
- Platforms: 2
- Tracks: 2

Construction
- Structure type: Standard, on ground
- Parking: Yes

Other information
- Status: Active
- Station code: ULNR
- Fare zone: Central Railways

History
- Opened: 7 January 1957

Services
Preceding station	Mumbai Suburban Railway	Following station
Vithalwadi towards Chhatrapati Shivaji Terminus	Central line	Ambernath towards Khopoli
Route map
Location
- Location within Maharashtra

Ulhasnagar railway station (station code: ULNR) is an important railway station on the Central line of the Mumbai Suburban Railway network. It is a station for all Slow, Semifast, and Fast trains on the Mumbai Suburban Railway system. It is located on the route between Vithalwadi and Ambarnath. Ulhasnagar Railway Station was built in the year 1957.

== Gallery ==
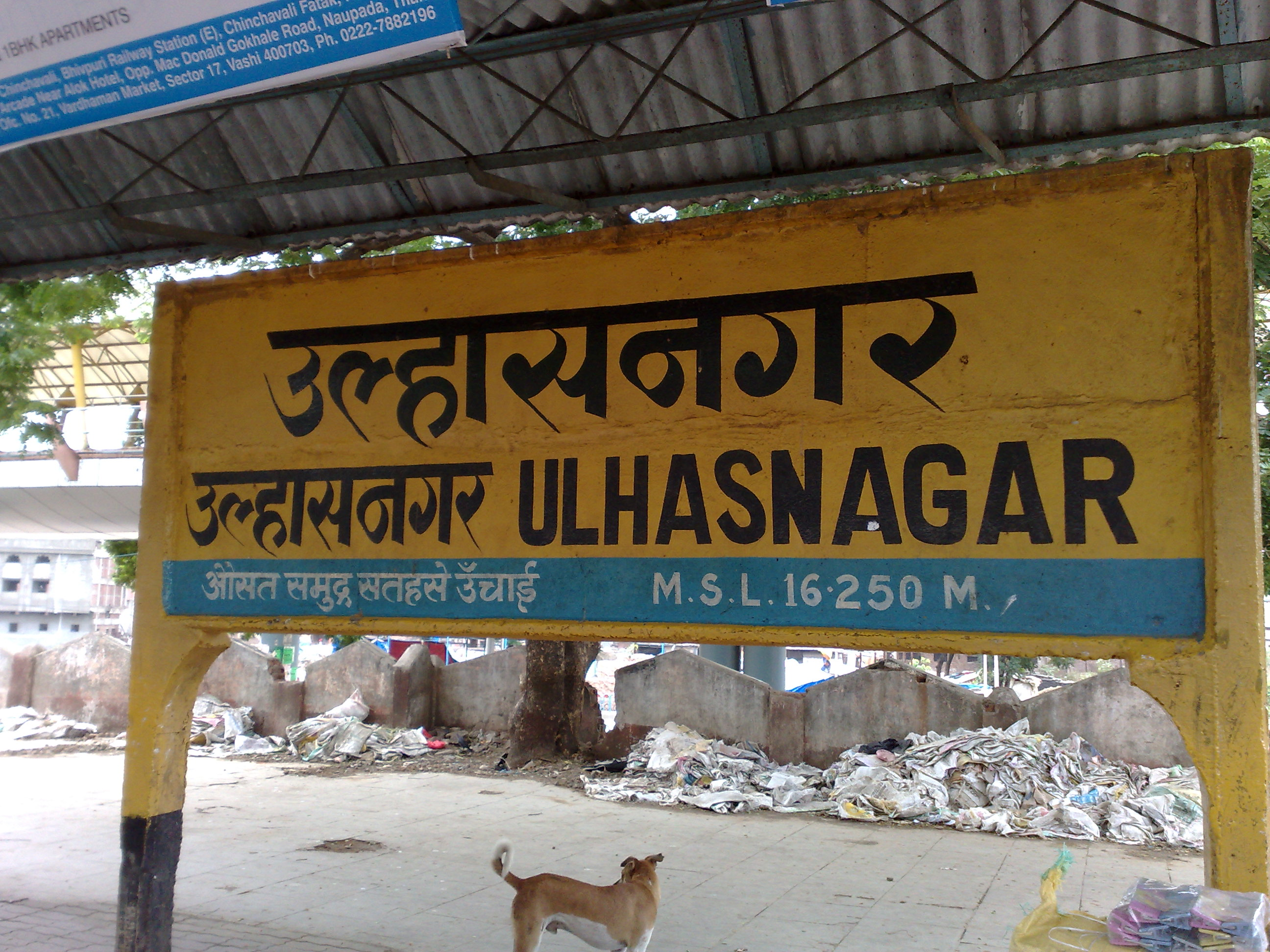
Ulhasnagar railway station board

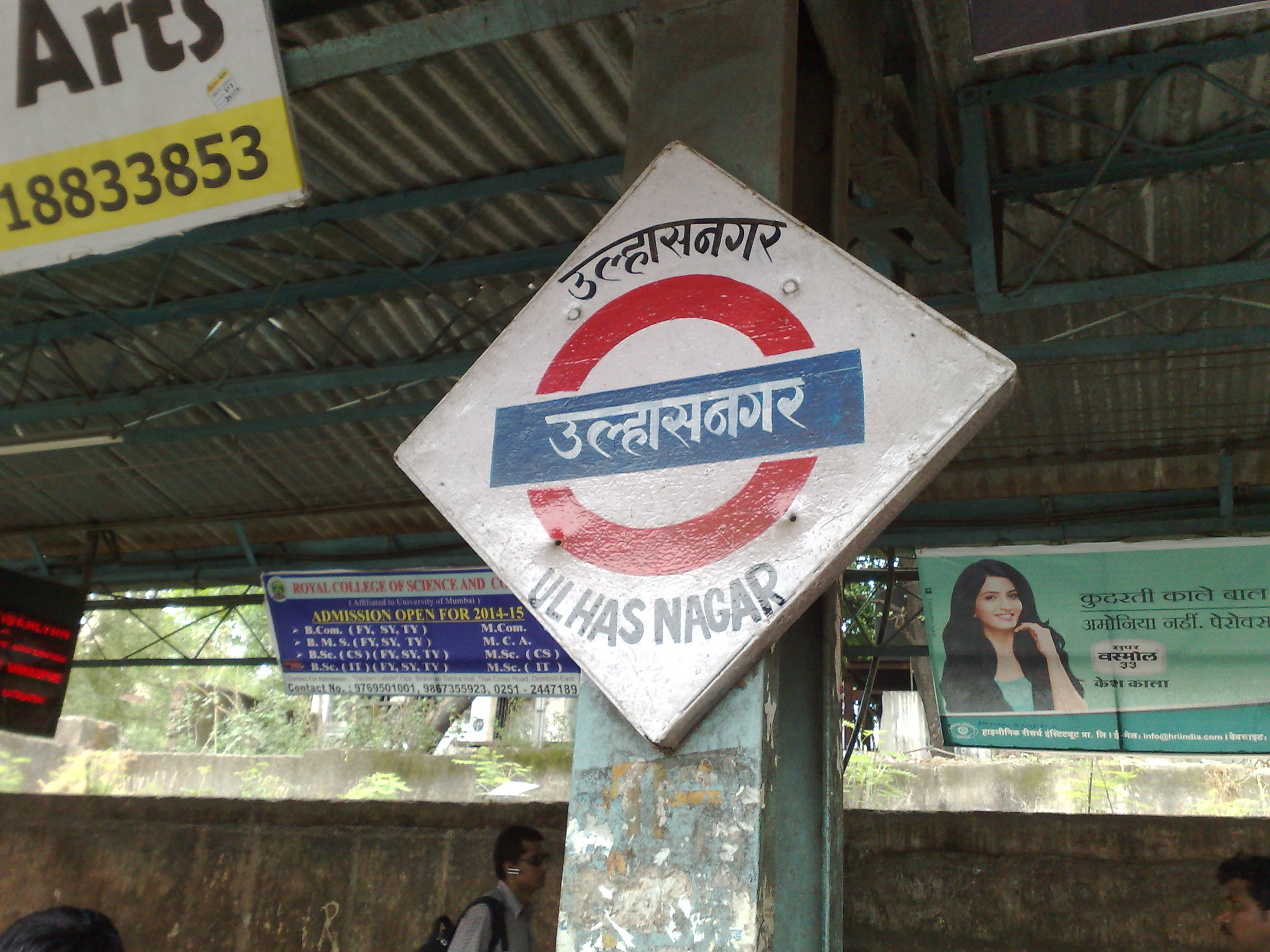
Ulhasnagar railway station

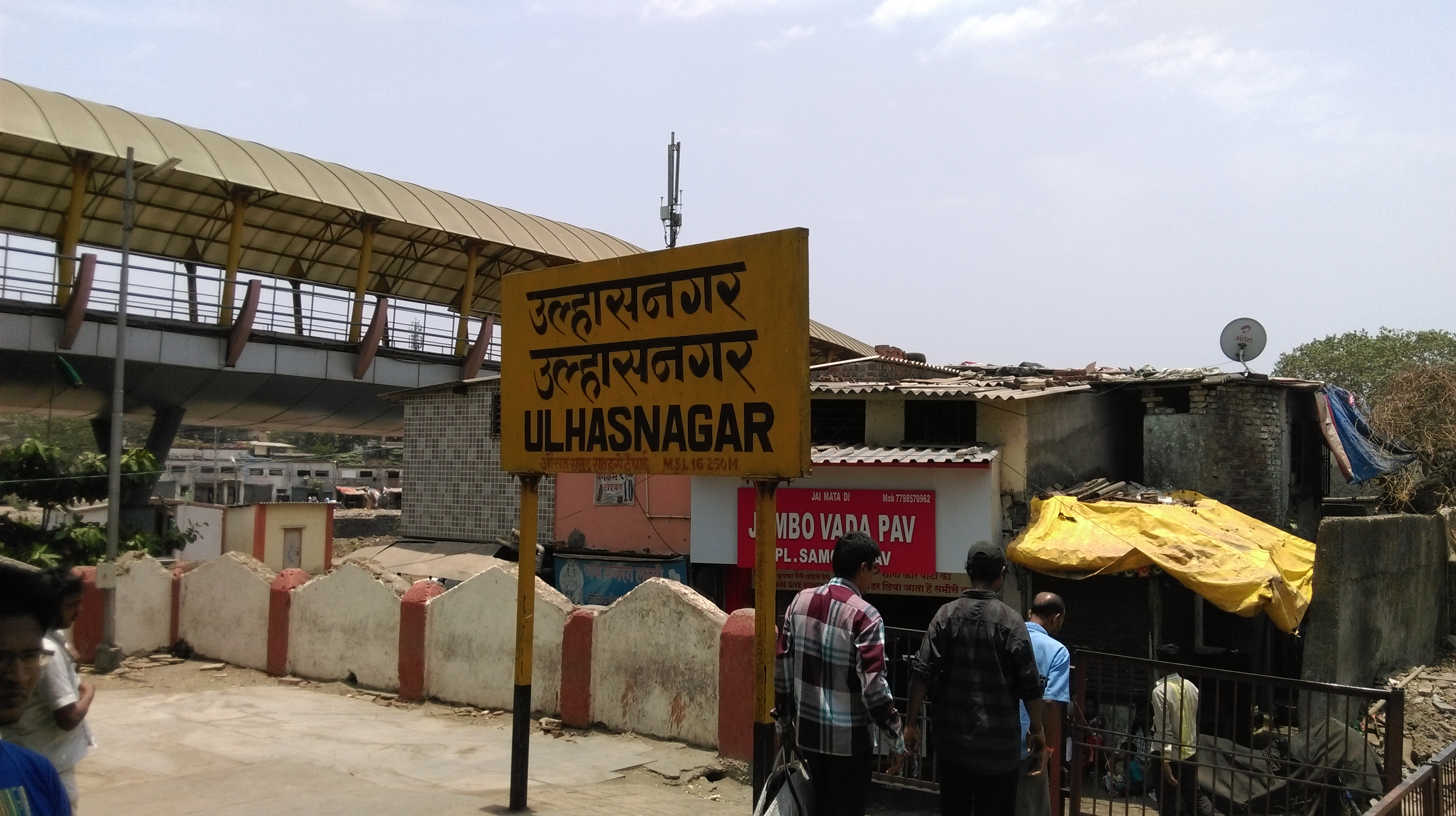
Ulhasnagar Railway Station - Board

== Notes ==
- Dionne Bunsha (17 December 2004). "The States: Ulhasnagar in a new role". The Hindu. Retrieved 24 May 2007.
- "About Ulhasnagar, Introduction of Ulhasnagar, Ulhasnagar Profile". www.ulhasnagaronline.in. Retrieved 2016-01-09.
- Sindhi conversions in Ulhasnagar raise a storm
- Girish Kuber (2007-01-09). "Pappu's Ulhasnagar gambit may backfire". Economic Times. Retrieved 2007-05-24.
- Yogesh Pawar (3 March 1999). "Three Ps rule Ulhas: Pelf, Politicians & Pappu. And his most trusted man Shamsher Ansari Ulhasnagar is mainly distributed in 5 areas, namely Ulhasnagar * 1,2,3,4 and 5". Indian Express. Retrieved 24 May 2007.
- Ulhasnagar Railway Station Near Ramdev Apartment Opp. CHM College
