= Badlapur school sexual abuse case =

2024 sexual abuse case in India

Badlapur School Sexual Abuse Case
- Date: August 12–13, 2024
- Location: Badlapur, Maharashtra, India
- Caused by: Alleged sexual abuse of two minor girls by a school sweeper
- Status: Ongoing investigation

Parties
	Protesters	Maharashtra Police

Lead figures
Accused	Parents, Local Residents	Maharashtra State Government, Thane Police

Number
	Thousands of protesters	

Casualties and losses
	Injuries: 28	Injuries: 28 (including police officers)

Casualties
- Arrested: 72 (as of August 21, 2024)

In August 2024, a male sweeper was alleged to have sexually abused two four-year-old girls at a prominent co-educational school in Badlapur, Maharashtra, India. The case has led to widespread protests and significant public outrage, particularly in the Thane district.

== Incident ==
On 12 and 13 August 2024, a 23-year-old male cleaner employed at the school on a contractual basis allegedly assaulted two pre-primary students in the school's washroom. The incidents were brought to light when one of the victims complained of pain to her parents, which led to the discovery that a second girl had also been assaulted.

== Investigation and legal proceedings ==
The accused was arrested on 17 August, following the filing of a first information report (FIR) by the parents on 16 August.

A man was subsequently charged under the Protection of Children from Sexual Offences Act (POCSO Act) and was remanded in police custody until 26 August.

On 23 September 2024, Akshay Shinde, the main accused was killed in an encounter with a cop named Sanjay Shinde.

On April 7, 2025, the Bombay High Court set up a Special Investigation Team (SIT) to investigate the encounter killing of the main accused in the Badlapur school sexual assault case.

== Reactions ==
=== Public reaction and protests ===
Following the allegations, the parents of the victims and thousands of local residents initiated protests against the school administration for alleged negligence and an attempted cover-up. The protests escalated on 20 August, with demonstrators blocking train tracks at Badlapur railway station, leading to widespread disruption of train services. The situation further deteriorated when the protests turned violent, resulting in a police lathi charge and stone-pelting that left several individuals, including police officers, injured.

=== Government and institutional responses ===
The incident prompted sharp criticism of the school's handling of the situation and the delayed legal proceedings. The Maha Vikas Aghadi (MVA) coalition announced a state-wide bandh on August 24, 2024, to protest against the incident and demand swift justice for the victims. Maharashtra Deputy Chief Minister Devendra Fadnavis ordered a special investigation team (SIT) to be led by senior IPS officer Arti Singh to investigate the case.

The Maharashtra State Commission for Protection of Child Rights criticised the school management for allegedly attempting to cover up the incident instead of reporting it to the authorities. This led to the suspension of the school principal and several staff members. The state government announced the formation of 'Vishaka Committees' in schools to address grievances related to sexual harassment and offending and ensure the proper functioning of CCTV cameras on school premises.

== See also ==
- Protection of Children from Sexual Offences Act
- Vishaka Guidelines
