= Shiv Mandir, Ambarnath =

Hindu Temple in India

Ambernath Shiv Mandir
- अंबरनाथ शिव मंदिर
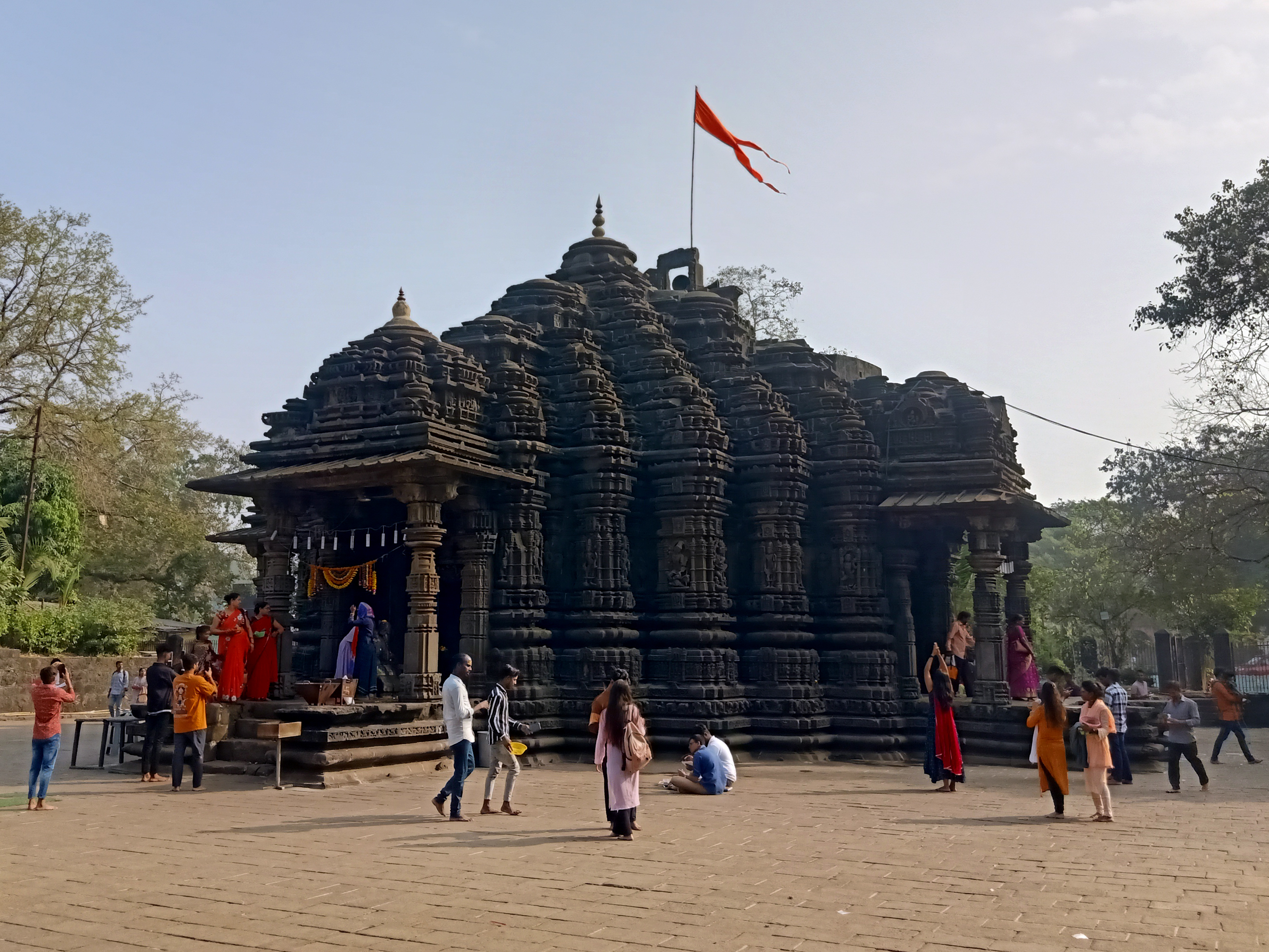

Religion
- Affiliation: Hinduism
- District: Thane
- Deity: Shiva
- Festival: Maha Shivratri

Location
- Location: Ambernath
- State: Maharashtra
- Country: India
- Interactive map of Ambernath Shiv Mandir
- Coordinates: 19.1986°N 73.1766°E

Architecture
- Style: Bhumija Sthapatyashaili
- Creator: Shilahara Dynesty
- Established: 1060 AD
- Materials: Basalt

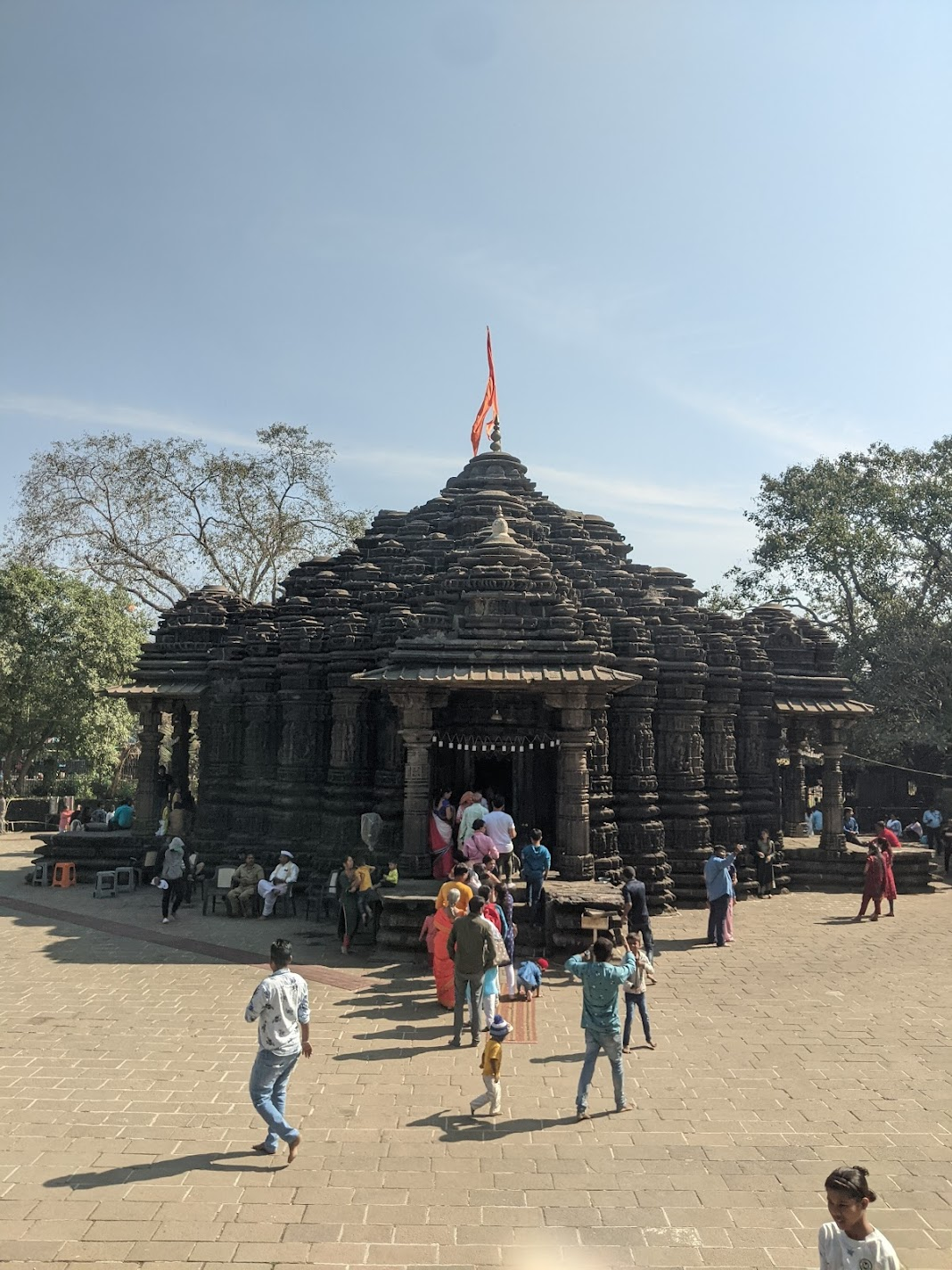
Temple in 2023

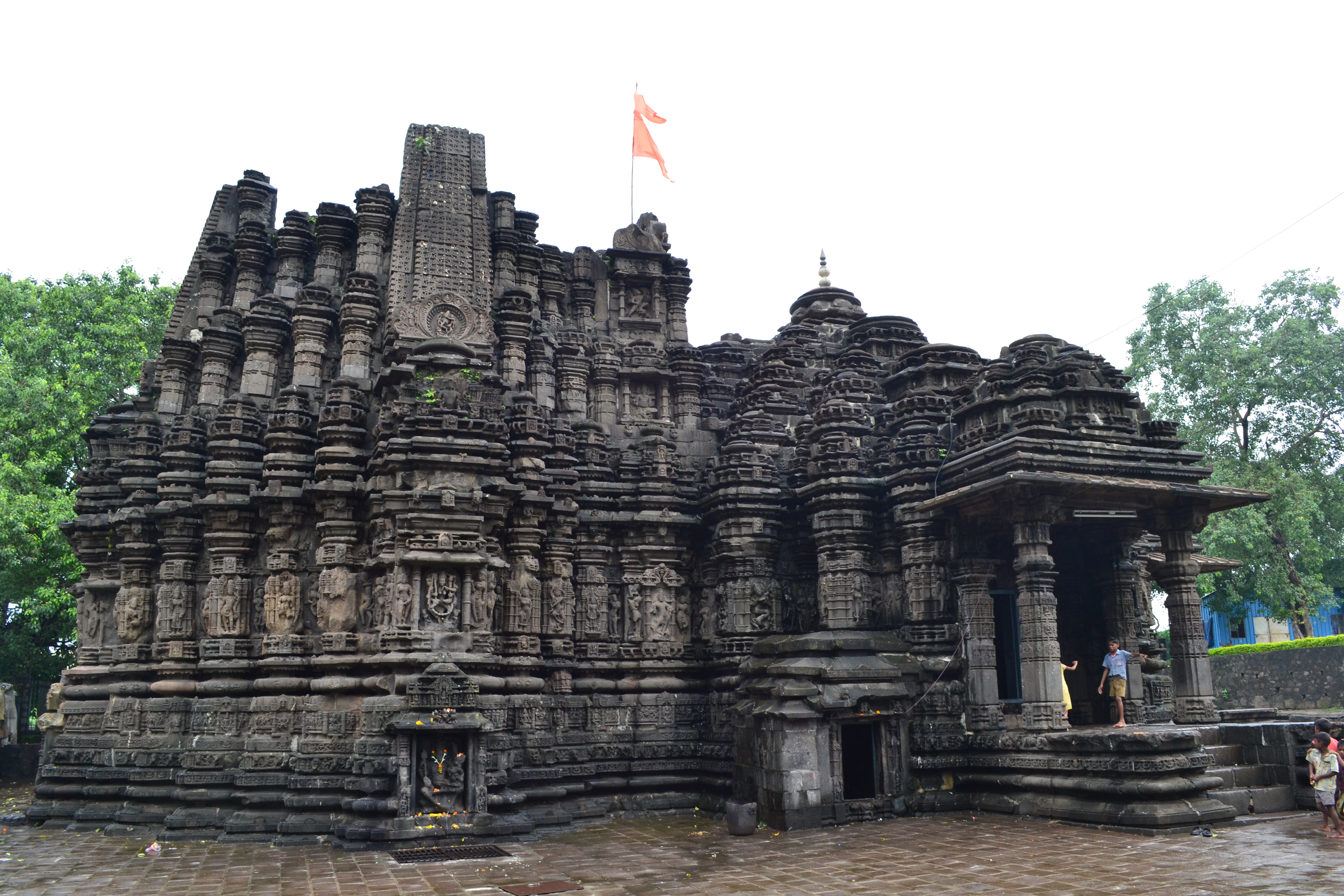
From the side, showing the truncated shikhara at left and a side porch.

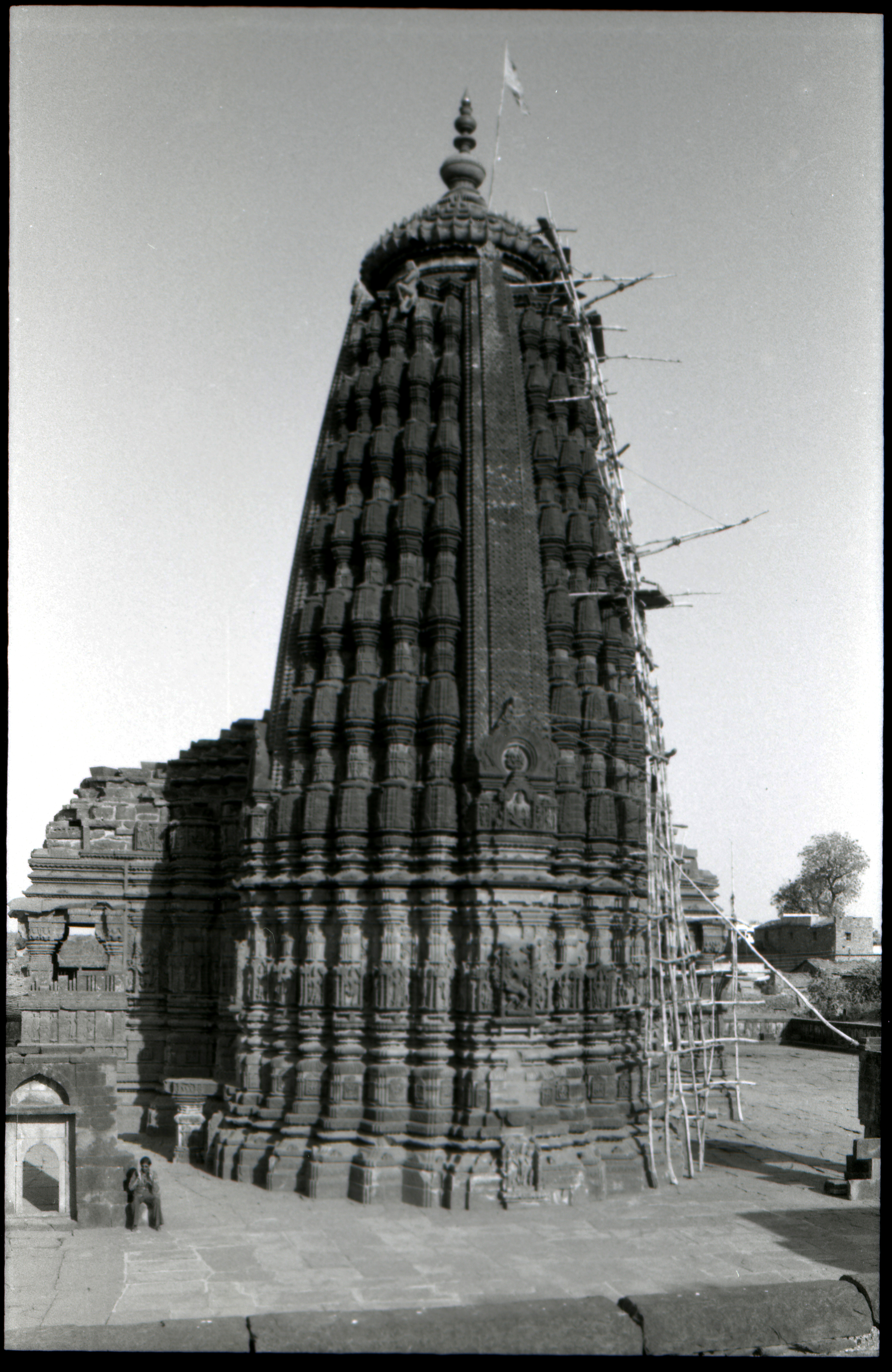
Udayesvara Temple in Udaipur, Madhya Pradesh

The Shiv Mandir of Ambarnath is a historic 11th-century Hindu temple, at Ambarnath near Mumbai, in Maharashtra, India. It is also known as the Ambreshwar Shiva Temple, and known locally as Puratana Shivalaya. It is situated on the bank of the Waldhuni river, 2 km away from Ambarnath railway station (East). The temple was built in 1060 CE carved in stone. It was probably built by Shilahara king Chhittaraja, it may also have been rebuilt by his son Mummuni.

Unusually, the sanctuary or garbhagriha is below ground, reached by some 20 steps down from the mandapa, and is open to the sky as the shikhara tower above stops abruptly at a little above the height of the mandapa, and was apparently never completed. It is in bhumija form, and if completed would have been close in form to the Udayesvara Temple also known as Neelkantheshwara temple in Udaipur, Madhya Pradesh, begun in 1059, and the Gondeshwar Temple at Sinnar. It is clear from what was built that the shikhara would have followed these in having four corner bands of gavaksha-honeycomb sweeping uninterrupted up the full height of the tower, while in between each face has rows of five spirelets on individual podia, reducing in size up the tower.

There's also a possibility that the shikhar here represents of Sky as the name suggests Ambarnath which means the Sky. अंबर in sanskrit is sky. So the shikhar here is sky and thus the tower might have not stopped abruptly.

The mandapa has three porches. Much of the exterior figure carving is damaged, but some female and divine figures remain.

== Gallery ==
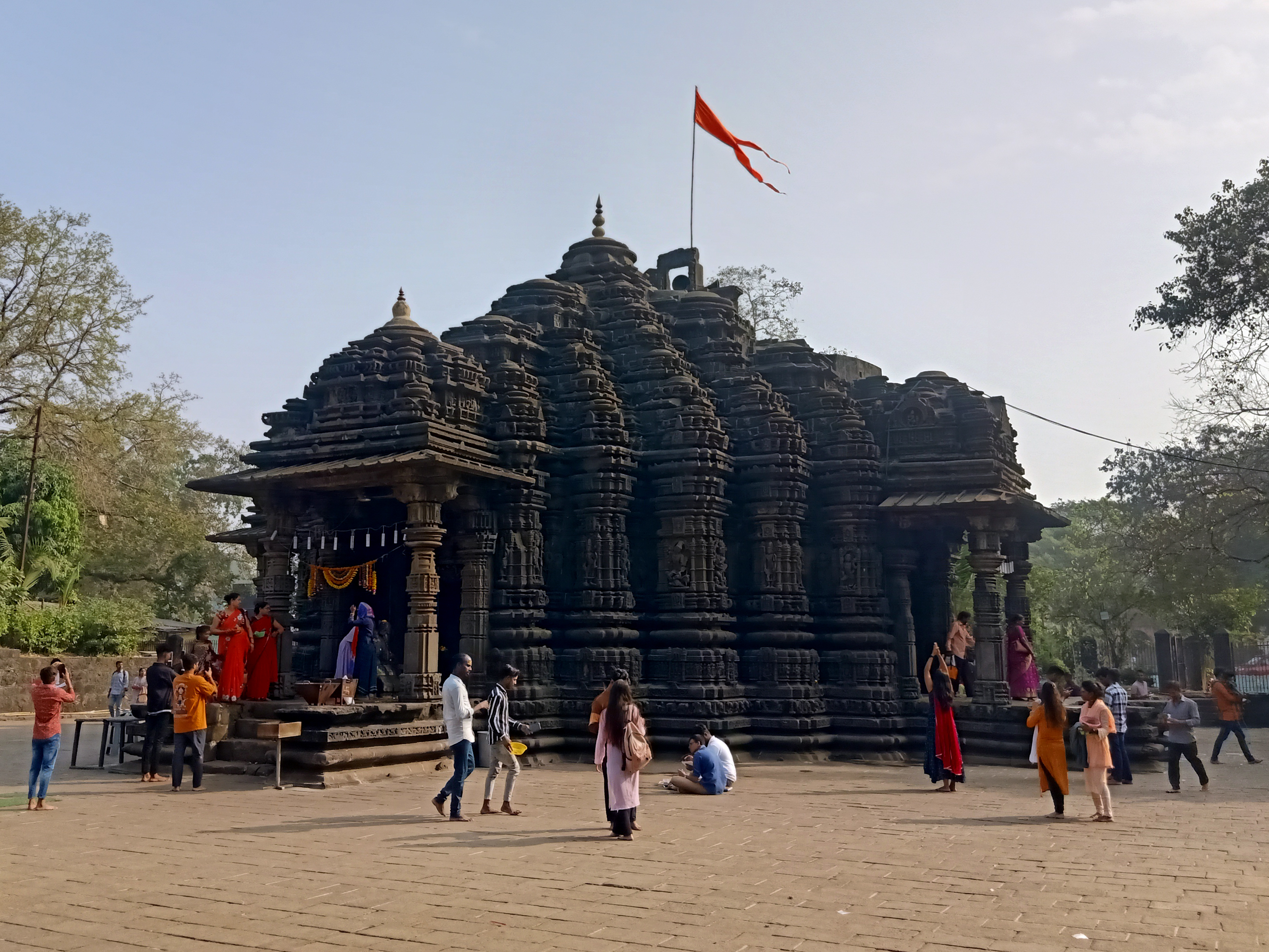

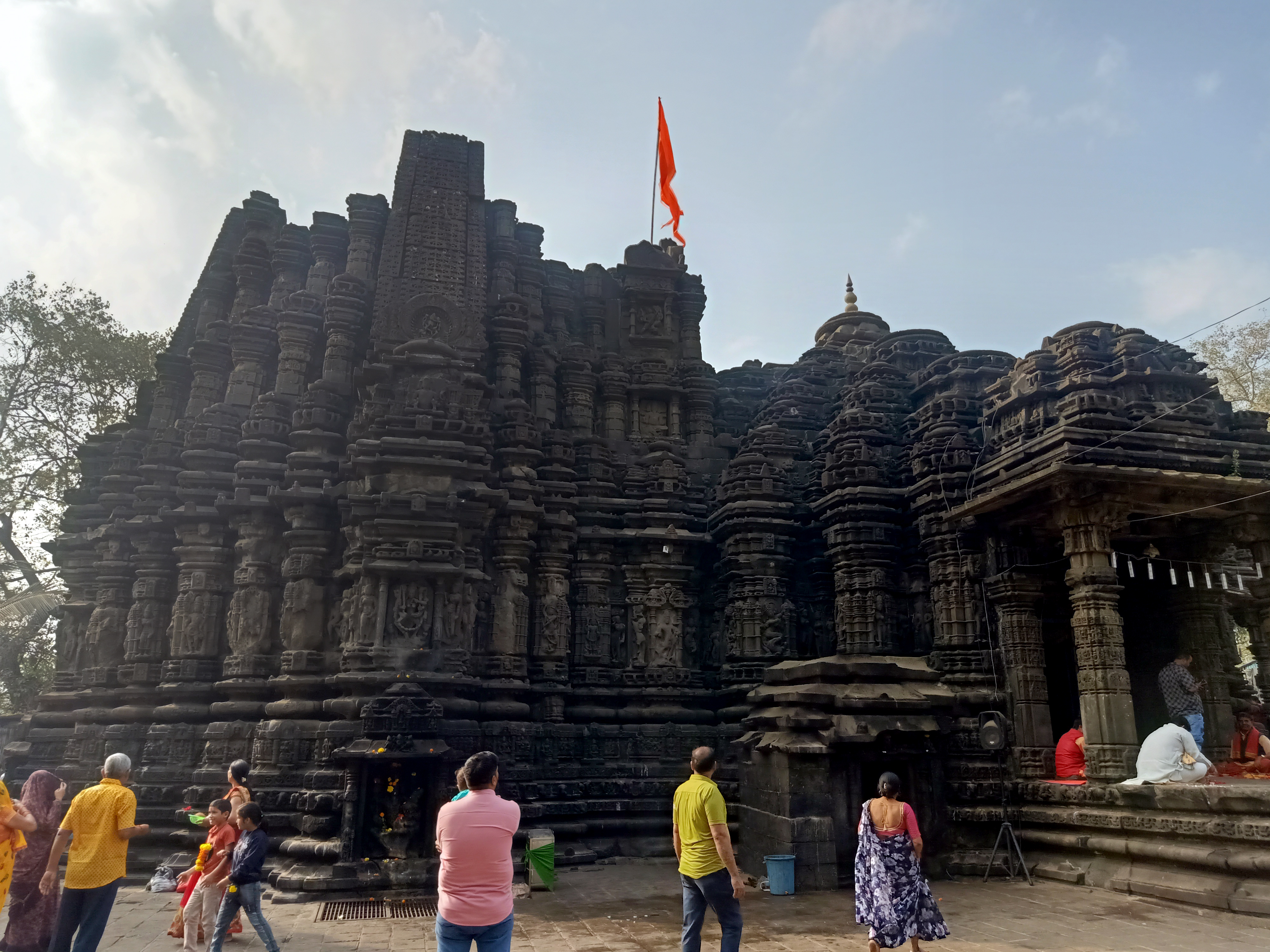

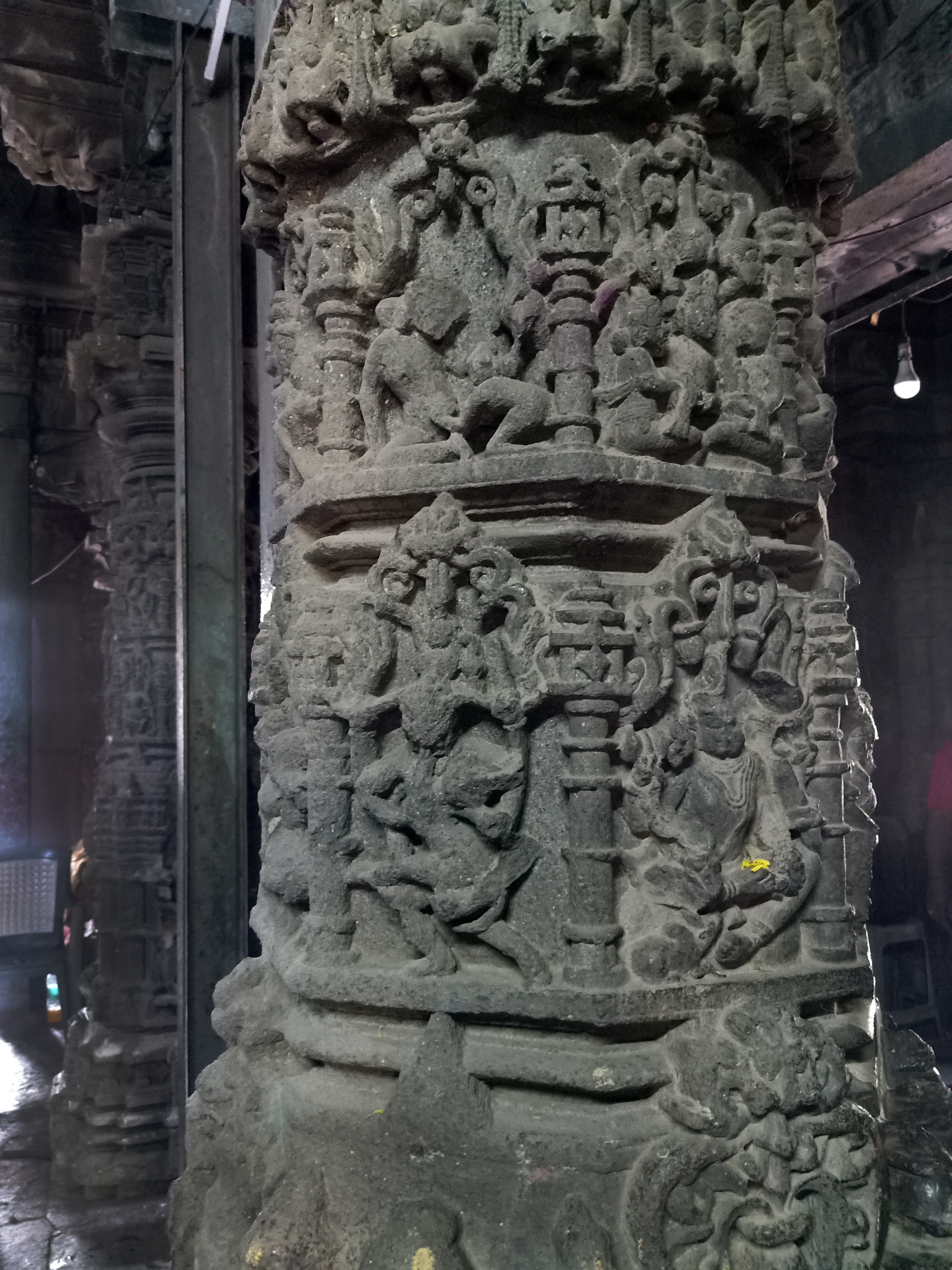

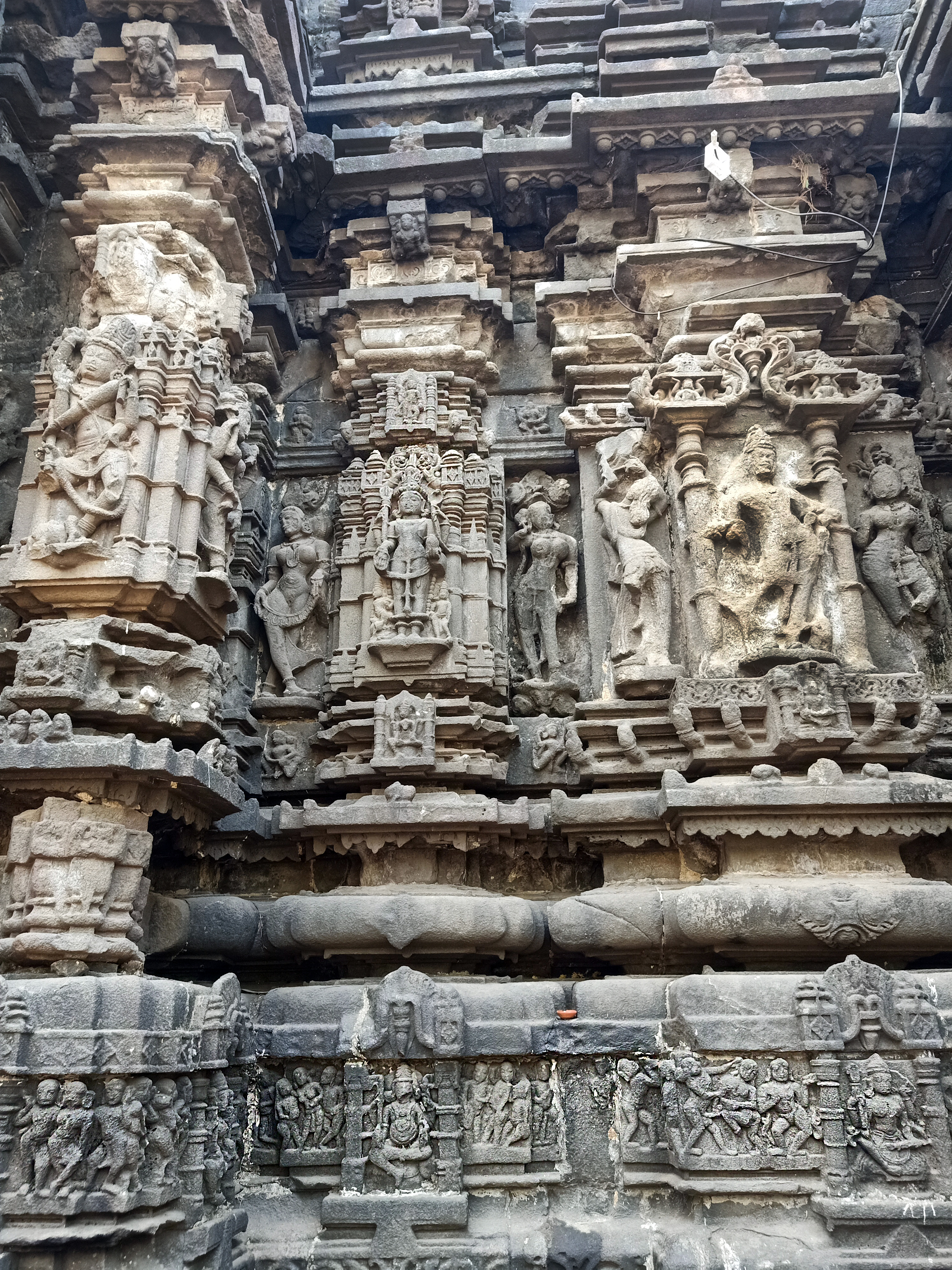

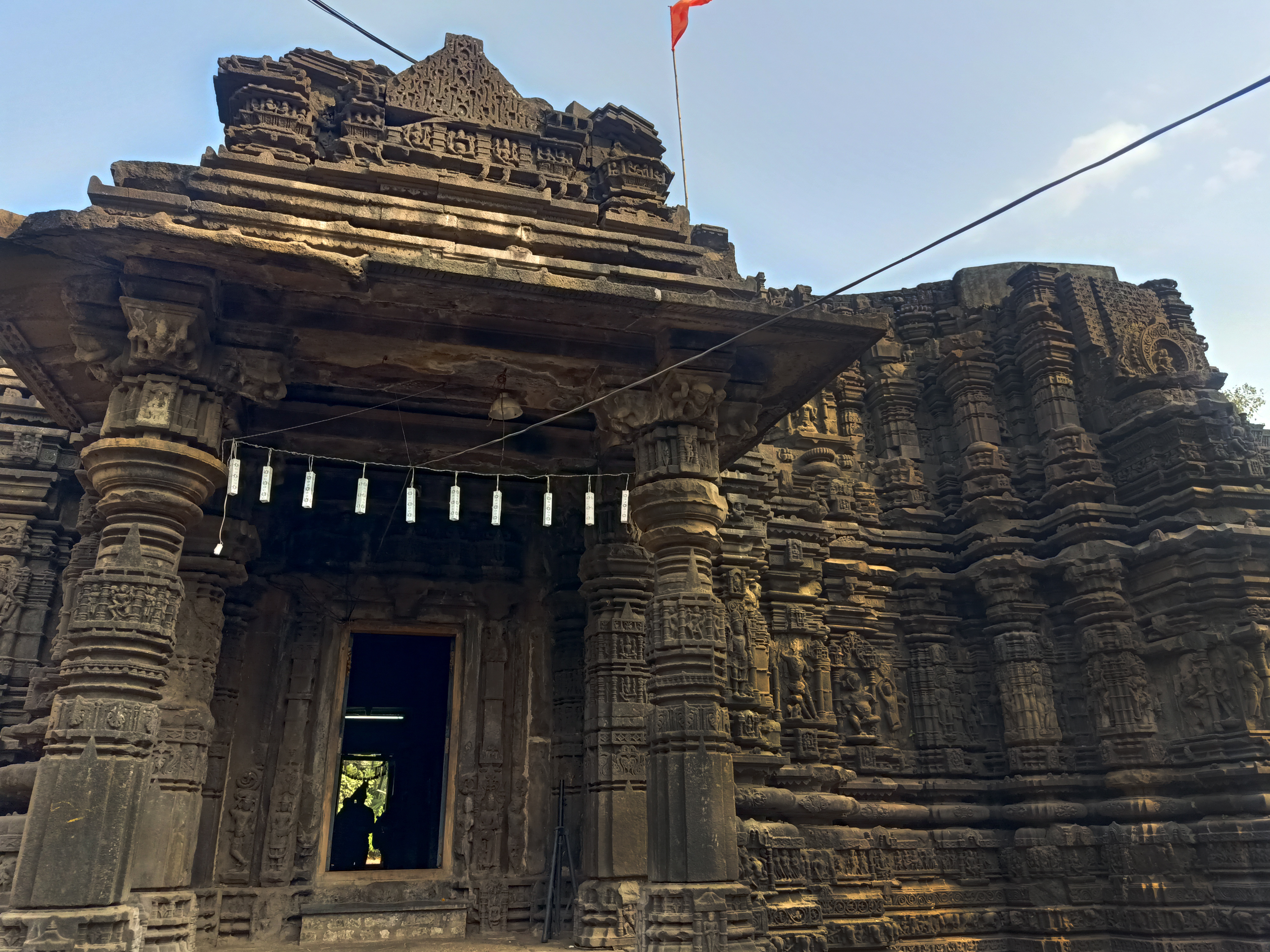

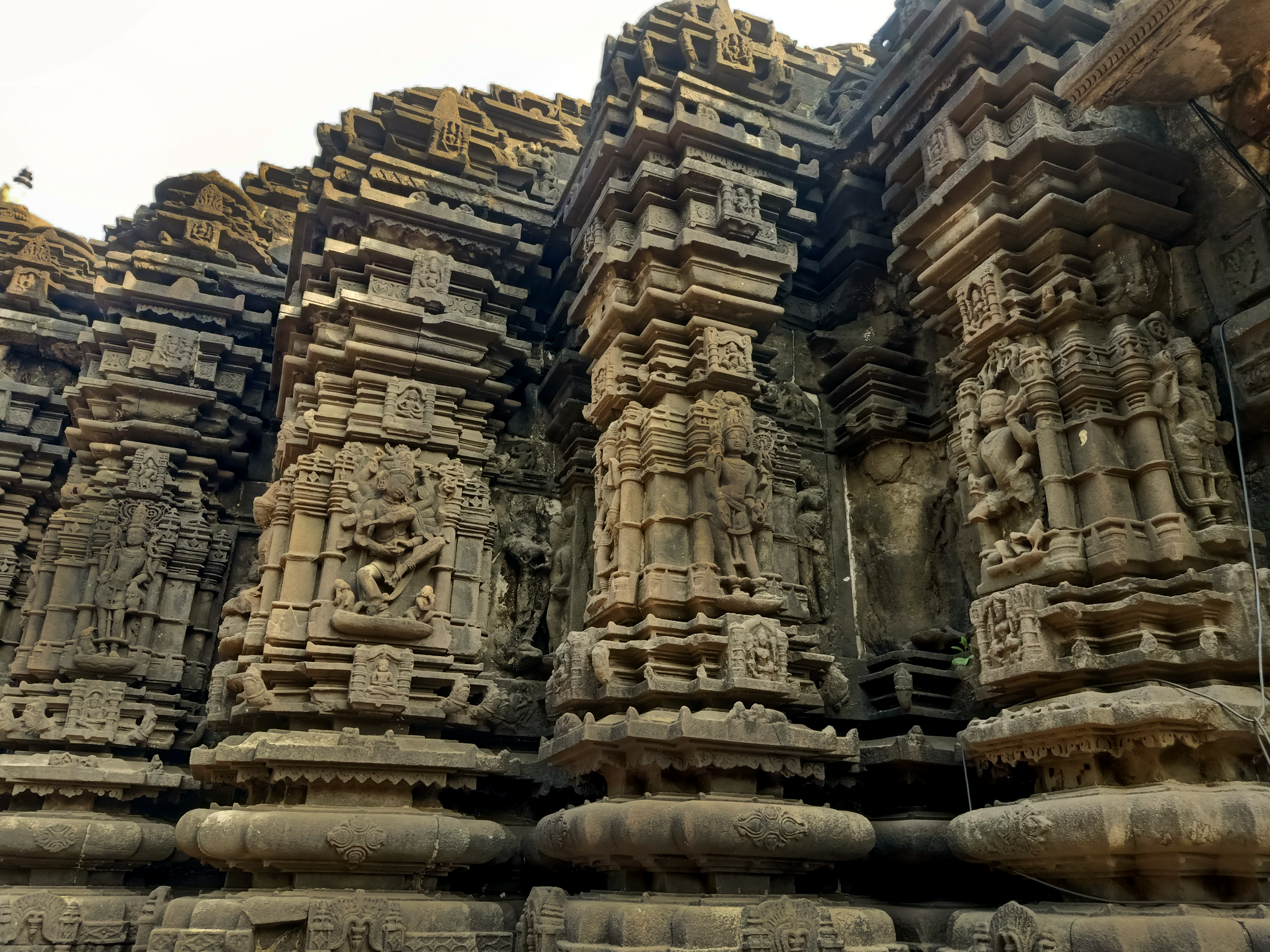

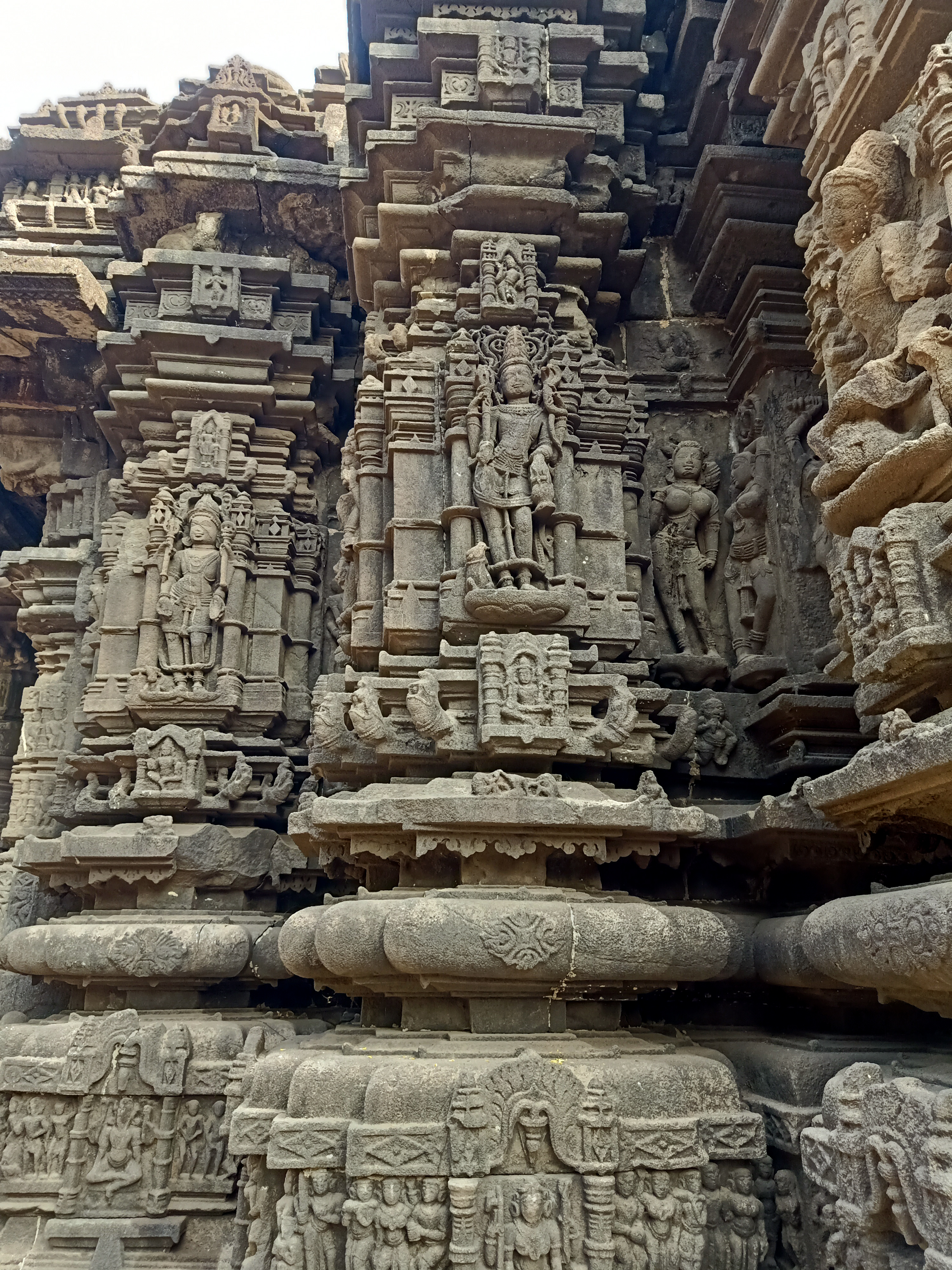

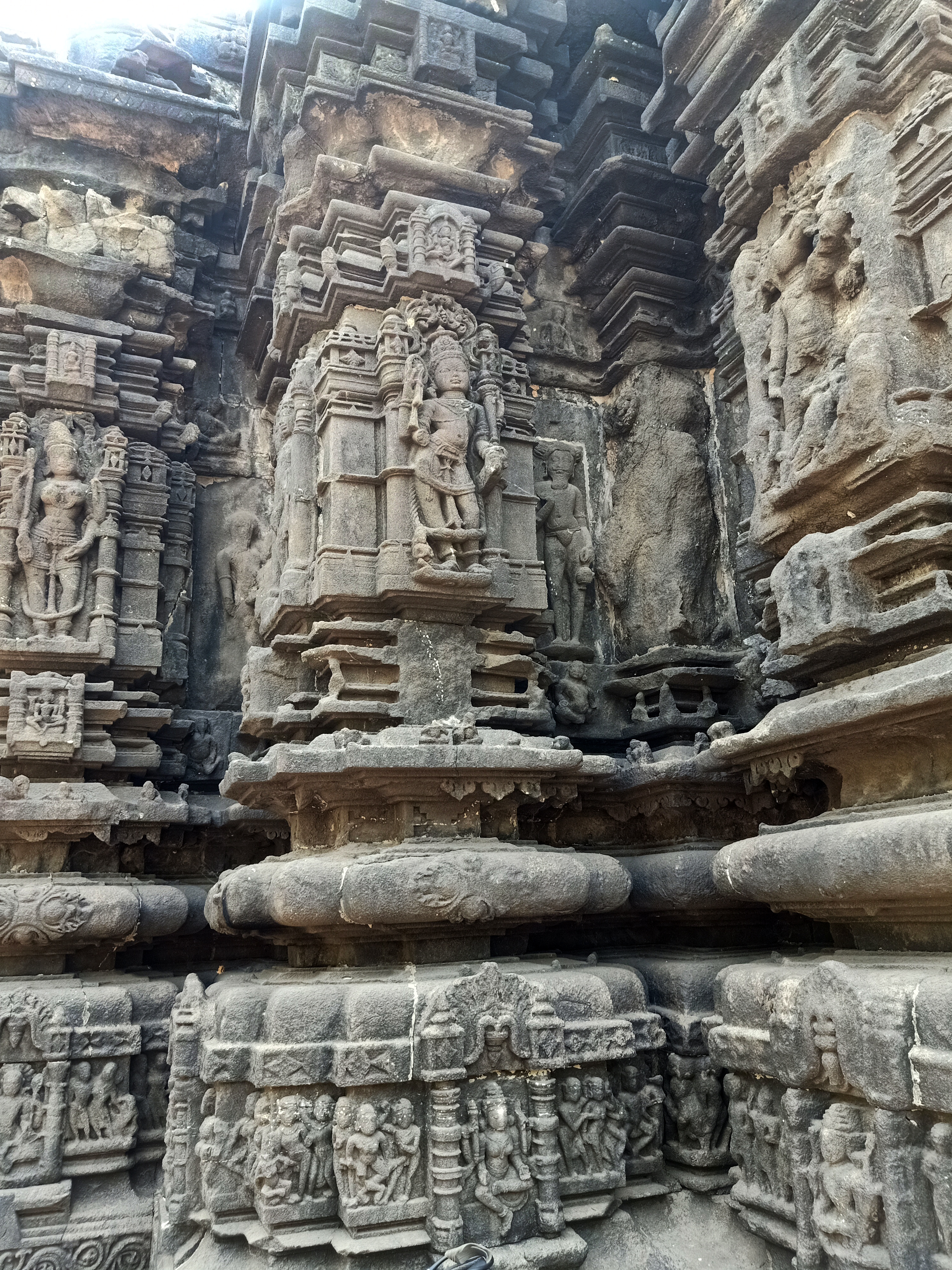

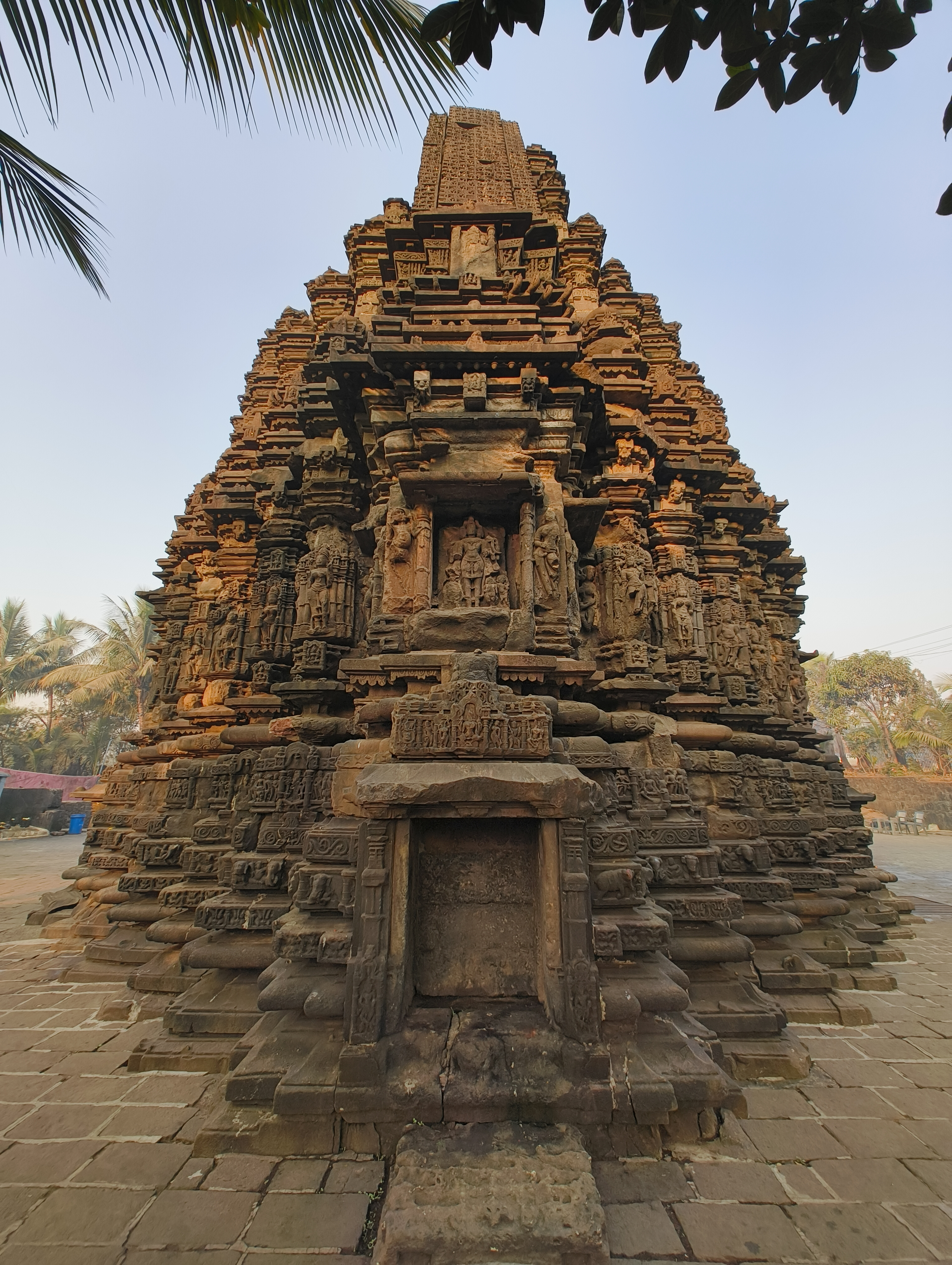

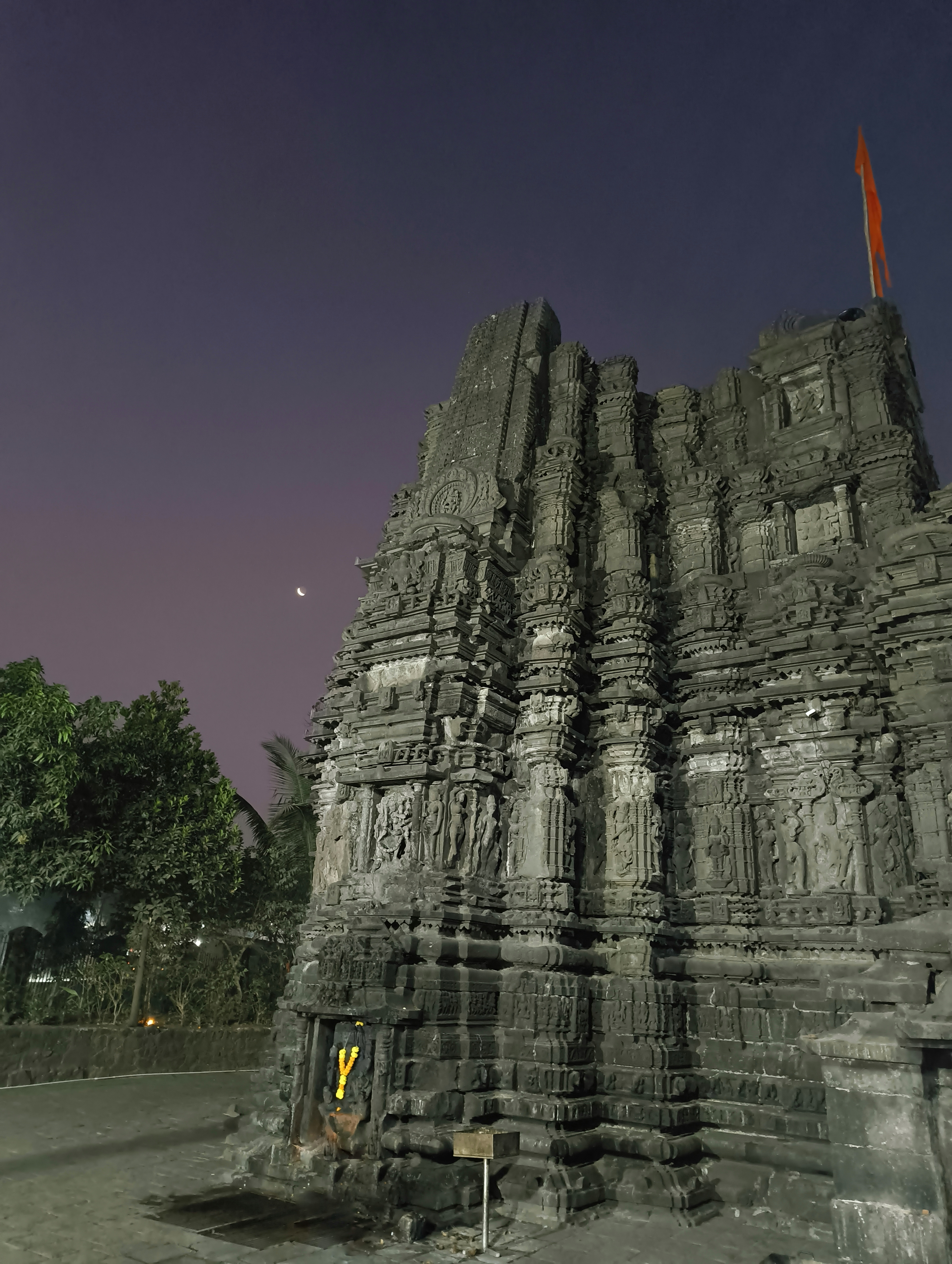
