= Vithalwadi railway station =

Railway station in Maharashtra, India

Vithalwadi

General information
- Location: Vithalwadi, Thane
- Coordinates: 19.228793°N 73.148610°E
- Elevation: 13.25 metres (43.5 ft)
- System: Indian Railways and Mumbai Suburban Railway station
- Owner: Ministry of Railways, Indian Railways
- Line: Central Line
- Platforms: 2
- Tracks: 2

Construction
- Structure type: Standard, on ground
- Parking: Yes
- Cycle facilities: Yes

Other information
- Status: Active
- Station code: VLDI
- Fare zone: Central Railways

History
- Opened: 1 November 1948

Services
Preceding station	Mumbai Suburban Railway	Following station
Kalyan Junction towards Chhatrapati Shivaji Terminus	Central line	Ulhasnagar towards Khopoli
Route map
Location
- Location within India Location within Maharashtra

Vithalwadi (station code: VLDI) is a railway station on the Central line of the Mumbai Suburban Railway network. It is on the Karjat route. Kalyan is the previous stop and Ulhasnagar is the next stop.
