= Badlapur railway station =

Railway station in Maharashtra

Badlapur

General information
- Coordinates: 19.15°N 73.262°E
- Elevation: 21.34 metres (70.0 ft)
- System: Indian Railways and Mumbai Suburban Railway station
- Owner: Ministry of Railways, Indian Railways
- Line: Central Line
- Platforms: 3
- Tracks: 3

Construction
- Structure type: Standard on-ground station
- Parking: Yes
- Cycle facilities: No

Other information
- Status: Active
- Station code: BUD
- Fare zone: Central Railways

History
- Opened: 12 May 1856

Services
Preceding station	Mumbai Suburban Railway	Following station
Ambarnath towards Chhatrapati Shivaji Terminus	Central line	Vangani towards Khopoli
Route map
Location
- Location within India Location within Maharashtra

Badlapur railway station (station code: BUD) is a railway station on the Central line of the Mumbai Suburban Railway network. It is built for the town of Badlapur. It is the station with the highest footfall between Kalyan and Karjat.

== Proposed Development ==
Due to heavy crowding and rapid housing development near Ambarnath and Badlapur, there has been increasing demand to improve station facilities. A request has been made to grant Badlapur railway station with "terminus" status, extend platform lengths, and investigate the possibility of providing halts for express trains at Badlapur station post-extension.

A new study on the feasibility of starting a Badlapur-Pune Vande Bharat Express service has also been ordered by Ashwini Vaishnaw.

== Demonstrations ==
On August 20, 2024, hundreds of protestors blocked the tracks at Badlapur railway station to protest the sexual abuse of two nursery school girls, allegedly by a sweeper in the girl's washroom. Local train services were disrupted for over eight hours and some long-distance trains had to be diverted.

== Gallery ==
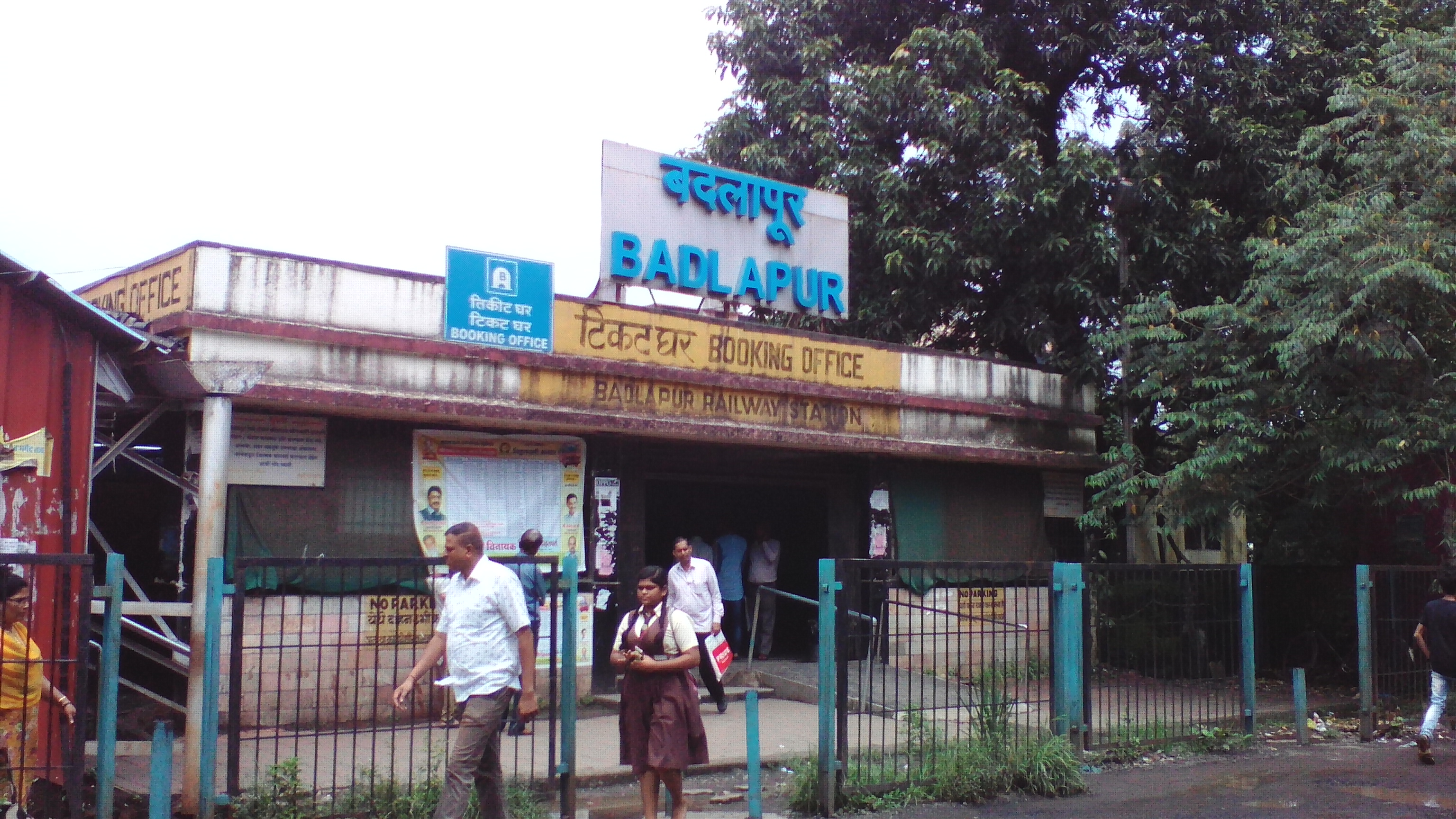
Badlapur railway station booking office

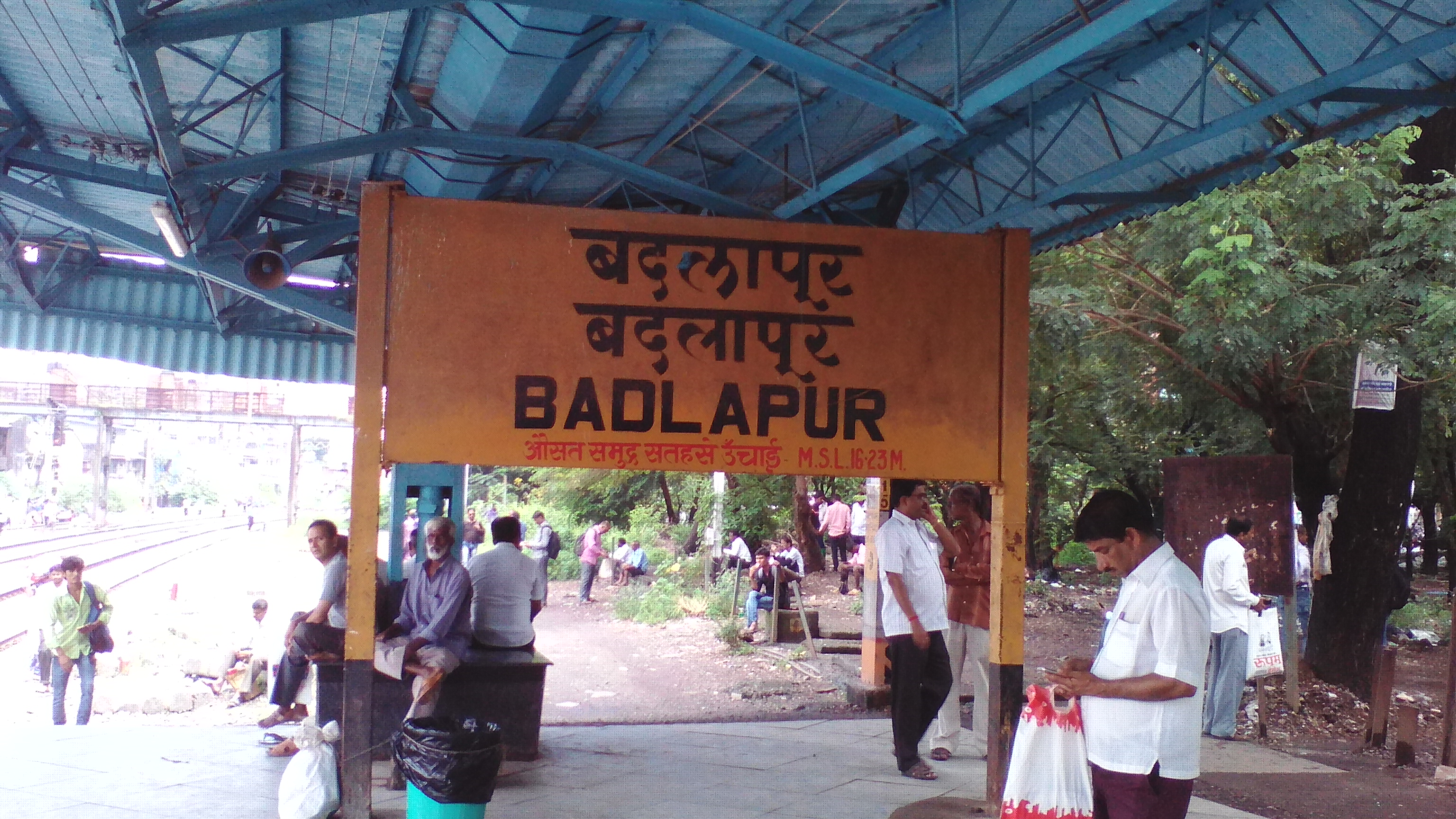
Badlapur railway station stationboard

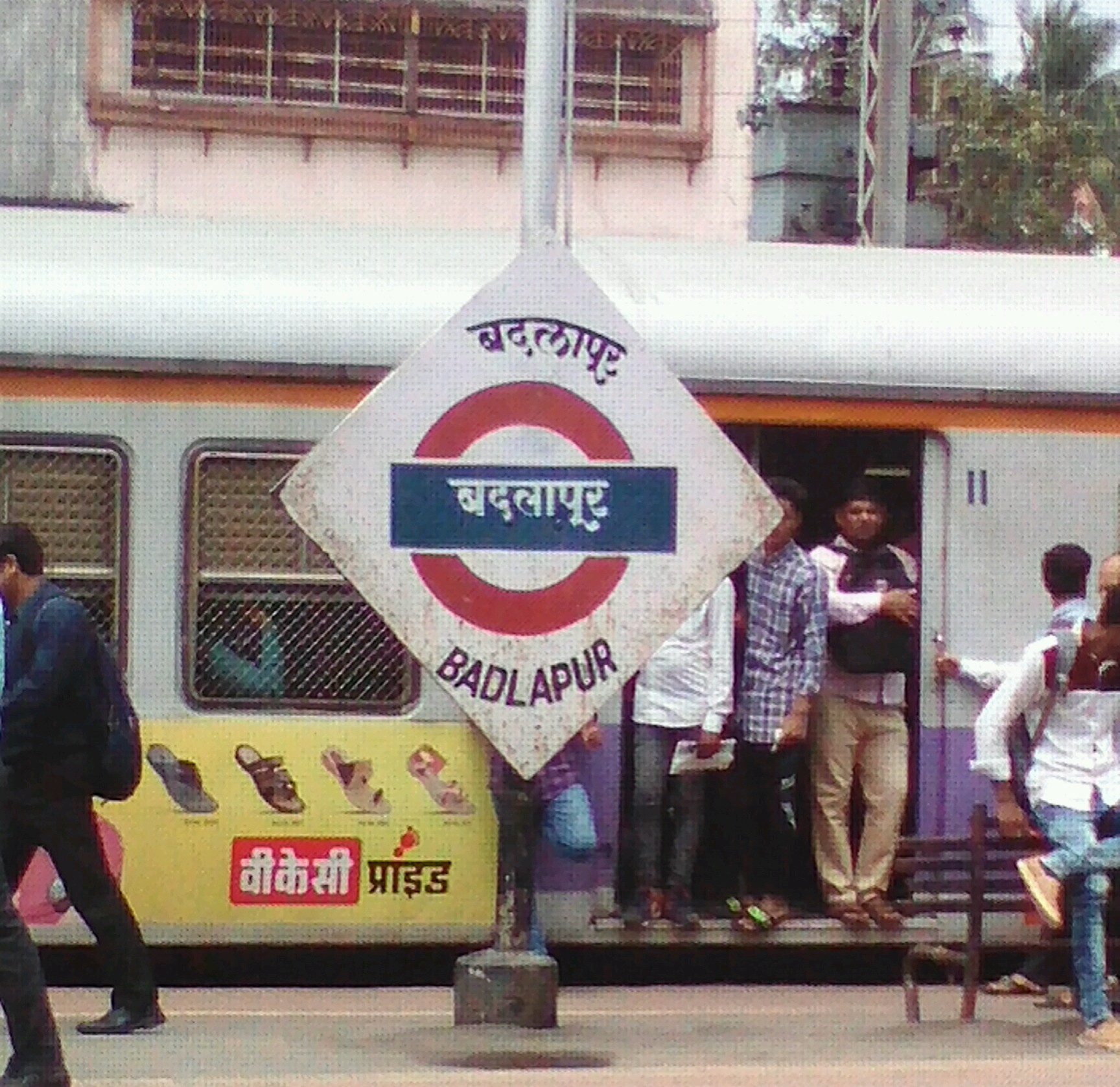
Badlapur railway station platform board

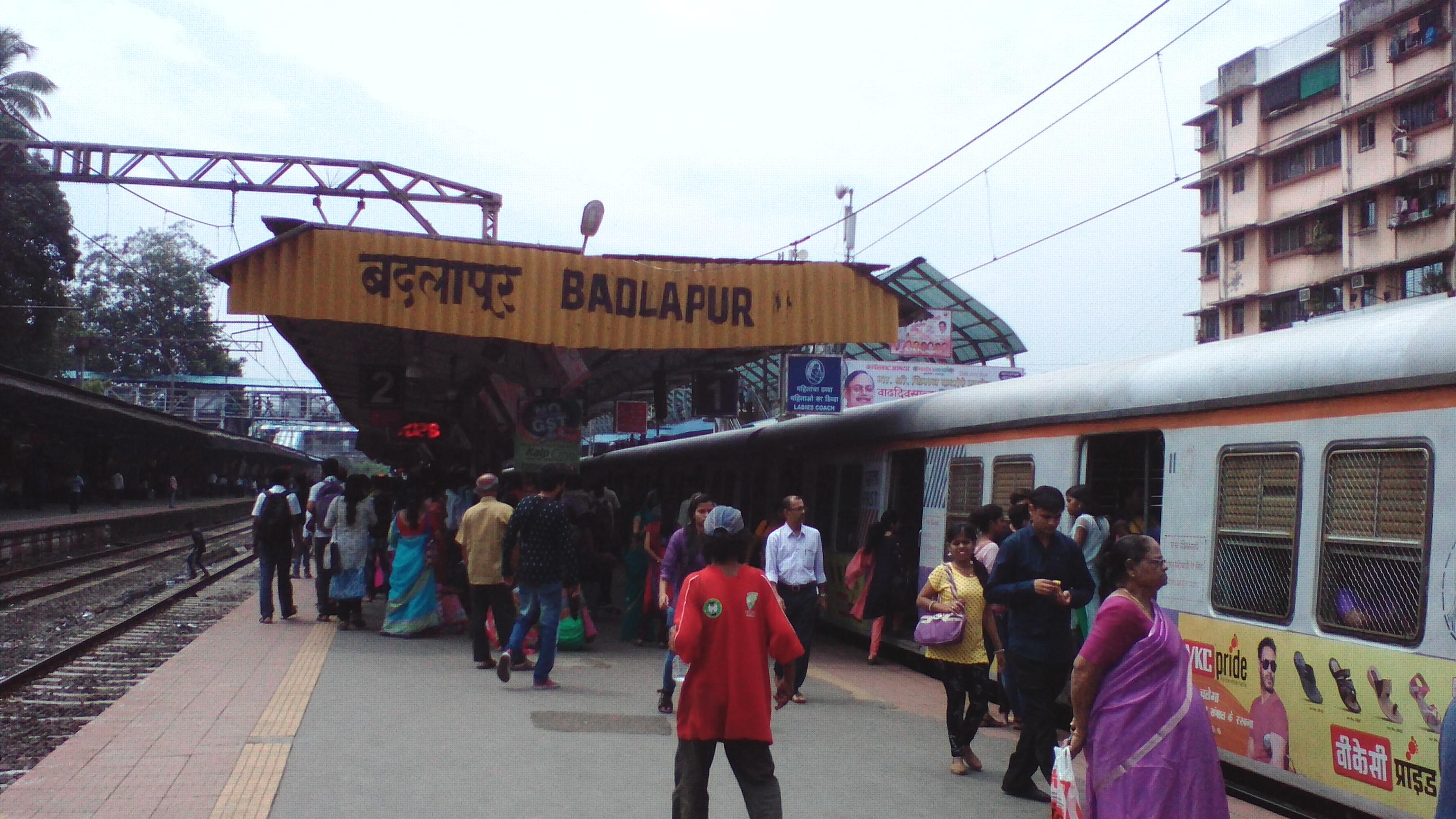
Rooftop of Badlapur railway station

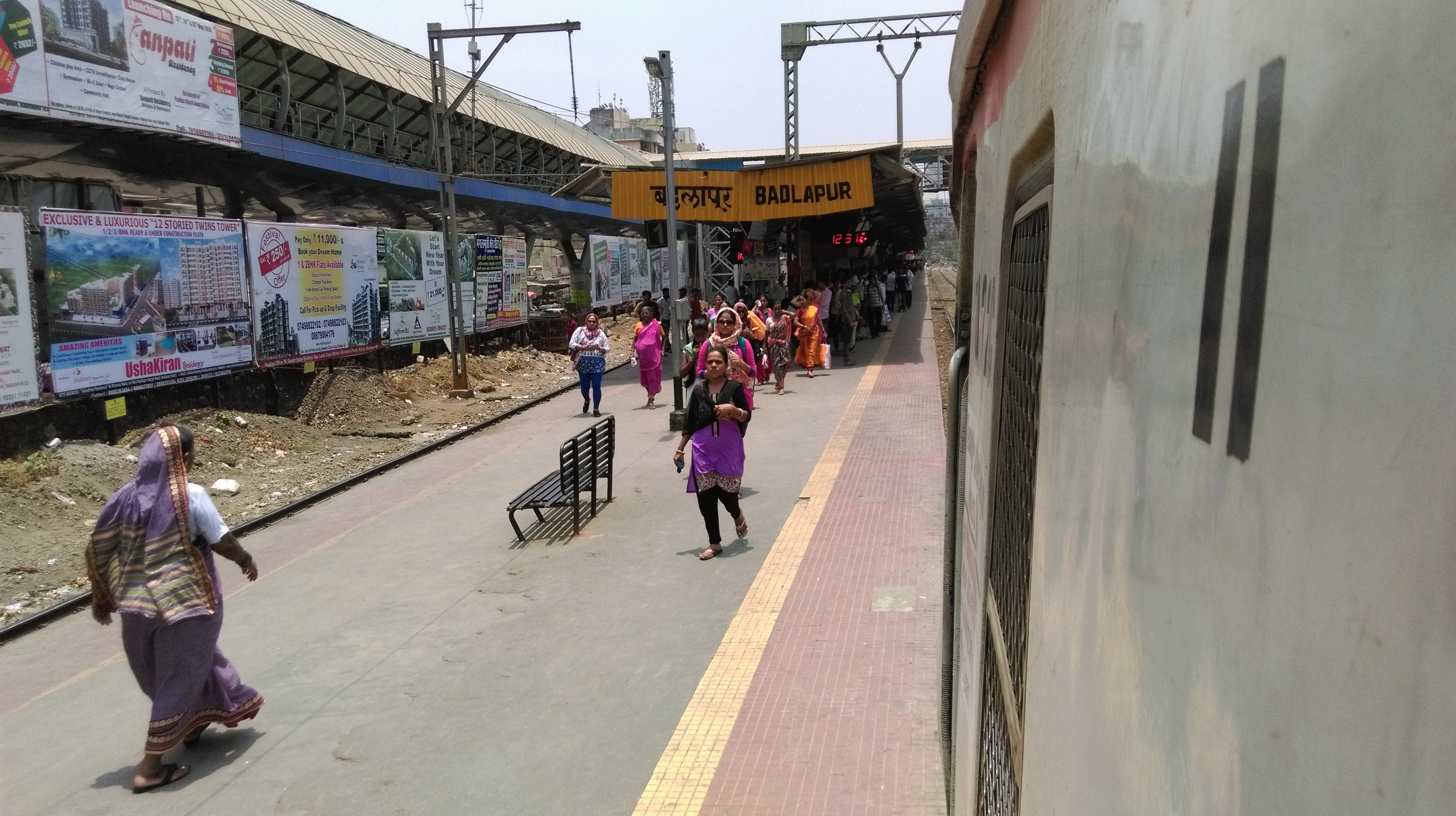
Badlapur railway station – Platform 2

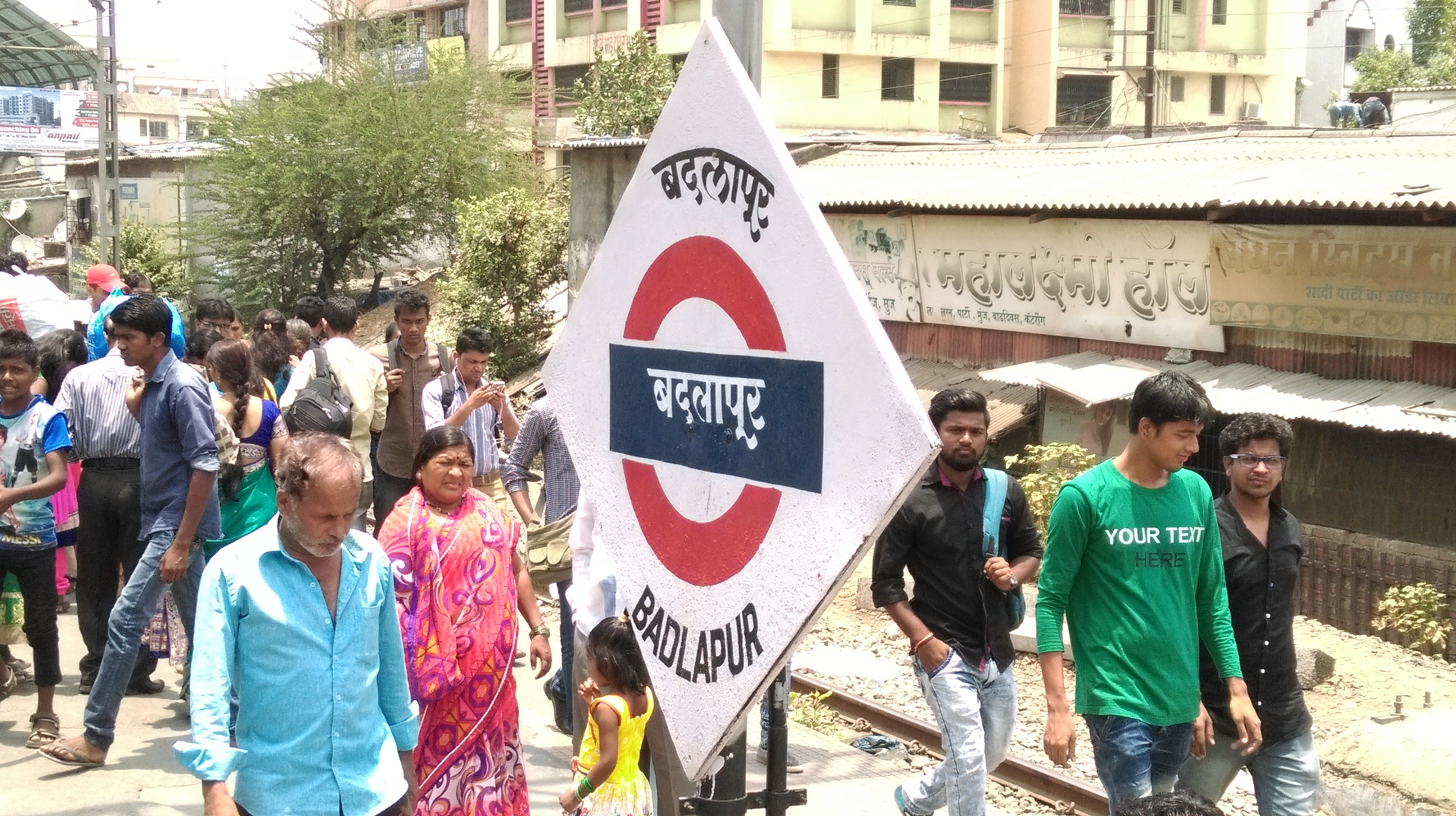
Badlapur railway station – Platform board
