= Ambarnath railway station =

Railway Station in Maharashtra, India

Ambarnath
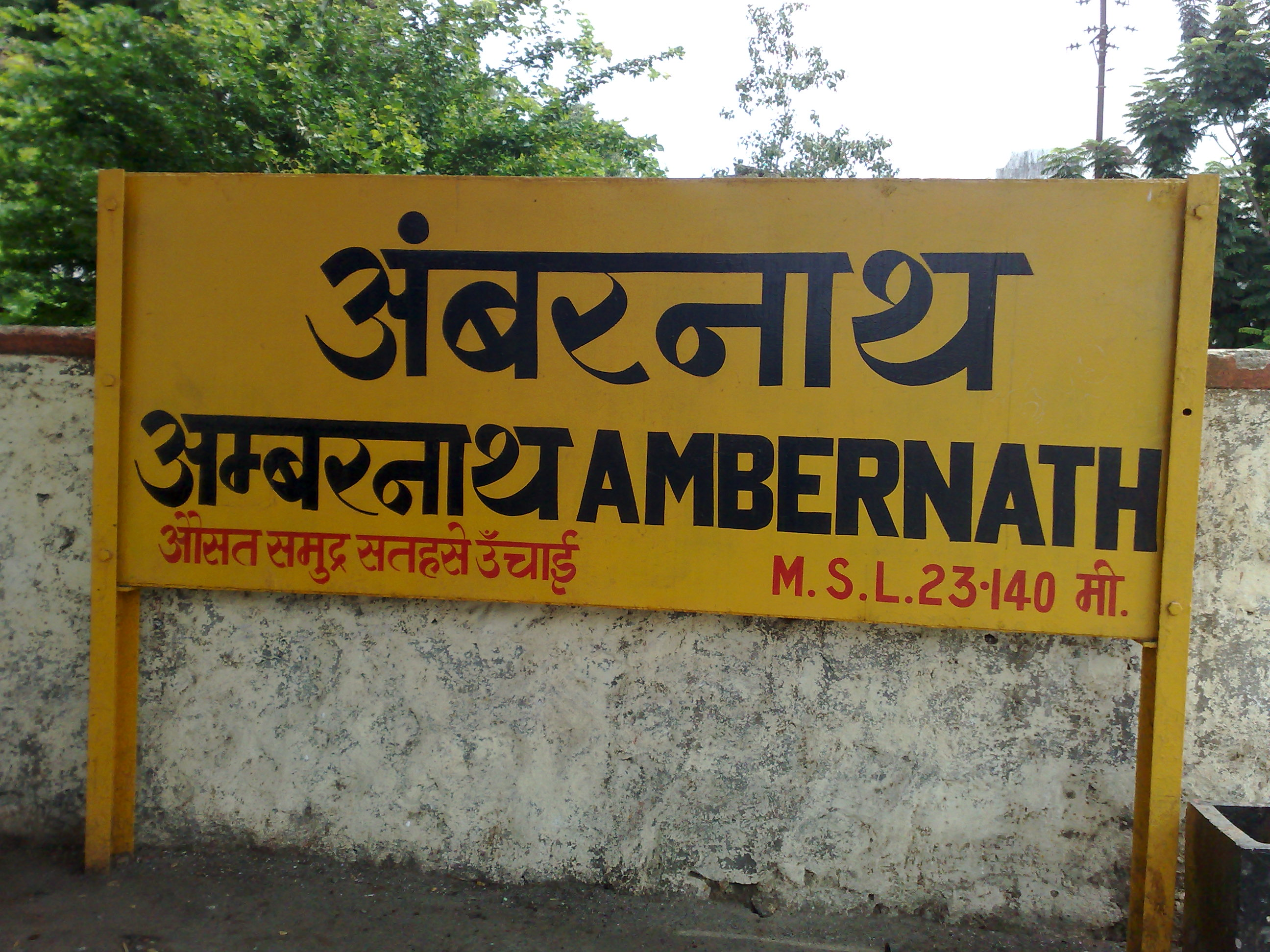
- Ambernath railway station Board

General information
- Coordinates: 19.209°N 73.186°E
- Elevation: 23.140 metres (75.92 ft)
- System: Indian Railways and Mumbai Suburban Railway station
- Owner: Ministry of Railways, Indian Railways
- Line: Central Line
- Platforms: 3
- Tracks: 3

Construction
- Structure type: Standard on-ground station
- Parking: Government Pay and Park available on both east and west
- Cycle facilities: No

Other information
- Status: Active
- Station code: ABH
- Fare zone: Central Railways

Services
Preceding station	Mumbai Suburban Railway	Following station
Ulhasnagar towards Chhatrapati Shivaji Terminus	Central line	Badlapur towards Khopoli
Route map
Location
- Location within India Location within Maharashtra

Ambarnath railway station (also spelt Ambernath, station code: ABH) is a railway station on the Central line of the Mumbai Suburban Railway network. It is an important terminus for local commuters.

Ambarnath is famous for its namesake Ambreshwar mandir, a temple dedicated to Shiva and therefore commonly known as Shivmandir. This temple was built in 1060 CE and is included in the small list of historically very important places in India by UNESCO.

== Gallery ==
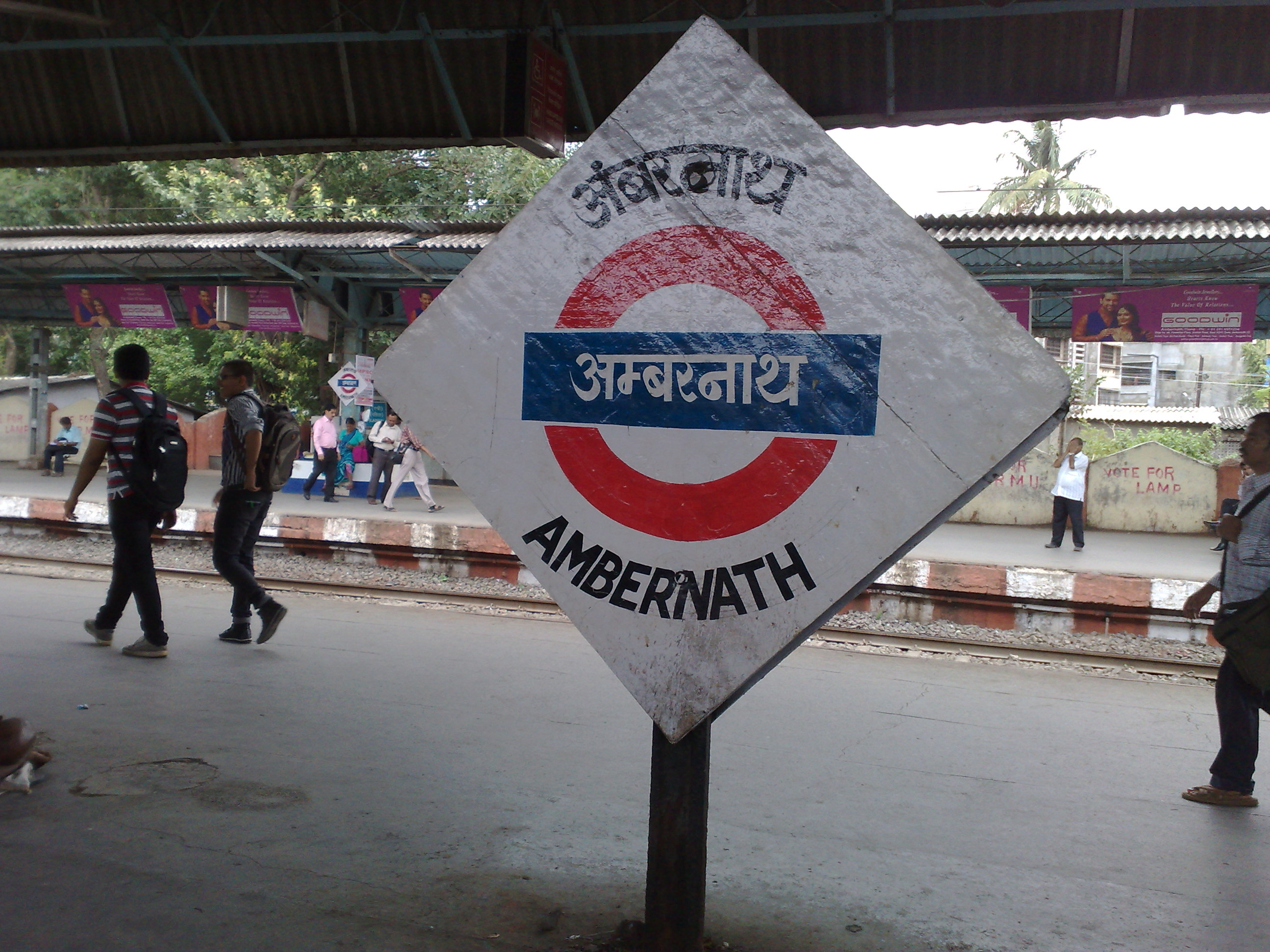
Ambernath railway station

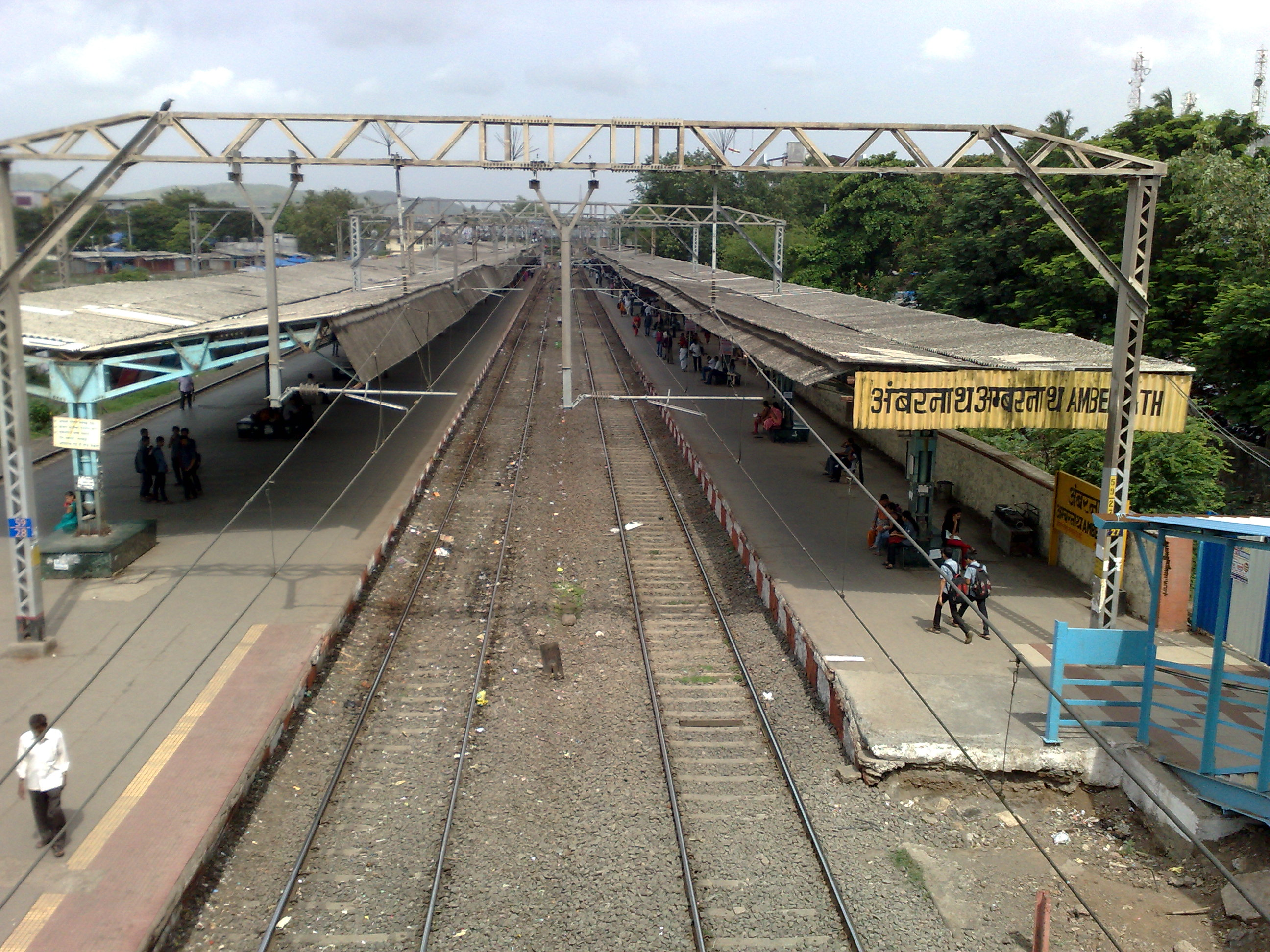
Ambernath railway station - overview

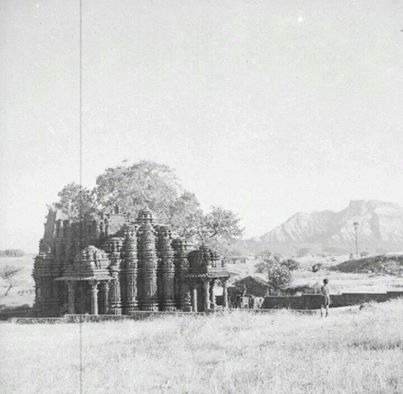
Shiv Mandir Ambarnath
