= Central line (Mumbai Suburban Railway) =

Railway line in Mumbai, India

Central line

Overview
- Owner: Indian Railway
- Locale: Mumbai City, Mumbai Suburban, Thane, Raigad, Maharashtra
- Termini: Chhatrapati Shivaji Maharaj Terminus; Kasara (northeast), Khopoli (southeast)
- Stations: 62

Service
- System: Mumbai Suburban Railway
- Operator: Central Railway (CR)
- Depot(s): Kurla, Kalwa, Matunga
- Rolling stock: Siemens, Bombardier, Medha
- Daily ridership: 3.9 million

History
- Opened: 16 April 1853; 173 years ago

Technical
- Line length: 180 km (110 mi)
- Character: At Grade
- Track gauge: 5 ft 6 in (1,676 mm) broad gauge
- Electrification: 25,000 V AC; 1500 V DC (until 8 June 2015)

The Central line of the Mumbai Suburban Railway is a public transit system serving Mumbai, Maharashtra, India. It consists of 24 stations, from Chhatrapati Shivaji Maharaj Terminus (formerly Victoria Terminus) to Kalyan Junction. The entire line is at grade. It has section of quadruple track starting from Chhatrapati Shivaji Maharaj Terminus and ends at Kasara and Khopoli in Maharashtra.

The Central line in Mumbai consists of three major corridors, which bifurcate as they run into suburban satellite towns. Two corridors (one local and other through) on the Central Railway run from CSMT to Kalyan Junction (55 km), from where it bifurcates into two lines – one to Kasara (67 km) in the northeast and the other to Khopoli (61 km) in the southeast. These two corridors constitute the 'Main' Line. The Central main line shares one station with the Western main line at Dadar. They consist of a fleet of Siemens, Medha as well as Bombardier EMUs.

The major car sheds on this line are at Kurla and Kalwa. There are fast and slow locals here for suburban service. Slow locals halt at every station, while fast locals halts vary between Byculla, Dadar, Kurla, Ghatkopar, Vikhroli, Bhandup, Mulund, Thane, Diva, Dombivli and Kalyan Junction. All services plying beyond this junction run slow. Trains usually start from and terminate at important stations.

== Stations ==
Names in bold indicate that the station is a fast train stop as well as important terminal.

=== Main line ===
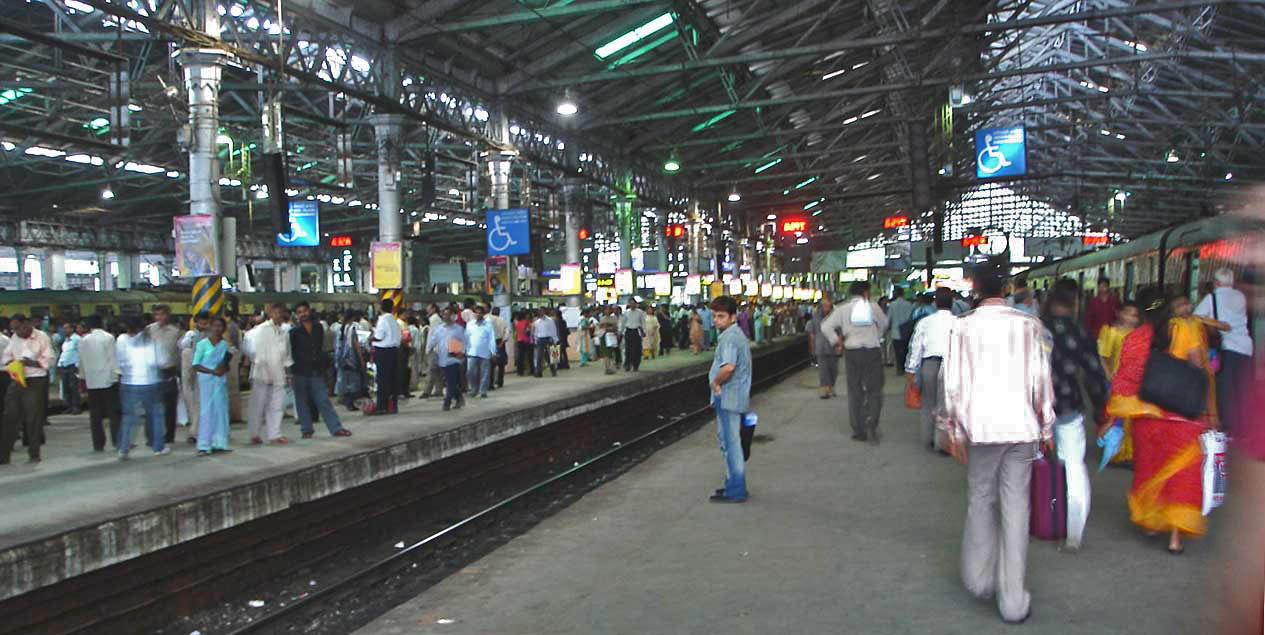
Inside Mumbai CSMT station

Central line (Main)
Distance from CSMT (km)	Station Name		Station Code	Connections
Distance from CSMT (km)	English	Marathi	Station Code	Connections
0	**Chhatrapati Shivaji Maharaj Terminus**	**छत्रपती शिवाजी महाराज टर्मिनस**	ST / CSMT	Harbour; Indian Railways; Aqua Line
1	Masjid	मशीद	MSD	Harbour
2	Sandhurst Road	सँडहर्स्ट रोड	SNRD	Harbour
4	**Byculla**	**भायखळा**	BY	None
5	Chinchpokli	चिंचपोकळी	CHP	None
6	Currey Road	करी रोड	CRD	None
8	**Parel**	**परळ**	PR	Western Prabhadevi^{†}
9	**Dadar**	**दादर**	D/DR	Western and Indian Railways
11	Matunga	माटुंगा	MTN	Western Matunga Road^{*}
13	Sion	शीव	SIN	None
15	**Kurla**	**कुर्ला**	C/CLA	Harbour
18	Vidyavihar	विद्याविहार	VVH	None
21	**Ghatkopar**	**घाटकोपर**	G/GC	Blue Line
23	**Vikhroli**	**विक्रोळी**	VK	None
25	Kanjur Marg	कांजुर मार्ग	KJRD	Pink Line
26	**Bhandup**	**भांडुप**	BND	None
28	Nahur	नाहूर	NHU	None
32	**Mulund**	**मुलुंड**	MLND	None
34	**Thane**	**ठाणे**	T/TNA	Trans-Harbour; Indian Railways Thane Junction
36	Kalwa	कळवा	KLVA	None
40	Mumbra	मुंब्रा	MBQ	None
43	**Diva Junction**	**दिवा जंक्शन**	DIVA	Vasai Road–Roha and Indian Railways
47	Kopar	कोपर	KOPR	Vasai Road–Roha
48	**Dombivli**	**डोंबिवली**	DI	None
50	Thakurli	ठाकुर्ली	THK	None
54	**Kalyan Junction**	**कल्याण जंक्शन**	K/KYN	Central line (Branch); Indian Railways Orange Line

† A footbridge links Parel to Prabhadevi on the Western line called the Prabhadevi–Parel Foot Overbridge, and it historically linked to the demolished Elphinstone Bridge. * A footbridge links Matunga to Matunga Road on the Western line, called Matunga Z bridge.

=== Branch Line ===
The main line of the Mumbai Suburban Railway runs from CSMT to Kalyan. It then splits into two corridors one going to Khopoli and other to Kasara.

South-East Section
#	Station Name		Station Code	Connections
#	English	Marathi	Station Code	Connections
26	**Kalyan Junction^{†}**	**कल्याण जंक्शन**	K/KYN	Central line (Main) and Indian Railways
27	Vithalwadi	विठ्ठलवाडी	VLDI	None
28	Ulhasnagar	उल्हासनगर	ULNR	None
29	**Ambarnath**	**अंबरनाथ**	A/ABH	None
30	Chikhloli	चिखलोली	CHLI	None
31	**Badlapur**	**बदलापूर**	BL/BUD	None
32	Vangani	वांगणी	VGI	None
33	Shelu	शेलू	SHLU	None
34	**Neral Junction**	**नेरळ जंक्शन**	NR/NRL	Matheran Hill Railway and Indian Railways
35	Bhivpuri Road	भिवपुरी रोड	BVS	None
36	**Karjat**	**कर्जत**	S/KJT	Panvel-Karjat Railway Corridor and Indian Railways
37	Palasdhari	पळसधरी	PDI	None
38	Kelavli	केळवली	KLY	None
39	Dolavli	डोळवली	DLV	None
40	Lowjee	लौजी	LWJ	None
41	**Khopoli**	**खोपोली**	KP/KHPL	None
† – Branch Line starts at Kalyan Junction

North-East Section
#	Station Name		Station Code	Connections
#	English	Marathi	Station Code	Connections
26	**Kalyan Junction^{†}**	**कल्याण जंक्शन**	K/KYN	Central line (Main) and Indian Railways
27	Shahad	शहाड	SHAD	None
28	Ambivli	आंबिवली	ABY	None
29	**Titwala**	**टिटवाळा**	TL/TWL	None
30	Khadavli	खडावली	KDV	None
31	Vasind	वाशिंद	VSD	None
32	**Asangaon**	**आसनगाव**	AN/ASO	None
33	Atgaon	आटगाव	ATG	None
34	Thansit	तानशेत	THS	None
35	Khardi	खर्डी	KE	None
36	Umbermali	उंबरमाळी	OMB	None
37	**Kasara**	**कसारा**	N/KSRA	Indian Railways
† – Branch Line starts at Kalyan Junction

== History ==
The first passenger train in India from Chhatrapati Shivaji Maharaj Terminus (Bori Bunder railway station) in Mumbai to Thane ran on 16 April 1853 on the track laid by the Great Indian Peninsula Railway. The GIPR line was extended to Kalyan in 1854 and then on the north-east side to Igatpuri and the south-east side to Khopoli via Palasdhari at the foot of the Western Ghats in 1856.

== Electrification ==
Railway electrification in India began with the first electric train, between Bombay Victoria Terminus and Kurla by the Great Indian Peninsula Railway (GIPR) on 3 February 1925, on 1.5 kV DC. The Kalyan–Pune section was electrified with 1.5 kV DC overhead system in 1930.

=== Timeline of conversion from 1.5 kV DC to 25 kV AC ===
Here are the following sections that were converted from 1.5 kV DC to 25 kV AC:

Section	Date of conversion
Igatpuri-Kasara(incl)	19 February 2006
Kasara(excl)-Khadavli(incl)-Titwala(excl)	12 November 2006
Khadavli(excl)-Titwala(incl)-Kalyan freight yard Kalyan-Diva 5th+6th lines	3 May 2009
Lonavala(incl)-Karjat(incl) Karjat(excl)-Khopoli Karjat(excl)-Vangani(incl)-Badlapur(excl)	2 May 2010
Vangani(excl)-Badlapur(incl)-Kalyan(excl)	24 October 2010
Kalyan(incl)-Diva(incl)-Mumbra(excl) slow lines Kalyan (incl)-Thane(incl)-Mulund(excl) fast lines Thane-LTT 5th+6th lines including freight yards at Mulund & Vidyavihar	12 January 2014
Diva(excl)-Mumbra(incl)-CST slow lines including EMU carsheds at Kurla & Kalva as well as Matunga Workshop Thane(excl)-Mulund(incl)-CST fast lines	8 June 2015

== Services ==
Since November 2011, all services on the Central line have been running on 12 cars. In preparation for introducing 15 car services, CR extended platforms at Byculla, Kurla, Ghatkopar, Bhandup, Mulund and Dombivli stations, from the current 270 metres to 330 metres, in order to accommodate 15 coach trains. The total cost of the work was estimated at ₹37.5 million (US$390,000). The first 15-car service, on the Central line, departed from Chhatrapati Shivaji Terminus to Kalyan at 7:33 pm IST on 16 October 2012. As of March 2014, 75 rakes operate 825 services on the Central line daily, of which 809 are 12-car and 16 are 15-car services.

== 15 Coach ==
Services	Days	Started from	Ref.
16	Mon-Sat	15 October 2012	
6	Mon-Sat	4 March 2019	
10	Daily	20 July 2026	
14	Daily	15 August 2026	
8	Daily	15 August 2026	
54	Total		

Up services
Sr No	Train No.	Departure	Origin	Arrival	Destination	Type
1	95002	4:50	Khopoli	7:01	Dadar	Fast
1	Halts: Slow till Kalyan onwards Dombivli, Diva, Thane, Mulund, Ghatkopar, Kurla					
2	95802	6:14	Dombivli	7:14	CSMT	Fast
2	Halts: Thane, Bhandup, Ghatkopar, Kurla, Dadar, Byculla					
3	95704	7:18	Kalyan	8:26	CSMT	Fast
3	Halts: Dombivli, Thane, Mulund, Ghatkopar, Kurla, Dadar, Byculla					
4	95306	7:51	Ambarnath	9:09	CSMT	Fast
4	Halts: Slow till Kalyan onwards Dombivli, Thane, Bhandup, Ghatkopar, Kurla, Dadar, Byculla					
5	95310	8:27	Ambarnath	9:44	CSMT	Fast
5	Halts: Slow till Kalyan onwards Dombivli, Kalva, Thane, Bhandup, Ghatkopar, Kurla, Dadar, Byculla					
6	95712	8:33	Kalyan	9:37	CSMT	Fast
6	Halts: Dombivli, Thane, Mulund, Ghatkopar, Kurla, Dadar, Byculla					
7	95720	9:47	Kalyan	10:40	Dadar	Fast
7	Halts: Dombivli, Thane, Ghatkopar, Kurla					
8	96008	10:00	Khopoli	10:25	Karjat	Slow
9	95912	10:46	Thane	11:29	CSMT	Fast
9	Halts: Mulund, Ghatkopar, Kurla, Dadar, Byculla					
10	96312	11:03	Ambarnath	12:21	CSMT	Fast
10	Halts: Slow till Kalyan onwards Dombivli, Thane, Ghatkopar, Kurla, Dadar, Byculla					
11	96010	11:20	Khopoli	11:45	Karjat	Slow
12	95728	11:46	Kalyan	12:48	CSMT	Fast
12	Halts: Dombivli, Thane, Ghatkopar, Kurla, Dadar, Byculla					
13	95124	12:23	Karjat	14:20	CSMT	Fast
13	Halts: Slow till Kalyan onwards Dombivli, Diva, Thane, Ghatkopar, Kurla, Dadar, Byculla					
14	96012	12:40	Khopoli	13:05	Karjat	Slow
15	95730	13:36	Kalyan	14:41	CSMT	Fast
15	Halts: Dombivli, Thane, Ghatkopar, Kurla, Dadar, Byculla					
16	95008	13:48	Khopoli	16:14	CSMT	Fast
16	Halts: Slow till Kalyan onwards Dombivli, Thane, Ghatkopar, Kurla, Dadar, Byculla					
17	95732	14:02	Kalyan	15:08	CSMT	Fast
17	Halts: Dombivli, Thane, Ghatkopar, Kurla, Dadar, Byculla					
18	95734	16:28	Kalyan	17:20	Dadar	Fast
18	Halts: Dombivli, Thane, Ghatkopar, Kurla					
19	95230	16:47	Badlapur	18:10	CSMT	Fast
19	Halts: Slow till Kalyan onwards Dombivli, Thane, Ghatkopar, Kurla, Dadar, Byculla					
20	95134	17:33	Karjat	19:34	CSMT	Fast
20	Halts: Slow till Kalyan onwards Dombivli, Thane, Ghatkopar, Kurla, Dadar, Byculla					
21	95236	18:17	Badlapur	19:44	CSMT	Fast
21	Halts: Slow till Kalyan onwards Dombivli, Thane, Bhandup, Ghatkopar, Kurla, Dadar, Byculla					
22	95742	18:22	Kalyan	19:25	CSMT	Fast
22	Halts: Dombivli, Thane, Ghatkopar, Kurla, Dadar, Byculla					
23	95142	20:38	Karjat	22:41	CSMT	Fast
23	Halts: Slow till Kalyan onwards Dombivli, Thane, Mulund, Ghatkopar, Kurla, Dadar, Byculla					
24	95746	20:41	Kalyan	21:30	Dadar	Fast
24	Halts: Dombivli, Thane, Ghatkopar, Kurla					
25	95344	21:07	Ambarnath	22:11	Dadar	Fast
25	Halts: Slow till Kalyan onwards Dombivli, Thane, Ghatkopar, Kurla					
26	95146	22:03	Karjat	23:59	CSMT	Fast
26	Halts: Slow till Kalyan onwards Dombivli, Diva, Thane, Ghatkopar, Kurla, Dadar, Byculla					
27	95748	23:15	Kalyan	00:22	CSMT	Fast
27	Halts: Dombivli, Thane, Mulund, Ghatkopar, Kurla, Dadar, Byculla					

Down services
Sr No	Train No.	Departure	Origin	Arrival	Destination	Type
1	95703	6:06	CSMT	7:10	Kalyan	Fast
1	Halts: Byculla, Dadar, Kurla, Ghatkopar, Thane, Dombivli					
2	95705	7:22	CSMT	8:25	Kalyan	Fast
2	Halts: Byculla, Dadar, Kurla, Ghatkopar, Bhandup, Thane, Dombivli					
3	95003	7:43	Dadar	9:51	Khopoli	Fast
3	Halts: Kurla, Ghatkopar, Mulund, Thane, Dombivli, Kalyan onwards Slow					
4	95709	8:36	CSMT	9:40	Kalyan	Fast
4	Halts: Byculla, Dadar, Kurla, Ghatkopar, Mulund, Thane, Dombivli					
5	95305	9:15	CSMT	10:34	Ambarnath	Fast
5	Halts: Byculla, Dadar, Kurla, Ghatkopar, Bhandup, Thane, Dombivli, Kalyan onwards Slow					
6	95907	9:42	CSMT	10:24	Thane	Fast
6	Halts: Dadar, Kurla, Ghatkopar, Mulund					
7	95113	9:57	CSMT	11:55	Karjat	Fast
7	Halts: Byculla, Dadar, Kurla, Ghatkopar, Thane, Diva, Dombivli, Kalyan onwards Slow					
8	96005	10:40	Karjat	11:05	Khopoli	Slow
9	95715	10:45	Dadar	11:36	Kalyan	Fast
9	Halts: Kurla, Ghatkopar, Thane, Dombivli					
10	95801	11:37	CSMT	12:32	Dombivli	Fast
10	Halts: Byculla, Dadar, Kurla, Ghatkopar, Bhandup, Thane					
11	96007	12:00	Karjat	12:25	Khopoli	Slow
12	95717	12:26	CSMT	13:30	Kalyan	Fast
12	Halts: Byculla, Dadar, Kurla, Ghatkopar, Thane, Dombivli					
13	95719	12:53	CSMT	13:57	Kalyan	Fast
13	Halts: Byculla, Dadar, Kurla, Ghatkopar, Thane, Dombivli					
14	96009	13:15	Karjat	13:40	Khopoli	Slow
15	95123	14:45	CSMT	16:42	Karjat	Fast
15	Halts: Byculla, Dadar, Kurla, Ghatkopar, Thane, Diva, Dombivli, Kalyan onwards Slow					
16	95231	15:03	CSMT	16:27	Badlapur	Fast
16	Halts: Byculla, Dadar, Kurla, Ghatkopar, Thane, Dombivli, Kalyan onwards Slow					
17	95721	15:14	CSMT	16:20	Kalyan	Fast
17	Halts: Byculla, Dadar, Kurla, Ghatkopar, Thane, Dombivli					
18	95235	16:42	CSMT	18:07	Badlapur	Fast
18	Halts: Byculla, Dadar, Kurla, Ghatkopar, Thane, Diva, Dombivli, Kalyan onwards Slow					
19	95725	17:30	Dadar	18:18	Kalyan	Fast
19	Halts: Kurla, Ghatkopar, Mulund, Thane, Dombivli					
20	95129	18:21	CSMT	20:13	Karjat	Fast
20	Halts: Byculla, Dadar, Kurla, Ghatkopar, Thane, Diva, Dombivli, Kalyan onwards Slow					
21	95739	19:29	CSMT	20:32	Kalyan	Fast
21	Halts: Byculla, Dadar, Kurla, Ghatkopar, Mulund, Thane, Dombivli					
22	95331	19:42	CSMT	21:01	Ambarnath	Fast
22	Halts: Byculla, Dadar, Kurla, Ghatkopar, Bhandup, Thane, Diva, Dombivli, Kalyan onwards Slow					
23	95133	19:50	CSMT	21:51	Karjat	Fast
23	Halts: Byculla, Dadar, Kurla, Ghatkopar, Mulund, Thane, Dombivli, Kalyan onwards Slow					
24	95743	22:18	Dadar	23:10	Kalyan	Fast
24	Halts: Kurla, Ghatkopar, Mulund, Thane, Dombivli					
25	95017	22:57	CSMT	1:30	Khopoli	Fast
25	Halts: Byculla, Dadar, Kurla, Ghatkopar, Thane, Dombivli, Kalyan onwards Slow					
26	96341	23:23	Dadar	00:30	Ambarnath	Fast
26	Halts: Kurla, Ghatkopar, Thane, Dombivli, Kalyan onwards Slow					
27	95337	00:05	CSMT	1:27	Ambarnath	Fast
27	Halts: Byculla, Dadar, Kurla, Ghatkopar, Thane, Dombivli, Kalyan onwards Slow					

== AC Local ==
Services	Days	Started from	Ref.
12	Mon-Sat	17 December 2020	
16	Daily	19 February 2022	
13	Mon-Sat	19 February 2022	
13	Mon-Sat	14 May 2022	
12	Mon-Sat	6 November 2023	
14	Mon-Fri	16 April 2025	
12	Mon-Sat	29 June 2026	
92	Total		

Up services
Sr No	Train No.	Departure	Origin	Arrival	Destination	Type
1	97604	4:46	Kurla	5:16	CSMT	Slow
2	97310	5:24	Thane	6:21	CSMT	Slow
3	95702	6:32	Kalyan	7:39	CSMT	Fast
3	Halts: Dombivli, Thane, Ghatkopar, Kurla, Dadar, Byculla					
4	96612	6:46	Titwala	8:31	CSMT	Slow
5	97329	7:04	Thane	8:00	CSMT	Slow
6	97022	7:15	Kalyan	8:45	CSMT	Slow
7	97026	7:34	Kalyan	9:05	CSMT	Slow
8	95904	8:05	Thane	8:50	CSMT	Fast
8	Halts: Mulund, Vikhroli, Kurla, Dadar, Byculla					
9	96618	8:33	Titwala	10:18	CSMT	Slow
10	95714	8:54	Kalyan	9:59	CSMT	Fast
10	Halts: Dombivli, Thane, Mulund, Ghatkopar, Kurla, Dadar, Byculla					
11	95908	9:03	Thane	9:47	CSMT	Fast
11	Halts: Mulund, Ghatkopar, Kurla, Dadar, Byculla					
12	97502	9:16	Ghatkopar	9:53	CSMT	Slow
13	95724	10:02	Kalyan	10:52	Dadar	Fast
13	Halts: Dombivli, Thane, Ghatkopar, Kurla					
14	97048	10:25	Kalyan	11:54	CSMT	Slow
15	95210	10:42	Badlapur	12:12	CSMT	Fast
15	Halts: Slow till Kalyan onwards Dombivli, Diva, Thane, Ghatkopar, Kurla, Dadar, Byculla					
16	96314	11:17	Ambarnath	13:02	CSMT	Slow
17	95726	11:22	Kalyan	12:15	Dadar	Fast
17	Halts: Dombivli, Diva, Thane, Ghatkopar, Kurla					
18	97218	11:48	Dombivli	13:10	CSMT	Slow
19	95214	12:27	Badlapur	13:38	Dadar	Fast
19	Halts: Slow till Kalyan onwards Dombivli, Thane, Ghatkopar, Kurla					
20	97366	13:28	Thane	14:25	CSMT	Slow
21	95218	13:48	Badlapur	14:59	Dadar	Fast
21	Halts: Slow till Kalyan onwards Dombivli, Thane, Ghatkopar, Kurla					
22	96324	14:00	Ambarnath	15:47	CSMT	Slow
23	97370	14:22	Thane	15:20	CSMT	Slow
24	95914	15:03	Thane	15:45	CSMT	Fast
24	Halts: Ghatkopar, Kurla, Dadar, Byculla					
25	95324	15:12	Ambarnath	16:31	CSMT	Fast
25	Halts: Slow till Kalyan onwards Dombivli, Thane, Bhandup, Ghatkopar, Kurla, Dadar, Byculla					
26	97378	15:36	Thane	16:34	CSMT	Slow
27	97618	16:34	Kurla	17:08	CSMT	Slow
28	95610	16:47	Titwala	18:06	CSMT	Fast
28	Halts: Slow till Kalyan onwards Dombivli, Thane, Ghatkopar, Kurla, Dadar, Byculla					
29	97236	16:55	Dombivli	18:14	CSMT	Slow
30	95738	17:27	Kalyan	18:30	CSMT	Fast
30	Halts: Dombivli, Thane, Ghatkopar, Kurla, Dadar, Byculla					
31	97240	17:32	Dombivli	18:38	Parel	Slow
32	97402	17:41	Thane	18:40	CSMT	Slow
33	97408	18:16	Thane	19:14	CSMT	Slow
34	95336	18:30	Ambarnath	19:32	Dadar	Fast
34	Halts: Slow till Kalyan onwards Dombivli, Thane, Mulund, Ghatkopar, Kurla					
35	97416	18:57	Thane	19:55	CSMT	Slow
36	97424	19:49	Thane	20:48	CSMT	Slow
37	97252	19:50	Dombivli	21:12	CSMT	Slow
38	97152	19:56	Kalyan	21:28	CSMT	Slow
39	97154	20:10	Kalyan	21:25	Parel	Slow
40	95342	20:50	Ambarnath	22:07	CSMT	Fast
40	Halts: Slow till Kalyan onwards Dombivli, Thane, Ghatkopar, Kurla, Dadar, Byculla					
41	97164	21:04	Kalyan	22:03	Kurla	Slow
42	97168	21:36	Kalyan	23:05	CSMT	Slow
43	97630	22:22	Kurla	22:53	CSMT	Slow
44	97176	22:56	Kalyan	23:55	Kurla	Slow
45	97178	23:04	Kalyan	23:35	Thane	Slow
46	96228	23:04	Badlapur	00:26	Kurla	Slow
47	97180	23:19	Kalyan	23:50	Thane	Slow

Down services
Sr No	Train No.	Departure	Origin	Arrival	Destination	Type
1	95701	5:20	CSMT	6:24	Kalyan	Fast
1	Halts: Byculla, Dadar, Kurla, Ghatkopar, Thane, Dombivli					
2	96603	5:35	Thane	6:23	Titwala	Slow
3	97009	6:05	Vidyavihar	7:04	Kalyan	Slow
4	97013	6:26	Vidyavihar	7:25	Kalyan	Slow
5	96611	6:30	CSMT	8:15	Titwala	Slow
6	95707	7:43	CSMT	8:46	Kalyan	Fast
6	Halts: Byculla, Dadar, Kurla, Ghatkopar, Thane, Dombivli					
7	95901	8:04	CSMT	8:46	Thane	Fast
7	Halts: Byculla, Dadar, Kurla, Ghatkopar					
8	97501	8:37	CSMT	9:12	Ghatkopar	Slow
9	97041	8:49	CSMT	10:18	Kalyan	Slow
10	95711	8:56	CSMT	9:58	Kalyan	Fast
10	Halts: Byculla, Dadar, Kurla, Ghatkopar, Bhandup, Thane, Dombivli					
11	95209	9:09	CSMT	10:32	Badlapur	Fast
11	Halts: Byculla, Dadar, Kurla, Ghatkopar, Vikhroli, Mulund, Thane, Dombivli, Kalyan onwards Slow					
12	95307	9:51	CSMT	11:08	Ambarnath	Fast
12	Halts: Byculla, Dadar, Kurla, Vikhroli, Mulund, Thane, Dombivli, Kalyan onwards Slow					
13	97615	10:00	CSMT	10:28	Kurla	Slow
14	95713	10:04	CSMT	11:07	Kalyan	Fast
14	Halts: Byculla, Dadar, Kurla, Ghatkopar, Thane, Dombivli					
15	97217	10:22	CSMT	11:40	Dombivli	Slow
16	95221	11:08	Dadar	12:21	Badlapur	Fast
16	Halts: Kurla, Ghatkopar, Thane, Dombivli, Kalyan onwards Slow					
17	96313	11:58	CSMT	13:44	Ambarnath	Slow
18	97359	12:24	CSMT	13:20	Thane	Slow
19	95225	12:30	Dadar	13:39	Badlapur	Fast
19	Halts: Kurla, Ghatkopar, Thane, Dombivli, Kalyan onwards Slow					
20	97363	13:06	CSMT	14:06	Thane	Slow
21	96317	13:15	CSMT	15:02	Ambarnath	Slow
22	95909	14:21	Dadar	14:47	Thane	Fast
22	Halts: Kurla, Ghatkopar					
23	97369	14:29	CSMT	15:25	Thane	Slow
24	97235	15:24	CSMT	16:43	Dombivli	Slow
25	95611	15:33	Dadar	16:39	Titwala	Fast
25	Halts: Kurla, Ghatkopar, Thane, Dombivli, Kalyan onwards Slow					
26	97239	16:00	CSMT	17:20	Dombivli	Slow
27	95723	16:11	CSMT	17:19	Kalyan	Fast
27	Halts: Byculla, Dadar, Kurla, Ghatkopar, Thane, Dombivli					
28	97383	16:38	CSMT	17:35	Thane	Slow
29	95321	17:00	CSMT	18:23	Ambarnath	Fast
29	Halts: Dadar, Thane onwards Slow					
30	97389	17:12	CSMT	18:08	Thane	Slow
31	95911	18:10	CSMT	18:52	Thane	Fast
31	Halts: Dadar, Kurla, Bhandup, Mulund					
32	97251	18:18	CSMT	19:37	Dombivli	Slow
33	95733	18:36	CSMT	19:41	Kalyan	Fast
33	Halts: Byculla, Dadar, Kurla, Ghatkopar, Bhandup, Thane, Dombivli					
34	97149	18:45	Parel	19:58	Kalyan	Slow
35	97403	18:45	CSMT	19:42	Thane	Slow
36	97157	19:18	CSMT	20:49	Kalyan	Slow
37	95329	19:39	Dadar	20:44	Ambarnath	Fast
37	Halts: Kurla, Ghatkopar, Bhandup, Thane, Dombivli, Kalyan onwards Slow					
38	97163	20:00	CSMT	21:28	Kalyan	Slow
39	96221	21:08	CSMT	22:56	Badlapur	Slow
40	97173	21:16	CSMT	22:45	Kalyan	Slow
41	97175	21:39	Parel	22:53	Kalyan	Slow
42	95741	21:42	CSMT	23:05	Kalyan	Fast
42	Halts: Byculla, Dadar, Kurla, Ghatkopar onwards Slow					
43	97427	22:20	CSMT	23:15	Thane	Slow
44	97433	23:00	CSMT	23:57	Thane	Slow
45	97435	23:12	CSMT	00:07	Thane	Slow

== See also ==
- Mumbai Suburban Railway
- List of Mumbai Suburban Railway stations
- Central Railway zone
