= Badlapur =

- City
- Location within Maharashtra
- Coordinates: 19.15°N 73.262°E
- Country: India
- State: Maharashtra
- District: Thane

Government
  - Type: Municipal Council
  - Body: Kulgaon Badlapur Municipal Council

Area
  - Total: 35.68 km^{2} (13.78 sq mi)

Population (2011)
  - Total: 174,226
  - Estimate (as of 2024): 245,000 approx.
  - Rank: 32 in Maharashtra
  - Density: 4,833/km^{2} (12,520/sq mi)
- Demonym: Badlapurkar

Languages
  - Official: Marathi
- Time zone: UTC+5:30 (IST)
- PIN: 421 503
- Telephone code: 0251
- Vehicle registration: MH-05
- Distance from Mumbai: 67 kilometres (42 mi) (rail)
- Distance from Navi Mumbai: 44 kilometres (27 mi) (road)
- Distance from Pune: 125 kilometres (78 mi) (rail)
- Website: www.badlapurcity.com.

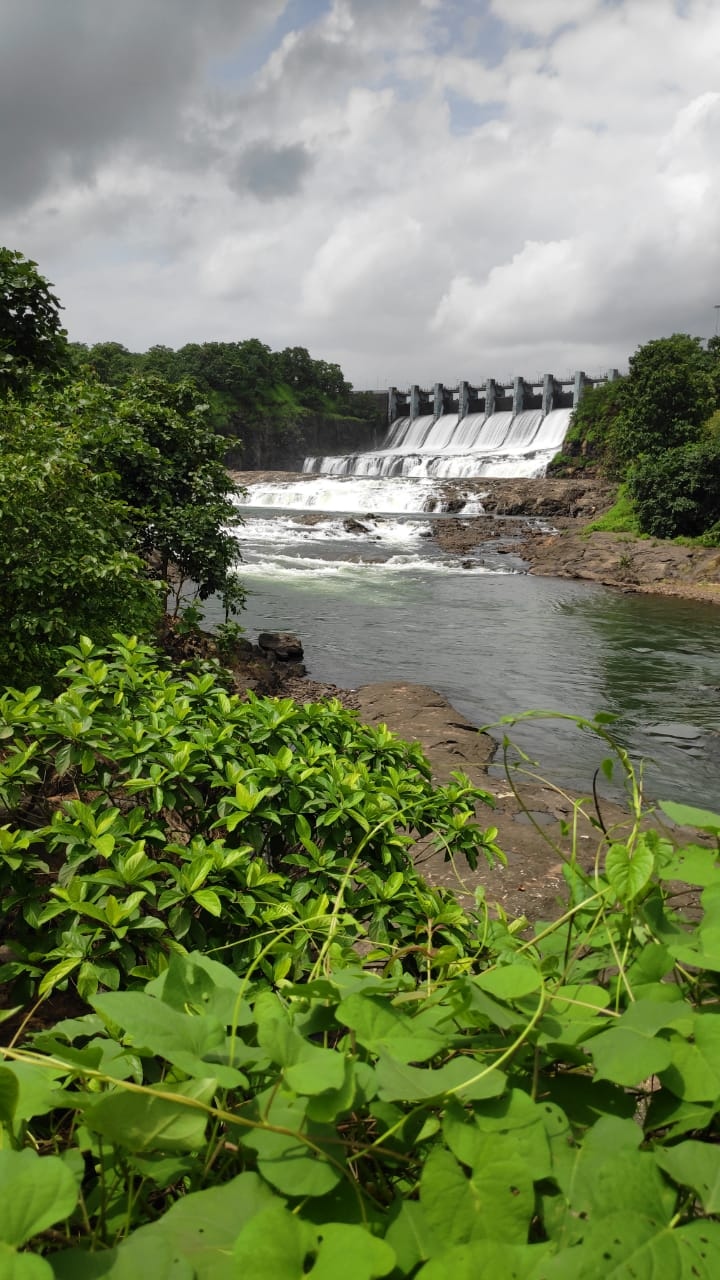
Barvi Dam at Badlapur

Badlapur (Marathi pronunciation: [bəd̪lapuːɾ]) is a city in the Thane district, Maharashtra state, India, and is a part of Mumbai Metropolitan Region. Badlapur is a city on the banks of Ulhas River in the Thane district of Maharashtra state in Konkan division. It is governed by Kulgaon-Badlapur Municipal Council. Badlapur is a city located 40 kilometres from Thane City in Thane district, Maharashtra, India. The city is a part of Mumbai Metropolitan Region managed by Municipal Council. The current estimated population of Badlapur city in 2024 is 245,000 approximately. It grew by approximately 40.62% from 2011. It has a Badlapur railway station on the Central line of the Mumbai Suburban Railway

== Climate ==
Badlapur has been ranked 38th best “National Clean Air City” under (Category 2 3-10L Population cities) in India.

== Matheran Range ==
The Matheran Range starts at Haji Malang in the north-north-west, continues to Tavli in the north, and then runs south and finally terminates at Bhivpuri Road Hill. Strictly speaking, this range is not a part of the Sahyadris, but rather runs parallel to the Badlapur-Karjat railway line to its west. The Sahyadris proper run parallel to the same railway line, but to its east.
