= Ambarnath =

Village in Maharashtra, India

Ambernath
- City; Mumbai Metropolitan City
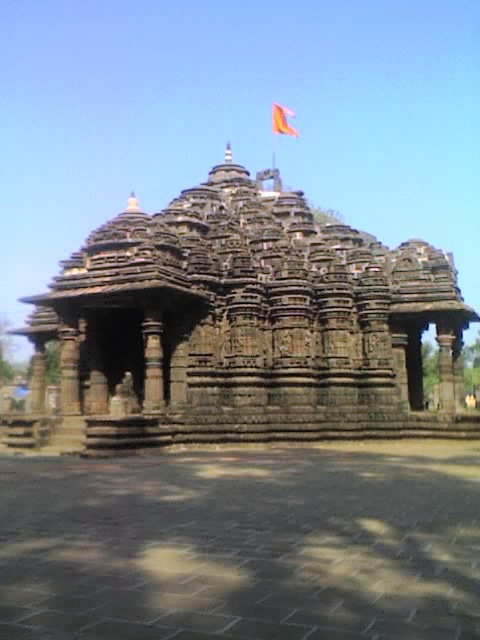
- Shiv Mandir, Ambernath

- Location of Ambernath in Maharashtra, India
- Coordinates: 19.209°N 73.186°E
- Country: India
- State: Maharashtra
- District: Thane
- Region: Mumbai
- Named for: God of sky

Government
  - Type: Municipal Council
  - Body: Ambernath Municipal Council
  - President: Tejashree Karanjule Patil

Area
  - Total: 38 km^{2} (15 sq mi)
- Elevation: 35 m (115 ft)

Population (2011)
  - Total: 253,475
  - Estimate (2024): 358,000
  - Rank: 29th (as of 2011)
  - Density: 6,700/km^{2} (17,000/sq mi)
- Time zone: UTC+5:30 (IST)
- PIN: 421501, 421502, 421505, 421506.
- Telephone code: 0251
- Vehicle registration: MH-05
- Lok Sabha constituency: Kalyan
- Member of Parliament: Shrikant Shinde (National Democratic Alliance)
- Member of Legislative Assembly: Dr. Balaji Kinikar (National Democratic Alliance)
- Vidhan Sabha constituency: Ambernath

Ambarnath (Marathi pronunciation: [əmbəɾnaːt̪ʰ]) is an eastern suburban city in Thane district of Maharashtra and is a part of the Mumbai Metropolitan Region.

== Demographics ==
Historical population
Year	Pop.	±%
1951	21,498	—
1961	34,509	+60.5%
1971	56,276	+63.1%
1981	96,347	+71.2%
2001	203,804	+111.5%
2011	253,475	+24.4%
Source: Government of India

Religion in Ambarnath (2011)
Religion	Percent
Hinduism	78.71%
Islam	10.27%
Buddhism	5.23%
Christianity	4.6%
Others	1.2%

In 2011, Ambarnath had a population of 253,475, with 132,582 Males and 120,893 Females. Its population grew by 24.4% from 2001, when it had a population of 203,804. It is overwhelmingly Hindu, with about eighty percent of the population being Hindu.

== Notable people ==
- Merwyn Fernandes, former Indian hockey player
- Farukh Choudhary, Indian footballer
- Puranik Yogendra, politician
- Kay Kay Menon, Actor
