= Prabhadevi =

- Neighbourhood
- Location within Mumbai
- Coordinates: 19.0166°N 72.8295°E
- Country: India
- State: Maharashtra
- District: Mumbai City
- City: Mumbai

Government
  - Type: Municipal Corporation
  - Body: Brihanmumbai Municipal Corporation (MCGM)

Languages
  - Official: Marathi
- Time zone: UTC+5:30 (IST)
- PIN: 400025
- Area code: 022
- Vehicle registration: MH 01
- Civic agency: BMC

Prabhadevi (Pronunciation: [pɾəbʱaːd̪eʋiː]) is a small up-scale southern neighbourhood of Mumbai, situated between Dadar to the north, Worli to the south and the Arabian Sea to the west. The area derives its name from the 300-year-old Prabhavati temple located in the locality. Prabhadevi starts at Sayani Road Junction and ends at Babasaheb Worlikar Chowk. It is known for its mix of high-end residential buildings, cultural landmarks, and historical significance. The area is most famous for the Siddhivinayak Temple, one of Mumbai’s most revered Hindu temples, attracting thousands of devotees daily.

It is situated between Dadar to the north, Worli to the south and the Arabian Sea to the west. Prabhadevi starts at Sayani Road Junction and ends at Babasaheb Worlikar Chowk.

== Landmarks ==
Prabhadevi is largely a residential area, consisting mostly of newly built apartments and high-rises.

- Prabhadevi Temple:

Prabhadevi Temple, also known as Prabhavati Devi Temple, is a Hindu temple located in the Prabhadevi area, near Dadar, Mumbai. The idol representing the main deity, Prabhavati Devi, dates back to the 12th century. The temple itself, though, was constructed in 1715, making it only 300 years old.

One of Prabhadevi's most important landmarks is Siddhivinayak Temple, which attracts thousands of devotees every day, Tuesday being the main day of prayer.

== Transportation ==
Numerous BEST buses ply in the Prabhadevi region. Prabhadevi is not directly served by the local train; the nearest station is Prabhadevi on the Western line and Parel on the Central line; which was previously known as Parel-Elphinstone Road railway station. Prabhadevi is connected to Bandra via the Bandra-Worli Sea Link.

== Notable residents ==
- Kishori Amonkar
- Deepika Padukone
- Ranveer Singh
- Sulochana Latkar
- Kunal Vijaykar
- Anant Pai

== See also ==
- Statue of Equality (disambiguation)
- Dadar
- Worli
- Western Line (Mumbai Suburban Railway)
- Siddhivinayak Temple
