= Prabhadevi railway station =

Railway station in Maharashtra, India

Prabhadevi
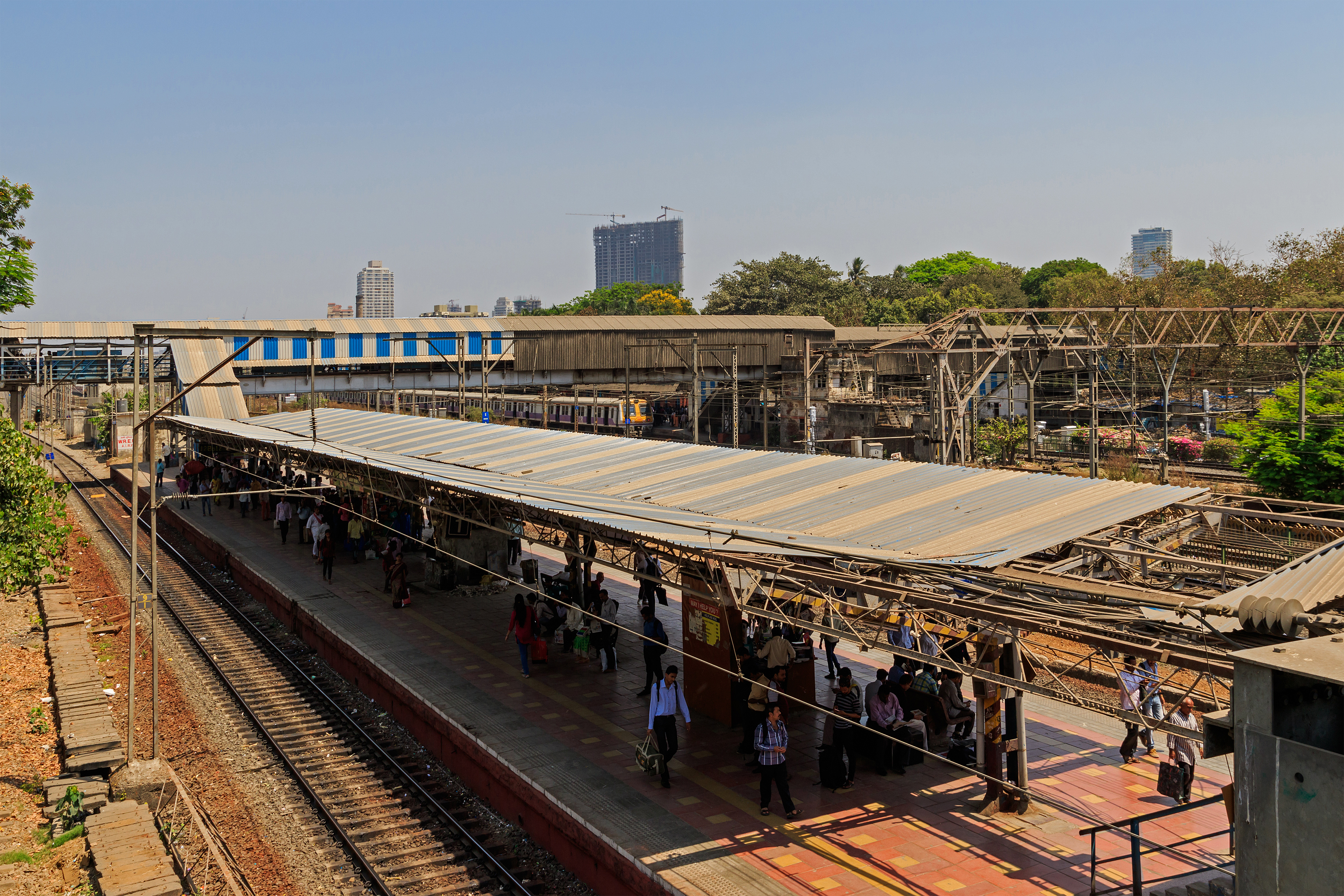
- Prabhadevi railway station

General information
- Coordinates: 19.008085°N 72.836527°E
- Elevation: 6 metres (20 ft)
- System: Indian Railways and Mumbai Suburban Railway station
- Owner: Ministry of Railways, Indian Railways
- Line: Western Line
- Platforms: 2
- Tracks: 7

Construction
- Structure type: Standard on-ground station
- Parking: No

Other information
- Status: Active
- Station code: PBHD
- Fare zone: Western Railways

History
- Former names: Elphistone Road

Passengers
- 15.6 million (Annually)

Services
Preceding station	Mumbai Suburban Railway	Following station
Lower Parel towards Churchgate	Western line	Dadar towards Dahanu Road
Currey Road towards Chhatrapati Shivaji Terminus	Central line transfer at Parel	Dadar towards Kasara or Khopoli
Route map
Location
- Location within Mumbai Location within Maharashtra Location within India

Prabhadevi railway station, formerly Elphinstone Road railway station, is an Indian railway station junction which connects the Central line to Parel of Mumbai Suburban Railway. It serves the area of Prabhadevi in Mumbai, India. This railway station has two platforms which are of only slow trains halt.

== History ==
The railway station on the Prabhadevi side was inaugurated as Elphinstone Road railway station (with station code EPR) after John, 13th Lord Elphinstone, the Governor of Bombay from 1853 to 1860.

The station formerly existed as two stations, being a quarter of a mile apart, and each station had its own issuing and collecting staff. Passengers heading in towards the south were served by the Up platform that was connected to the Caroll road over bridge (now commonly called, the Elphinstone RoB) through a staircase. Those heading northward were served by the Down platform that led to a road on the western side. When a new station was opened, this queer case was resolved. This new station built on the location of the old Up platform, which was widened and extended becoming the present island platform of the station. There was a provision of a staircase on each side, and an elevated booking office was built in level with the bridge. Passengers entered the station, passing by the booking office, and descending down the stairs. Those leaving the station would ascend the stairway on the other side, onto the RoB.

After Independence, there were demands from the local people for the railway station to be renamed to Prabhadevi. This renaming, from the 18th-century Prabhadevi Temple of Hindu goddess Prabhavati Devi located near the station, was first proposed by Shiv Sena leader Diwakar Raote in 1991.

The Maharashtra Legislature passed a resolution to that effect on 16 December 2016, followed by the Maharashtra Government sending a proposal for renaming the station to the Union Home Ministry which was approved on 6 May 2017.

After the approval, the name of Elphinstone Road railway station was officially changed to Prabhadevi railway station on 19 July 2018. with its new station code as PBHD with the approval of Indian Railways

== Passengers ==
Prabhadevi railway stations are a set of one of the busiest stations on the Mumbai Suburban Railway network. Over 15.6 million passenger's journey originates from either of these stations, earning ₹78 lakh (US$81,000) yearly, due to offices being situated around these railway stations.

== Foot-over-bridges ==
Due to the super-dense crush load on this station, two foot overbridges are constructed between the southern part of the Parel side and the northern part of the Prabhadevi side for easier interchanging between these platforms. Both of them were constructed in 2018.

Before that, there was only one foot overbridge that was narrower in width and older than 50 years, This created problems for commuters during peak hours. Due to this, commuters used to cross the tracks on to the adjoining platform 3 and use the FOB of that platform. This prompted the Railways to put up a fence between the platforms in order to stop commuters from crossing the tracks. This has increased the pressure on the overbridge even more and hence forced the Railways into assigning the Railway Protection Force and Home Guard to help commuters cross the bridge and prevent any stampedes and also help to approach trains.

For that purpose, the first foot overbridge was reconstructed by the joint operation of the Corps of Engineers of the Indian Army and Indian Railways and opened on 27 February 2018, within the time span of 117 days. Whereas the second foot overbridge was newly constructed to reduce the load on the first foot overbridge and make a second interchange on this station, Opened for the public on 18 June 2018.

=== Stampede ===
On 29 September 2017 during the morning rush-hour, a stampede occurred at the western side of foot overbridge on the Parel–Prabhadevi railway station. 23 people were killed, 19 injured and 39 suffered other injuries. The incident was classified as a case of an accident by the Mumbai Police.

== Gallery ==
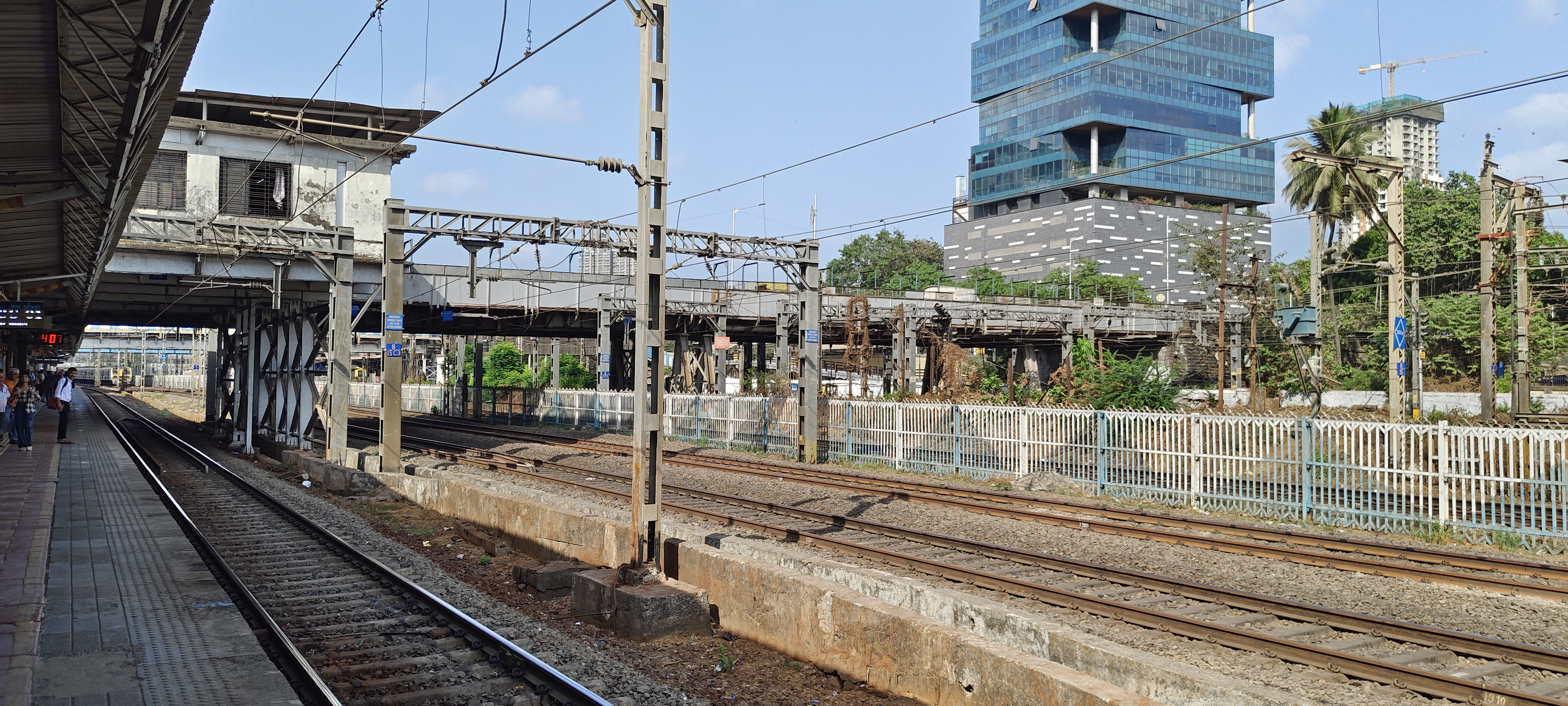
A Northward view of the Elphinstone Road Bridge

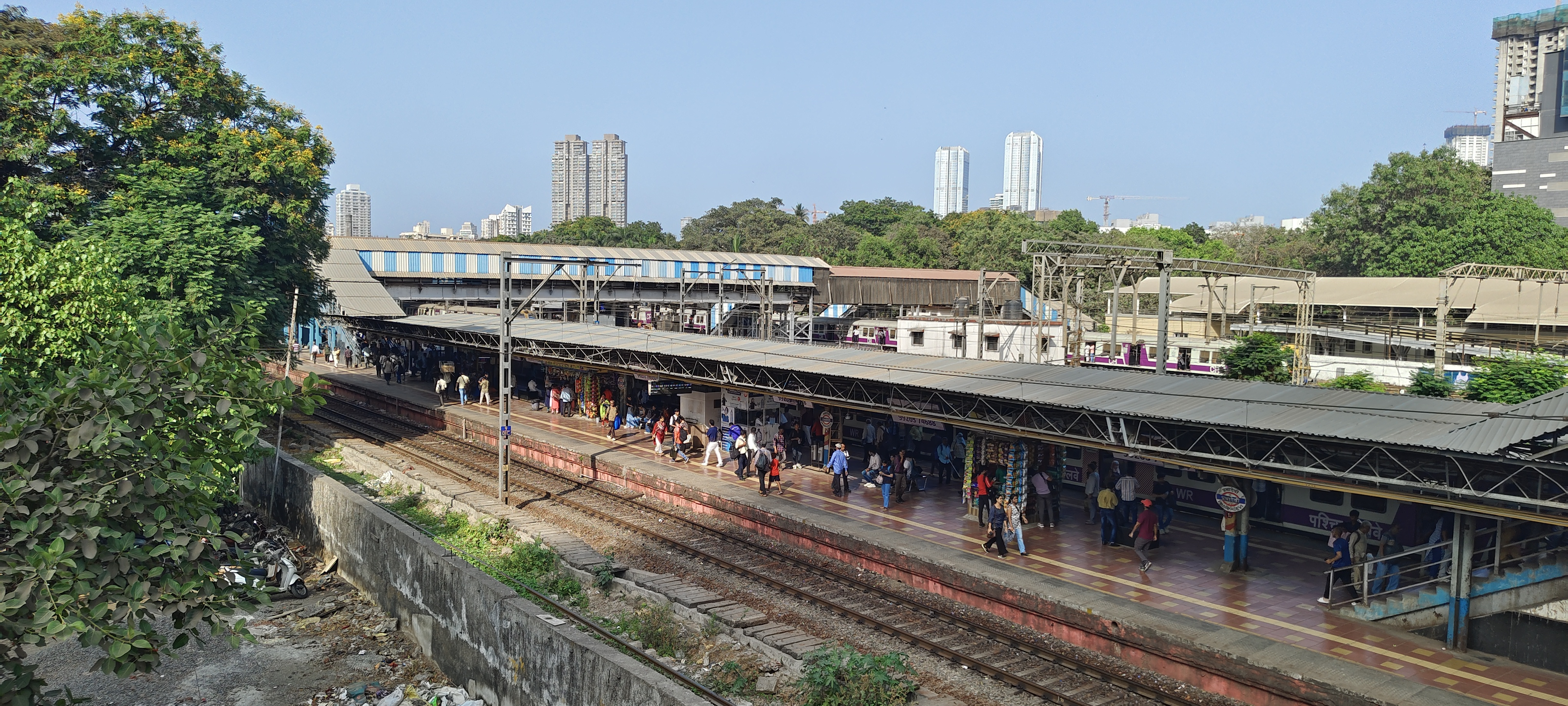
View of the platforms from the Elphinstone Bridge

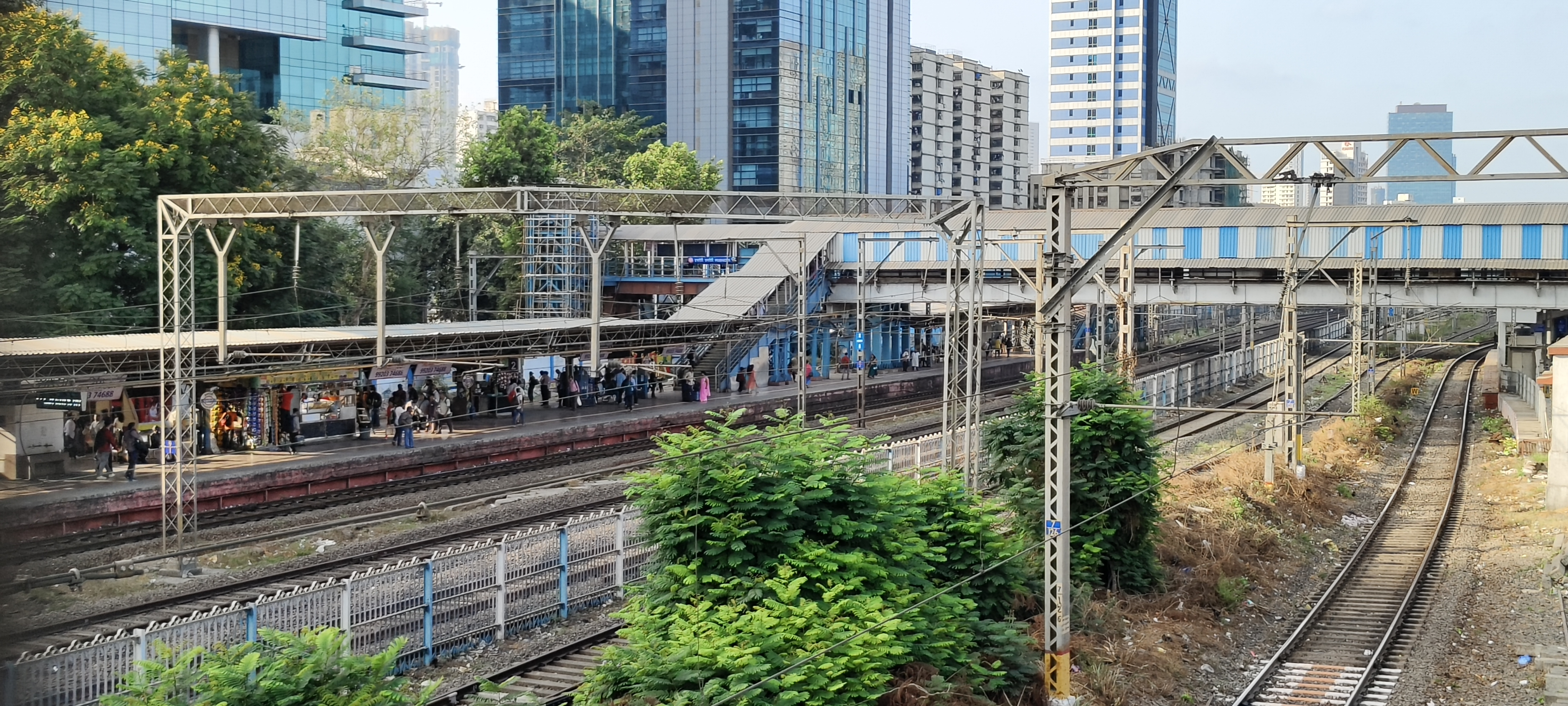
View of Prabhadevi stn from Elphinstone Rd. Bridge

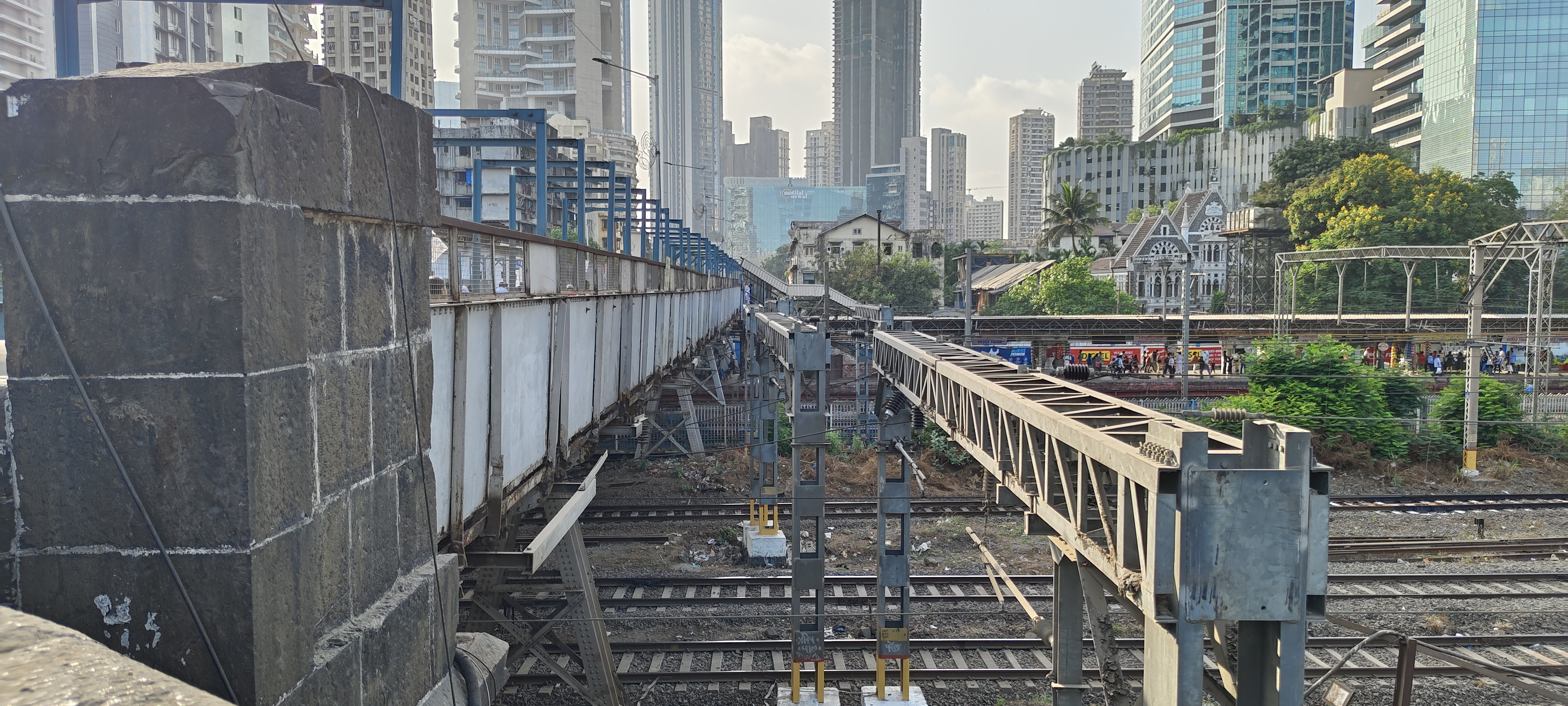
View of Prabhadevi stn. from Elphinstone Rd. Bridge east side

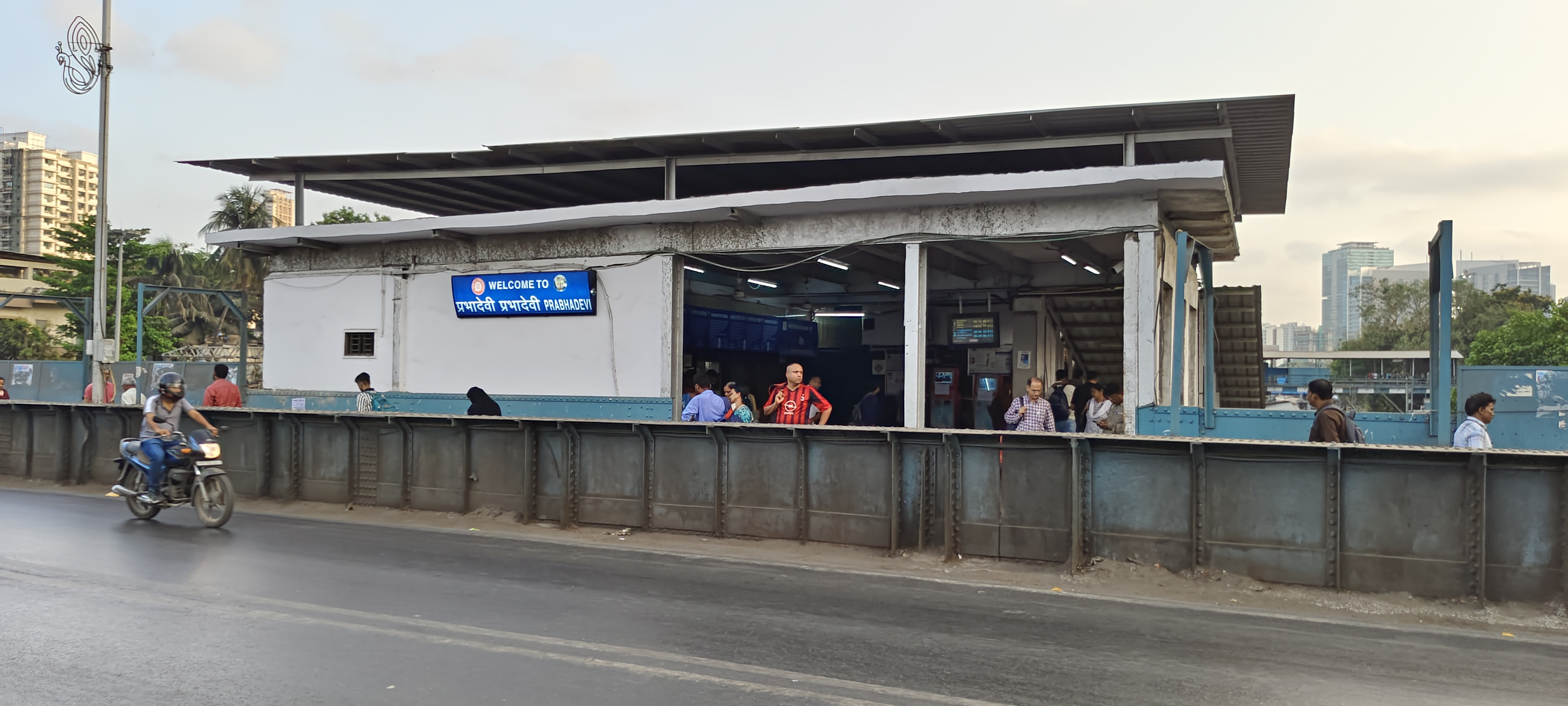
View of the elevated booking office adjacent to the Elphinstone Rd. Bridge

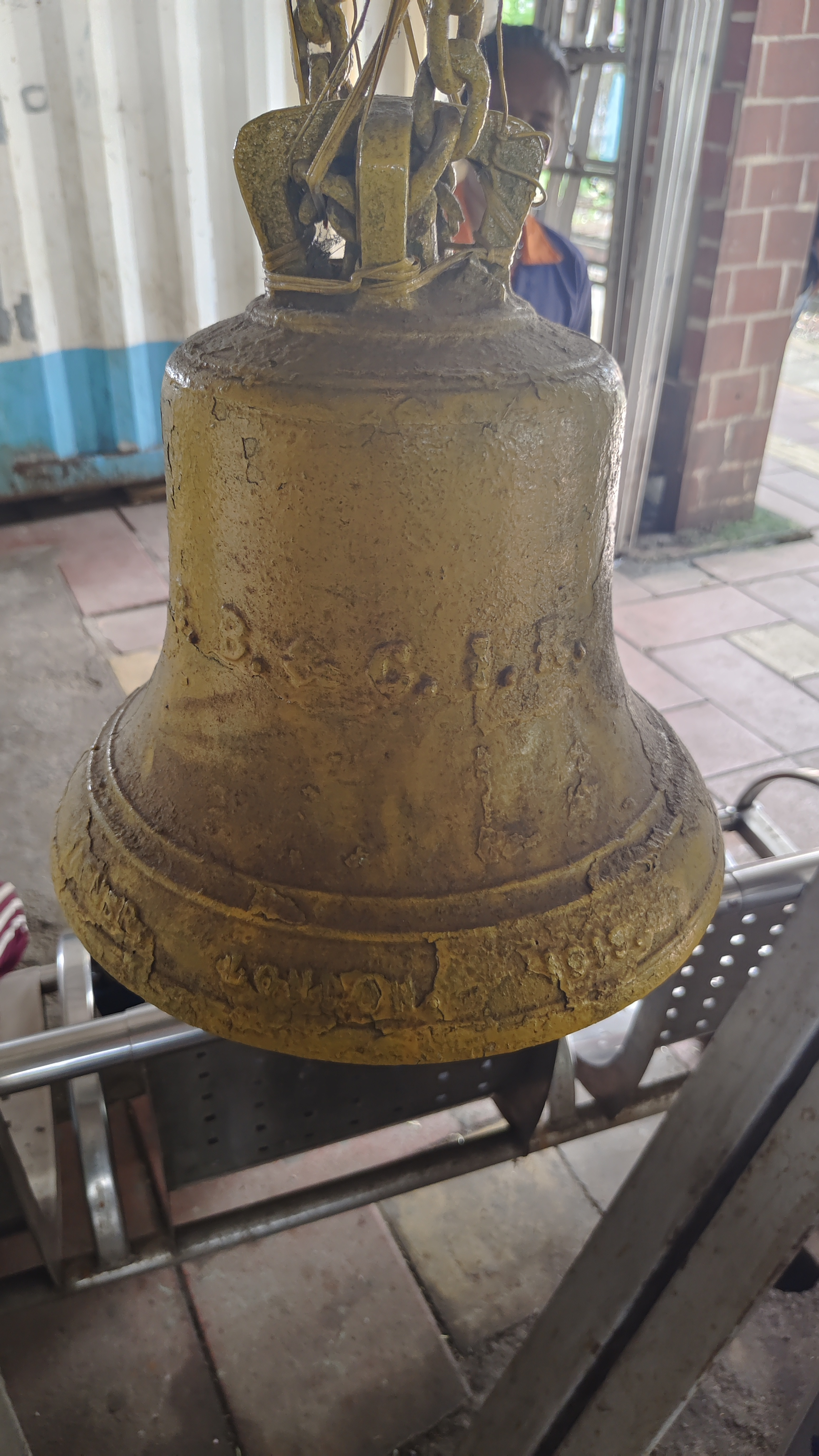
1913 BB&CI Railway Bell at the station. This used to hang in a signal cabin at the north of the station, but was shifted when the cabin was demolished for platform extension

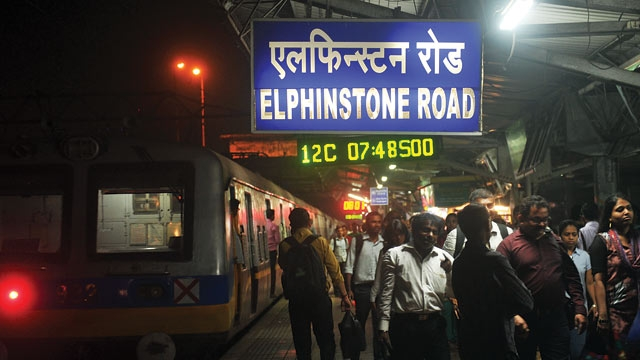
A Churchgate-bound train on Elphinstone Road Station

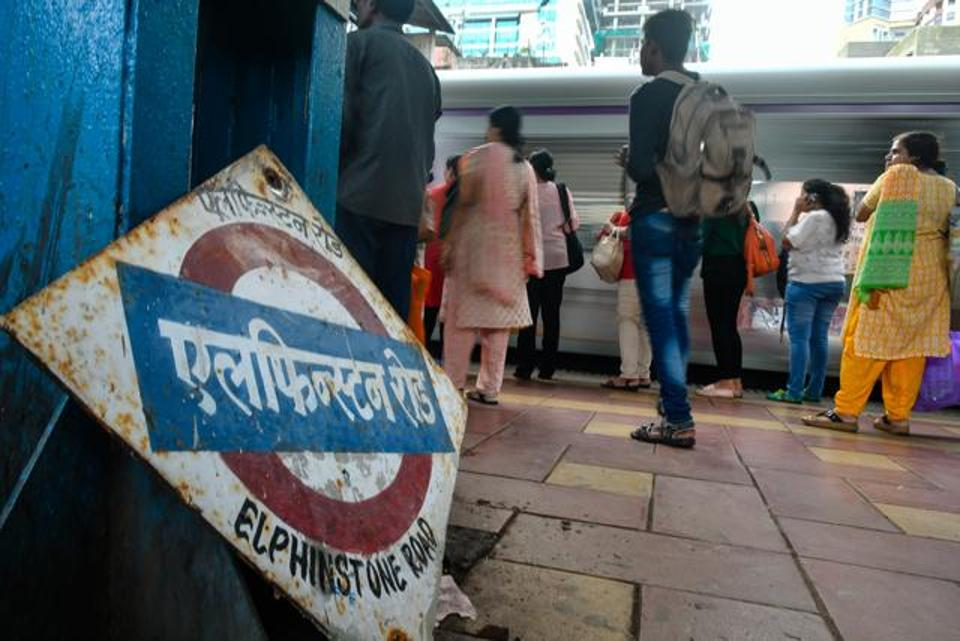
An abandoned Elphinstone Road Station board after the station was renamed to Prabhadevi
