= Lyvro de Plataforma das Fortalezas da India =

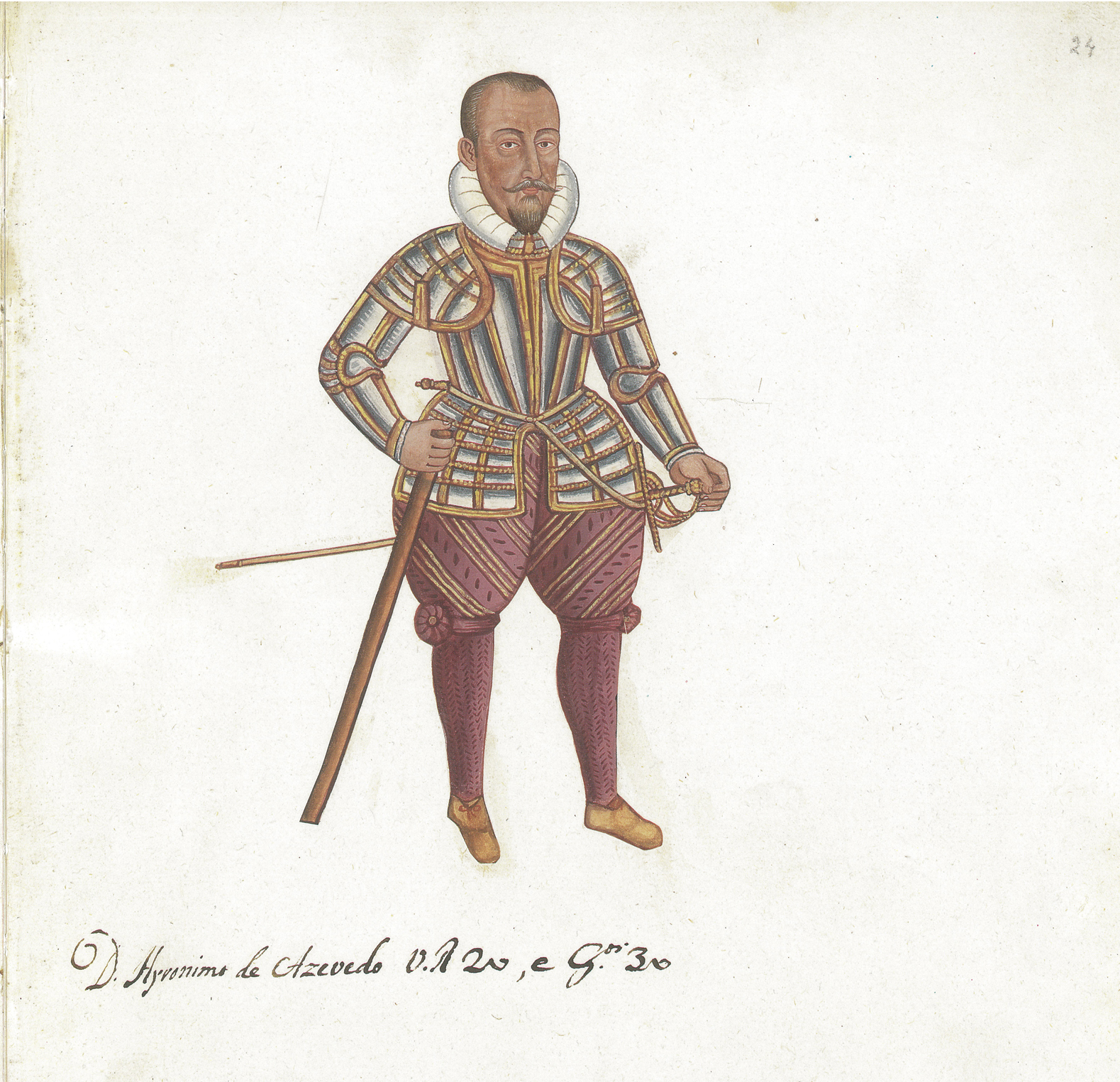
Portrait of Dom Jerónimo de Azevedo, Governor of Portuguese India, from Lyvro de Plataforma das Fortalezas da India.

The Lyvro de Plataforma das Fortalezas da India (Book of the Platform of the Fortresses of India), or the Livro da Plataforma das Fortalezas da Índia in modern Portuguese orthography, is a seventeenth-century carthographic book made by Malay-Portuguese author Manuel Godinho de Erédia.

The book is a illustrated account of the Portuguese Territories in East Africa, Middle East, India and East and Southeast Asia in 1620. Along with 25 portraits of the Viceroys and Governors of Portuguese India, the book contains 77 watercolor illustrations of maps and plans of the fortresses of the colonial Portuguese possessions and related places in the East.

== List of Plans ==
=== East Africa ===
- Sofala
- General view of Portuguese Mozambique
- Mozambique Island
- Mombasa
- Mombasa Fort

=== Middle East ===
- Qurayyat (Coriate) and Sidab (Cidabo)
- Muttrah (Matarâ)
- Muscat Fort
- Seeb (Sibó)
- Barka (Borca)
- Sohar (Soar)
- Kalba (Quelba) and Khor Fakkan (Corfacão)
- Madha (Mada) and Al Bidya (Libidias)
- Dibba Al-Fujairah (Dubo), Dibba Al-Hisn (Doba) and Dibba Al-Baya (Mocombi)
- Hormuz and environs
- Hormuz Fort
- Basra (Baçorá) and environs
- Bahrain Island (Barem)

=== India ===
- Diu Fort
- Surat and St. Jerome Fort
- Daman Fort
- Sanjan (Sangen) and Dahanu (Danu)
- Chinchani (Chinchana) and Tarapur (Trapor)
- Shirgaon (Sirgão) and Mahim (Maim)
- Agashi (Agacaim), Manora and Janjire-Arnala (Ilha das Vacas, Cows Island)
- Asheri (Serra de Aserim)
- Vasai Fort (Bacaim)
- Mumbai (Mombaim) and Karanja Island (Ilha de Caranja)
- Chaul Fort
- Bardez Region
- Agoada
- Bardez Fort
- Goa City
- Nossa Senhora do Cabo Fort
- São Dormingão Fort
- Salcete Island (Salsete)
- Honnavar Fort (Onor)
- Gangolli Fort (Cambolim)
- Basrur Fort (Barcalor)
- Mangaluru Fort (Mangalor)
- Kannur Fort (Cananor)
- Kottakkal Fort (Cunhale)
- Kollam Fort (Coulan)
- Nagapattinam (Negapatam)
- Santhome Fort
- Pulicat Fort (Daleacate)
- Goa Island

=== Sri Lanka ===
- Mannar Fort
- Sri Lanka Island (Seilam, Ceylon)
- Colombo Fort (Culumbo)
- Negombo (Negumbo)
- Kalutara (Caleture)
- Jaffna Fort (Jafanapatão)
- Galle Fort (Gale)
- Trincomalee (Triquilimale)
- Batticaloa (Batecalou)
- Tenavaram (Tanavare)
- Weligama (Beligão)
- Tavanapatam

=== Maldives ===
- Maldives Islands (Ilhas de Maldiva)

=== Southeast Asia ===
- Malacca
- Malacca Fort
- Malacca Island (Ilha das Naos, Carracks Island)
- Banda Aceh Fort (Fortaleza do Achém)
- Jakarta (Jacatará)
- Molucca Islands (Ilhas do Maluco)
- Banda Islands (Ilha de Bonda) and Ambon Island (Ilha de Aubino)
- Solor
- Ende (Eudevisuor)
- Luzon Island (Ilha de Manilha, Manila Island)

=== East Asia ===
- Macau
- Taiwan Island (Ilha Fermoza, Formosa)
