= Vikramaditya Statue =

2016 statue in Ujjain, Madhya Pradesh

Coordinates: 23°10′57″N 75°45′56″E

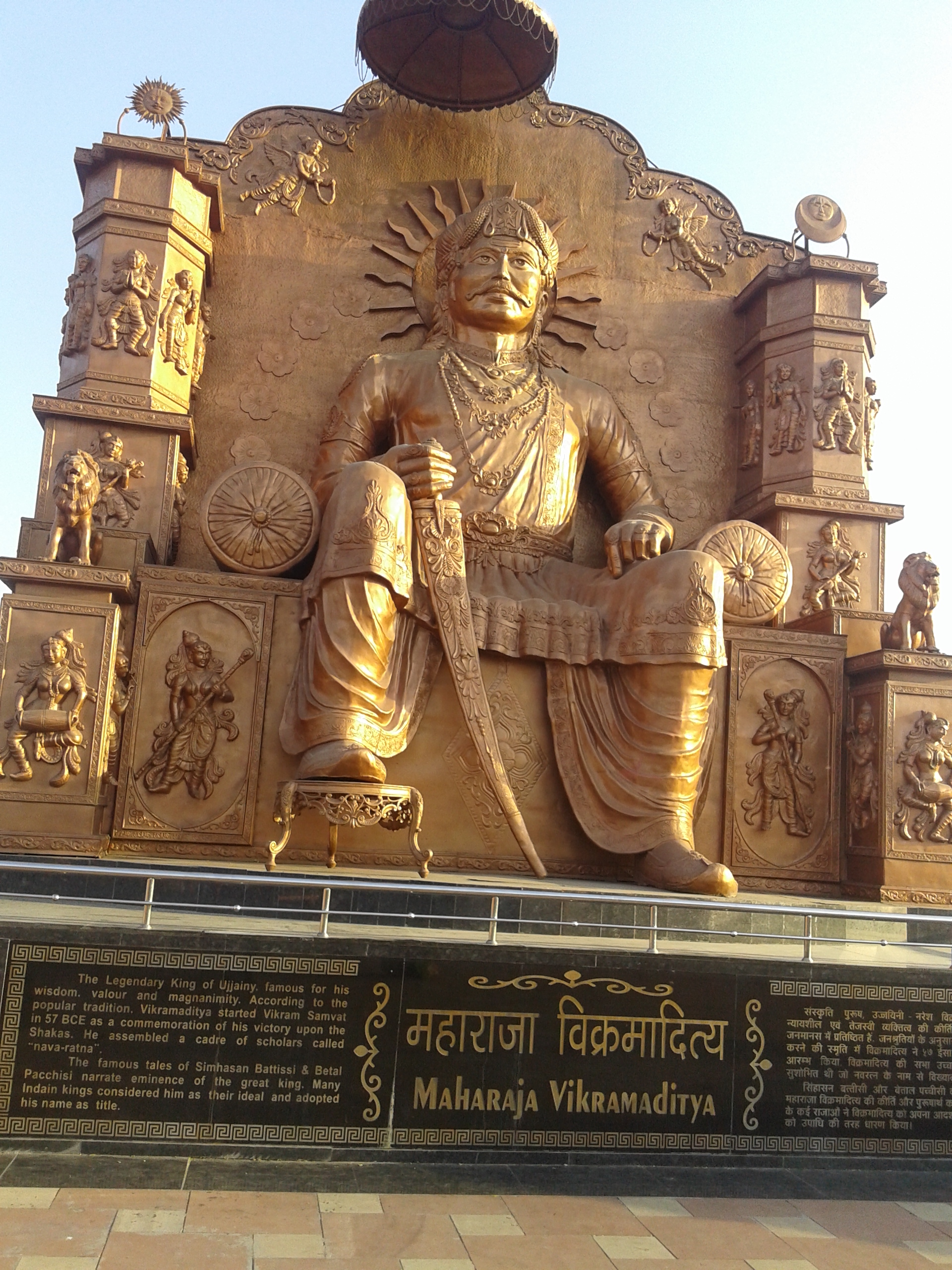
- Interactive map of Vikramaditya Statue
- Location: Vikram Teela, Ujjain, Madhya Pradesh
- Designer: Mahendra Kodwani
- Material: Brass
- Height: 9.1 m (30 ft)
- Beginning date: July 2015
- Completion date: 2016
- Dedicated to: Vikramaditya

The Vikramaditya Statue is a 9.1-metre (30-foot) statue of King Vikramaditya at Vikram Teela behind Mahakal Temple in Ujjain, Madhya Pradesh, India. The Statue is made of brass with a cost of ₹1 crore (US$120,000) by Ujjain Municipal Corporation and 'Simhastha Preparation Committee'. The statue was sculpted by Indore-based sculptor Mahendra Kodwani.

== See also ==
- Statue of Equality (disambiguation)
- Statue of Unity
