= Chinchpokli railway station =

Railway Station in Maharashtra, India

Chinchpokli
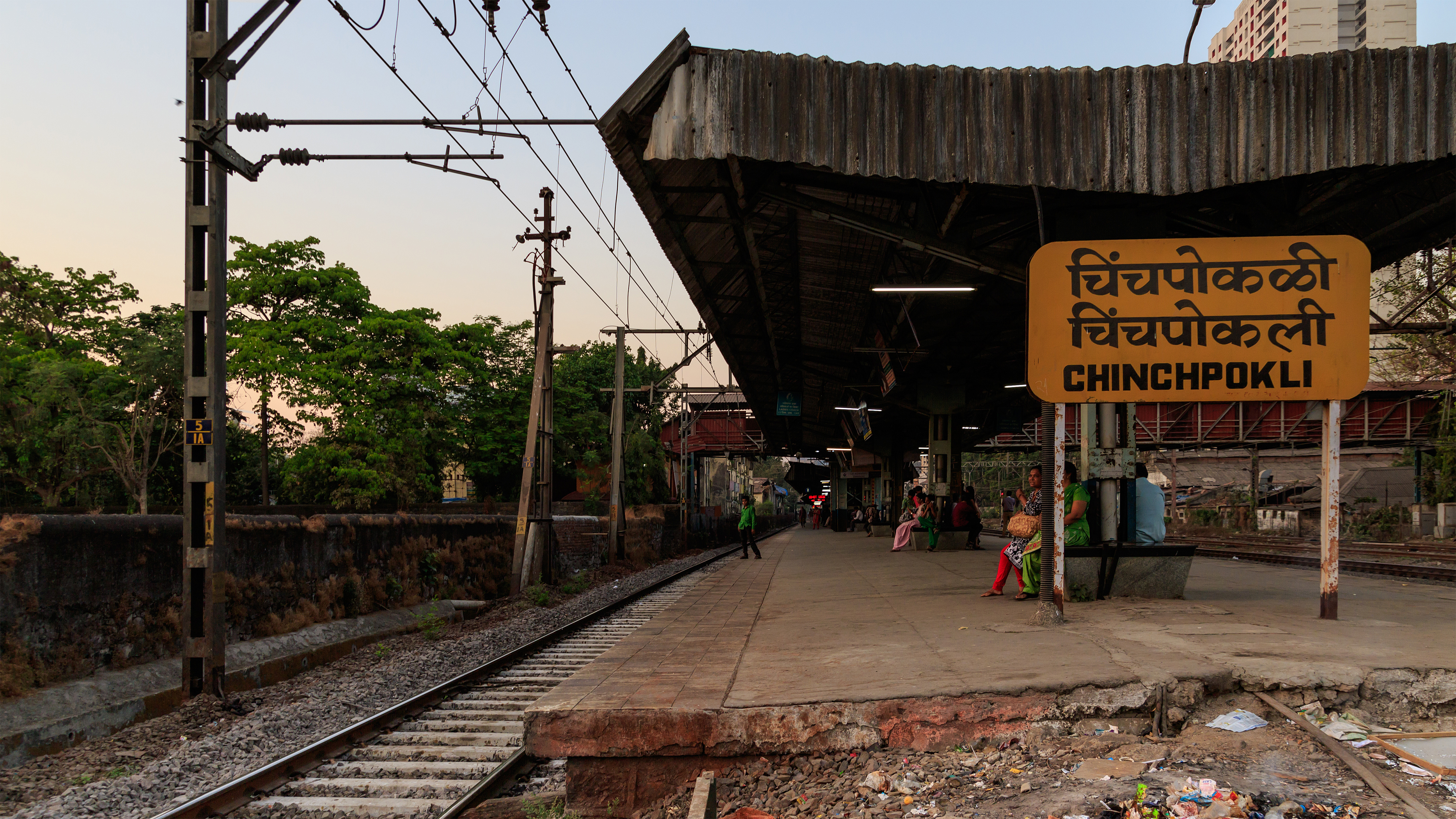

General information
- Coordinates: 18°59′15″N 72°49′58″E
- Elevation: 4.80 metres (15.7 ft)
- System: Indian Railways and Mumbai Suburban Railway station
- Owner: Ministry of Railways, Indian Railways
- Line: Central Line

Construction
- Structure type: Standard on-ground station

Other information
- Status: Active
- Station code: CHG
- Fare zone: Central Railways

History
- Opened: 9 December 1867

Services
Preceding station	Mumbai Suburban Railway	Following station
Byculla towards Chhatrapati Shivaji Terminus	Central line	Currey Road towards Kasara or Khopoli
Route map
Location
- Location within India Location within Maharashtra Location within Mumbai

Chinchpokli (formerly Chinchpugli, station code: CHG) is a railway station on the Central Line of the Mumbai Suburban Railway. The station was opened on 9 December 1867.

== History ==
Chinchpokli railway station was opened on 9 December 1867, along with Parel railway station. Work on a new station began in February 1893, and was completed in 1895, along with similar works for Currey Road.

In 1896, during the Bombay plague epidemic, the station was converted into medical transit place. Actual cases detected among passengers at Kalyan railway station, along with all cases and suspects from Sion station were sent to Chinchpokli station by trains. Here, they were met by Ambulances and conveyed to Arthur Rd Hospital (presently, Kasturba Hospital). Telegraphs were dispatched by the Station Master at Kalyan to that of Chinchpokli station, and this was conveyed to an ambulance coolie, who was constantly on duty. The telegraph would report the number of cases sent, and the trains transporting them, and this information would be used by the coolie to provide the necessary ambulance for their removal to the said hospital. The compartments inside which the patients were sent, were labelled as "To be disinfected."

== Gallery ==
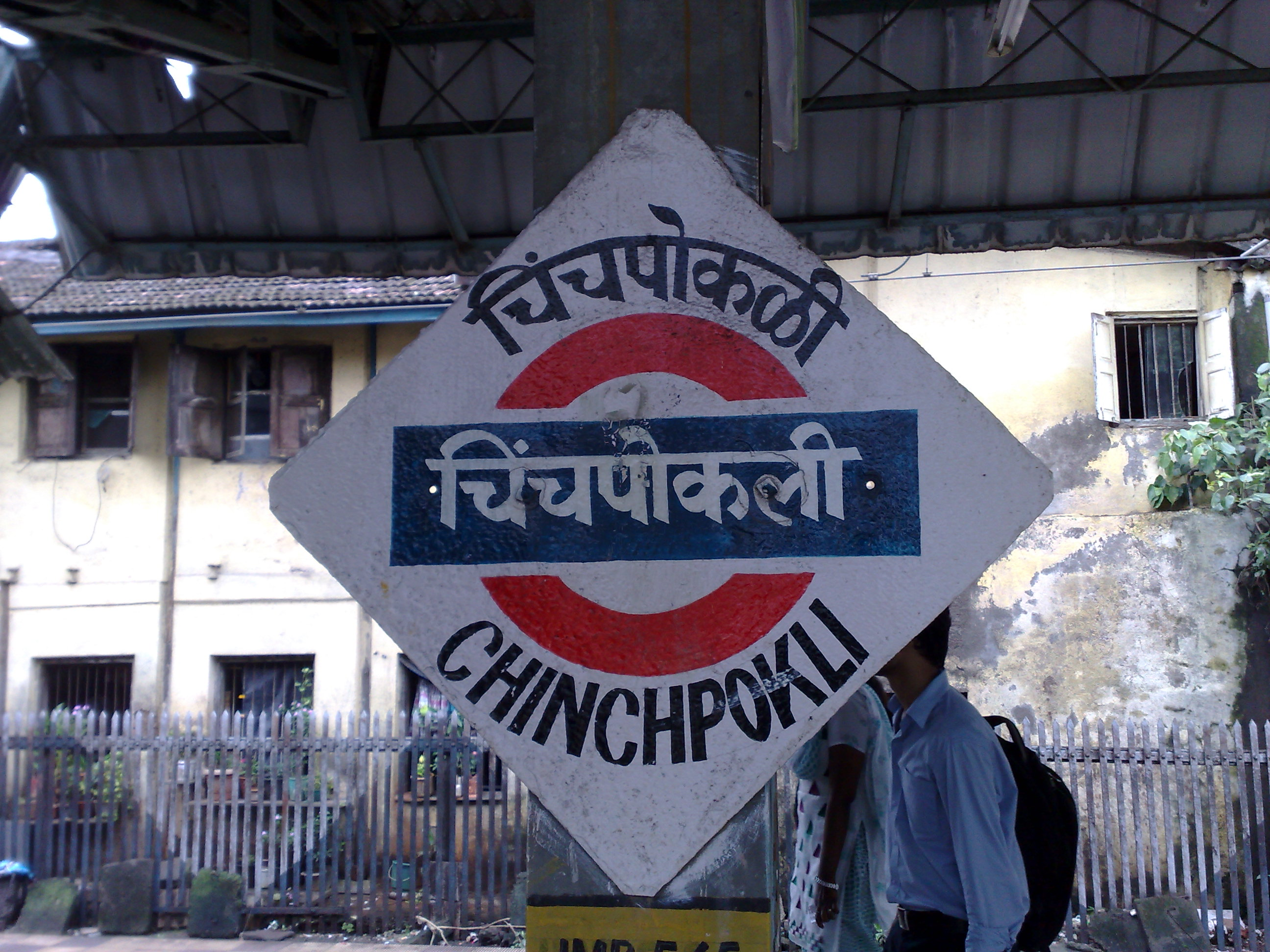
Chinchpokli Platform board

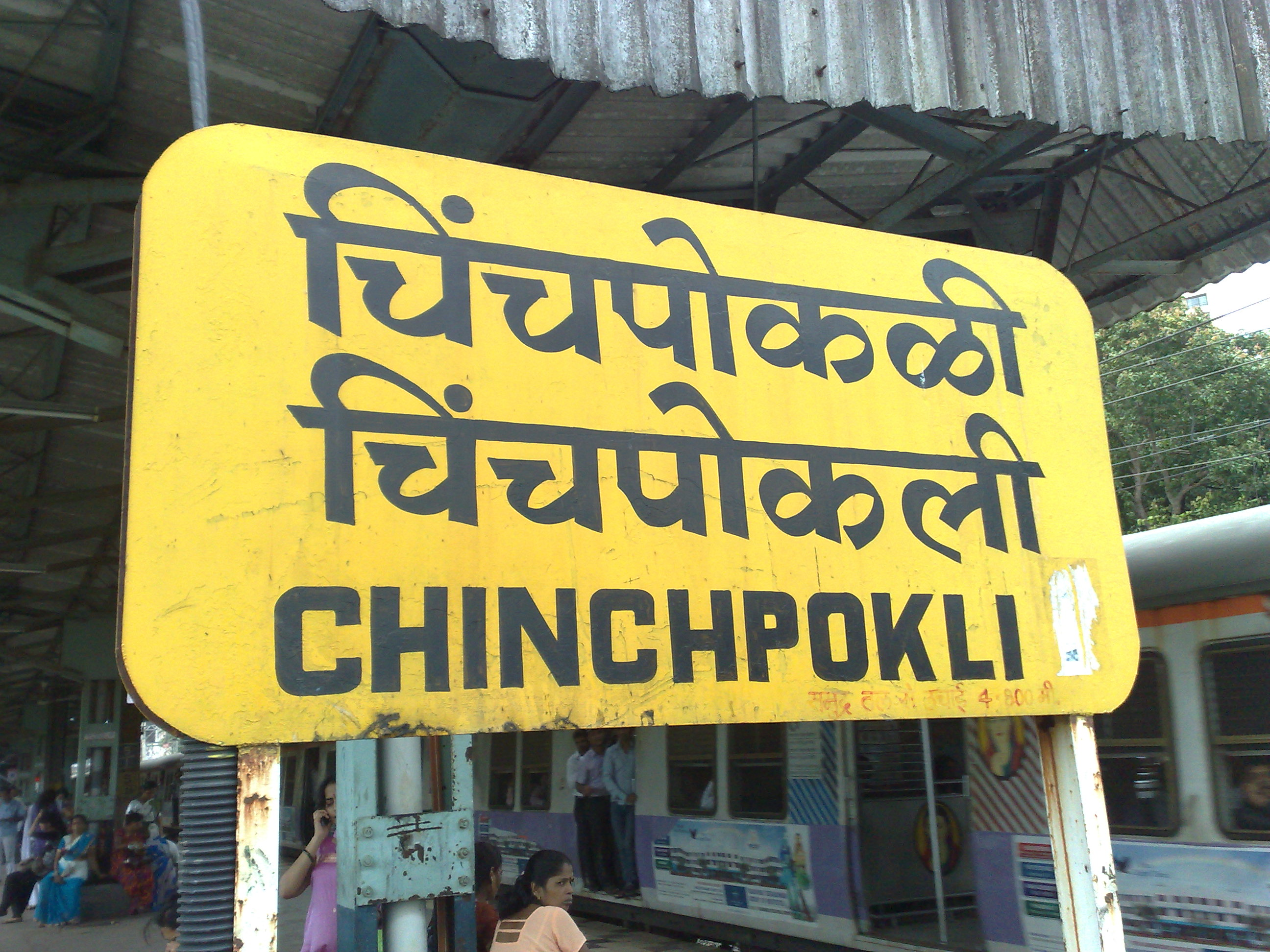
Chinchpokli Station boards

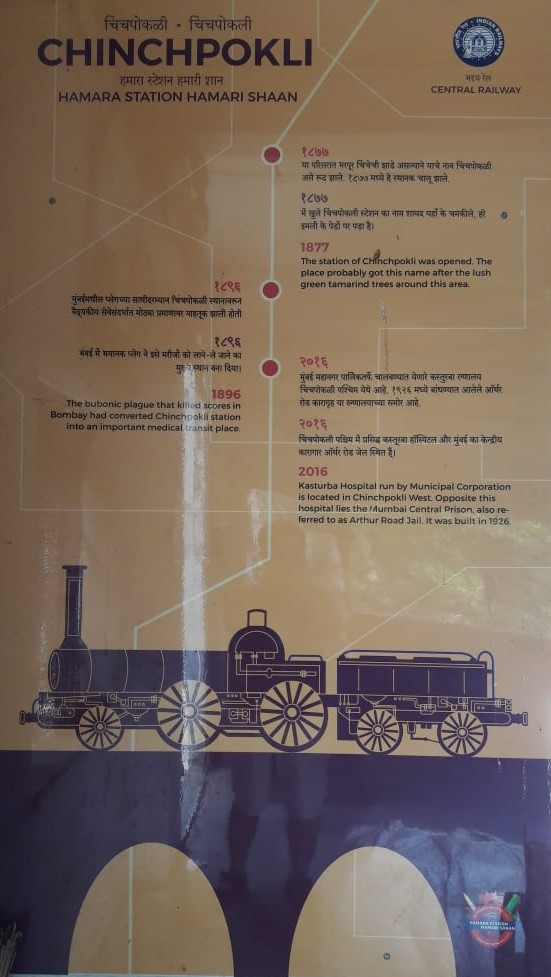
Chinchpokli station Banner
