= Bhima of Mahikavati =

13th-century king who ruled the present-day Mumbai area

Bhima was a 13th-century king who ruled the present-day Mumbai area in Maharashtra, India. He is known from several medieval Marathi and Persian language texts, which variously call him Raja Bimba, Bimb-dev (Bhima-deva), Bimba-dev, Bimba-shah, and Bimba-shaha. Based on these accounts, historians identify him as a son of king Ramadeva of Devagiri. After Alauddin Khalji's conquest of Devagiri, Bhima apparently fled to the northern Konkan region, and established a smaller kingdom with its capital at Mahikavati, the present-day Mahim.

== Marathi-language accounts ==
According to the Marathi-language text Mahikavatichi Bakhar (c. 1448 CE), the city and the kingdom of Mahikavati were established in the 12th century by Pratap Bimb, a brother of the king of Champaner. After a successor of Pratap Bimb died heirless, Nagar-shah of Ghandivi (Gandevi) captured Mahikavati. The Yadava king Ramdev-rao tried to capture Mahikavati, with support of Nagar-shah's rebel relatives, but the attack was repulsed. Subsequently, the Delhi Sultan Ala-ud-din defeated and killed Ramdev-rao. Ramdev-rao's son Keshavdev regained control of the Yadava capital Devagiri, and his other son Bimb-dev - the governor of Udgir - launched a military campaign against Ala-ud-din. During this campaign, Bimb-dev reached northern Konkan, where he defeated several small chiefs, and forced Nagar-shah to flee. With support of the local elites, Bimb-dev ruled his newly-conquered territory from Mahikavati. Later, Nagar-shah's forces, led by his son Tripurkumur, defeated the army of Bimb-dev's son Pratap-shah and regained control of the area. Soon after, Ala-ud-din Khalji ended the Yadava rule at Devagiri, thus leaving Nagar-shah firmly in control of the present-day Mumbai area.

Another Marathi-language account of Bhima is found in Biṁbākhyāna or Bimbakhyan ("The story of Bimba"), a poetic version of Mahikavatichi Bakhar, present in the archives of the Bharat Itihas Sanshodhak Mandal, Pune. This manuscript was authored by Lakṣumaṇa (Laxman) Prabhu. It states that the king Bimba-dev came to Konkan travelling through Anahilavada in 1294 CE (1216 Shaka). He was accompanied by a number of people, who had left the kingdoms of Anahilavada and Devagiri because of Muslim invasions. Bimba halted at Mahim, then an island, and became enamoured with its beautiful scenery. He built a palace on the island, and his followers also built their residences there.

Another manuscript from the Bharat Itihas Sanshodhak Mandal archives, copied by Naranji in 1798 CE, also mentions king Bimba. The first chapter of this manuscript, titled Shree Ram Mahima and dated 1388 CE, states that Ram Raja - the father of Raja Bimba - came to Konkan around 1144 CE from the "five Paithans", namely Champaner, Hastinapur, Nagabaj, Mangi Paithan, and Panhala. The second chapter (dated 1614 CE) and the fifth chapter (undated) mention Bimba.

== Persian-language accounts ==
A 1436 CE Persian-language record, bearing the seal of Bahmani king Ala-ud-din's dewan Mahmud Dalil, mentions Bimba. It states that in 1290 CE (Shalivahan era 1212), Raja Bimba-shah took possession of north Konkan from Karson. "Karson" can be identified with Krishna, a Brahmin known to have served the viceroy of Ramadeva (Ramachandra) in northern Konkan in 1290 CE.

A 1495 CE Persian-language firman issued by Chand Khan, the Nawab of the Daman subha (province) mentions that Bimba-shaha fled Devagiri, after Alauddin defeated his father Ram Dev. Bimba came to Mahim with 12 prominent people, including his royal perceptor (raj-guru) Purushottam-pant Kawale and 11 nobles (umraos). He took control of the coastal towns, such as Parnera, Sanjan, Shirgaon and others. He himself settled in Mahi (Mahim), and divided the rest of the region into 12 parts, granting Malad to Purushottam-pant Kawale. A 1299 CE donation record (danapatra) also states that king 'Bimba-deva' granted some land in present-day Mumbai to Purushottam Kavle (Kawale).

== Identification ==
Historians generally identify Bhima of Mahikavati as a son of the Yadava (Seuna) king Ramachandra of Devagiri. The various accounts suggests he fled to Konkan after his father's defeat against Alauddin, took possession of north Konkan from his father's viceroy Krishna, and established himself as the king there. According to one account, he built a temple dedicated to his family goddess Prabha-devi, which was destroyed during a Muslim invasion; the deity's idol was hidden in a well, and later placed at the Prabhadevi Temple built in 1714 by members of the Prabhu community.

In the past, some historians misidentified Bhima as a Chaulukya (Solanki) king of Gujarat, based on the Bimbakhyan account which states that he came to Konkan from Anahilavada, which was the capital of the Chaulukya dynasty. For example, Goan physician-indologist José Gerson da Cunha identified him as Bhima I (r. 1022–1064), and speculated that Bhima fled to present-day Mumbai after losing his capital during the Ghaznavid invasion of 1026. However, this identification is incorrect as Bhima I is known to have regained control of this capital after the Ghaznavid raid, and ruled until 1064. Vithal Sadanand Vyavaharkar, in his History of the Pathare Prabhus (1919), identified Bhima of Mahikavati as Bhima II (r. 1178–1240). This identification is also implausible, as Bhima II was a weak king, who was not in a position to defeat the contemporary Shilahara kings of northern Konkan, such as Aparaditya I and Keshideva II. The chronicles of Gujarat, such as Hemachandra's Dvyasśaya and Merutunga's Prabandha-Chintamani, which record the achievements of Chaulukya monarchs in detail, make no mention of their conquests or rule in the Mahim area. Kumarapala was the only Chaulukya king who invaded Konkan. But he did not rule the area. Northern Konkan was ruled by the Shilahara kings around 1260 CE, and after that by the Yadavas of Devagiri.
