= Siddhivinayak Temple, Mumbai =

Hindu temple dedicated to Ganesha in Mumbai

Shri Siddhivinayak Temple
- श्री सिद्धिविनायक मंदिर
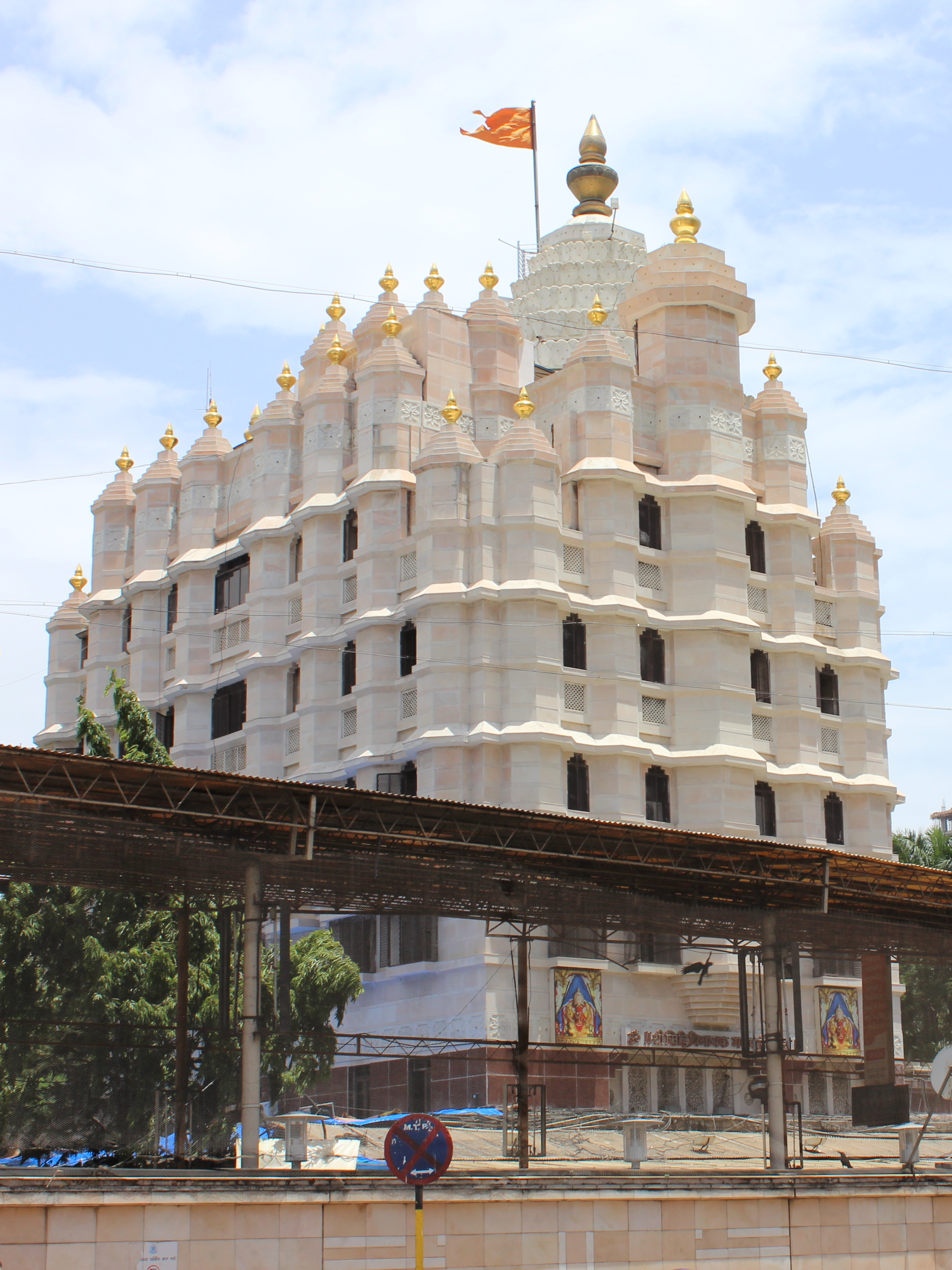
- Shri Siddhivinayak Temple, Mumbai (Maharashtra, India)

- Location in Maharashtra

Religion
- Affiliation: Hinduism
- District: Mumbai
- Deity: Ganesha
- Festival: Ganesh Chaturthi
- Governing body: Shree Siddhivinayak Ganapati Temple Trust

Location
- Location: Prabhadevi, Dadar
- State: Maharashtra
- Country: India
- Coordinates: 19.016920°N 72.830409°E

Architecture
- Type: Mandir
- Creator: Laxman Vithu & Deubai Patil
- Completed: 19 November 1801; 224 years ago

Website
- http://siddhivinayak.org

The Shri Siddhivinayak Ganapati Mandir is a Hindu temple dedicated to Ganesha. It is located in Prabhadevi neighbourhood of Mumbai, Maharashtra. It was originally built by Laxman Vithu and Deubai Patil on 19 November 1801. It is one of the most popular Hindu temples in Mumbai.

The temple has a small mandap with the shrine for Siddhi Vinayak ("Ganesha who grants your wish"). The wooden doors to the sanctum are carved with images of the Ashtavinayaka (the eight manifestations of Ganesha in Maharashtra). The inner roof of the sanctum is plated with gold, and the central statue is of Ganesha. In the periphery, there is a Hanuman temple as well. The exterior of the temple consists of a dome which is lit up with multiple colors in the evenings and they keep changing every few hours. The statue of Shri Ganesha is located exactly under the dome. The pillars are carved out with the images of the Ashtavinayaka.

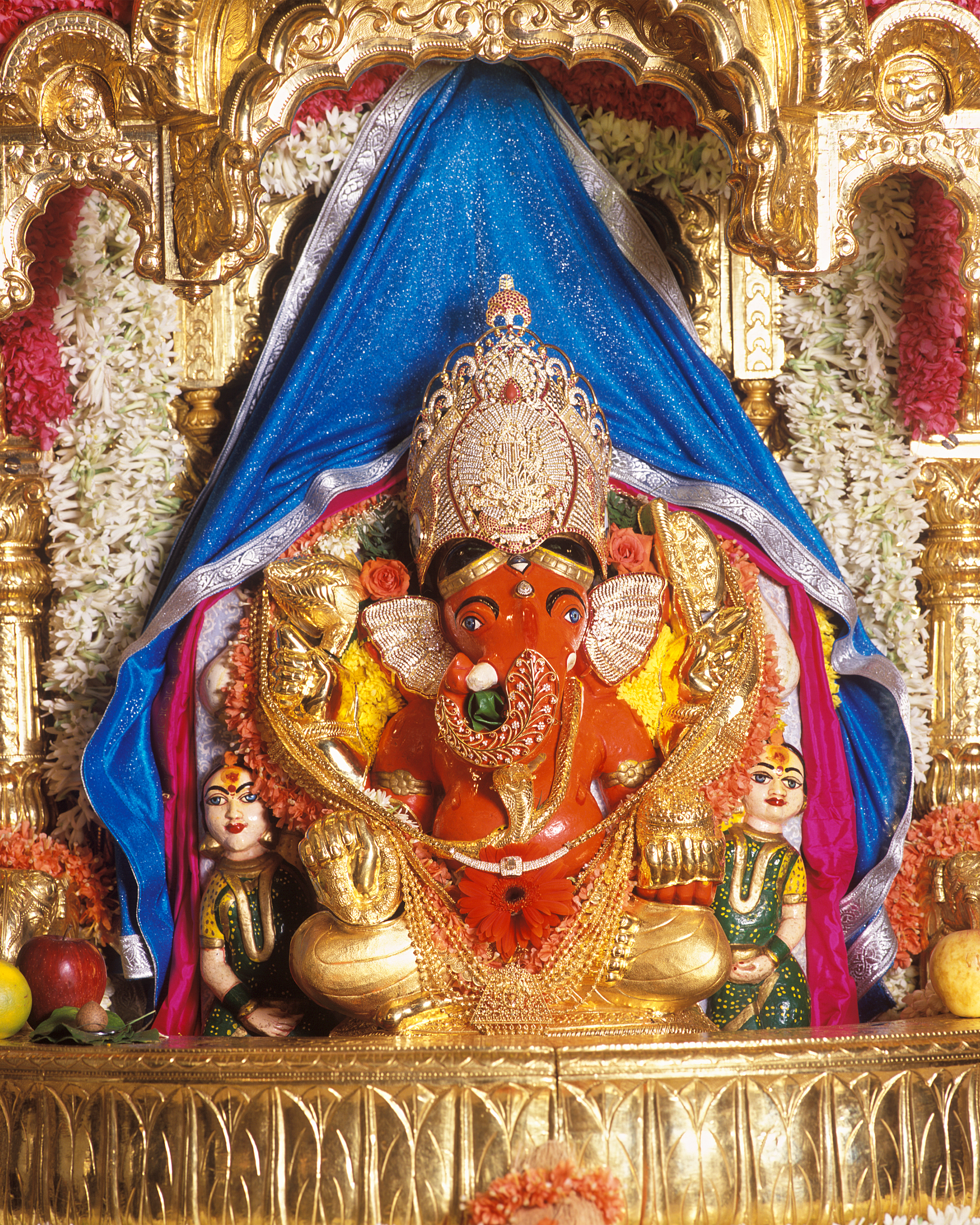
The Ganesh Idol.

== Governance ==
Temple donations and other activities related to temple are governed by the board members of the Shri Siddhi Vinayak Ganpati Temple Trust. The trust is registered under Bombay Public Trusts Act, 1950, with the name “Shri Ganpati Temple at Prabhadevi Road, Dadar, Mumbai".

The Trust is regulated by the Shri SiddhiVinayak Ganpati Temple Trust (Prabhadevi) Act, 1980. It was adopted on 11 October 1980.

Sada Sarvankar is the current chairman of the trust.

=== Donations and litigation ===
The Siddhivinayak temple receives donations of around ₹100 million (US$1.0 million) – ₹150 million (US$1.6 million) every year, which makes it the Mumbai city's richest temple trust. In 2004, the Siddhivinayak Ganpati Temple Trust, which operates the temple, was accused of mismanaging donations. Consequently, the Bombay High Court appointed a committee headed by the retired judge V P Tipnis to scrutinize the trust's donations and probe the allegations. The committee reported that "The most shocking aspect of the matter is that there is no method or principle followed for particular institutions. The only criteria for selection were recommendation or reference by trustees, or the minister, or a political heavy-weight, generally belonging to the ruling party".

In 2006, the Bombay High Court directed the state government, the Siddhivinayak Temple Trust and the petitioner Keval Semlani to prepare "suggestive guidelines" for using the temple's trust funds.

== See also ==
- Siddhivinayak Temple, Siddhatek
