= Manuel Godinho de Erédia =

Malay-Portuguese writer and cartographer

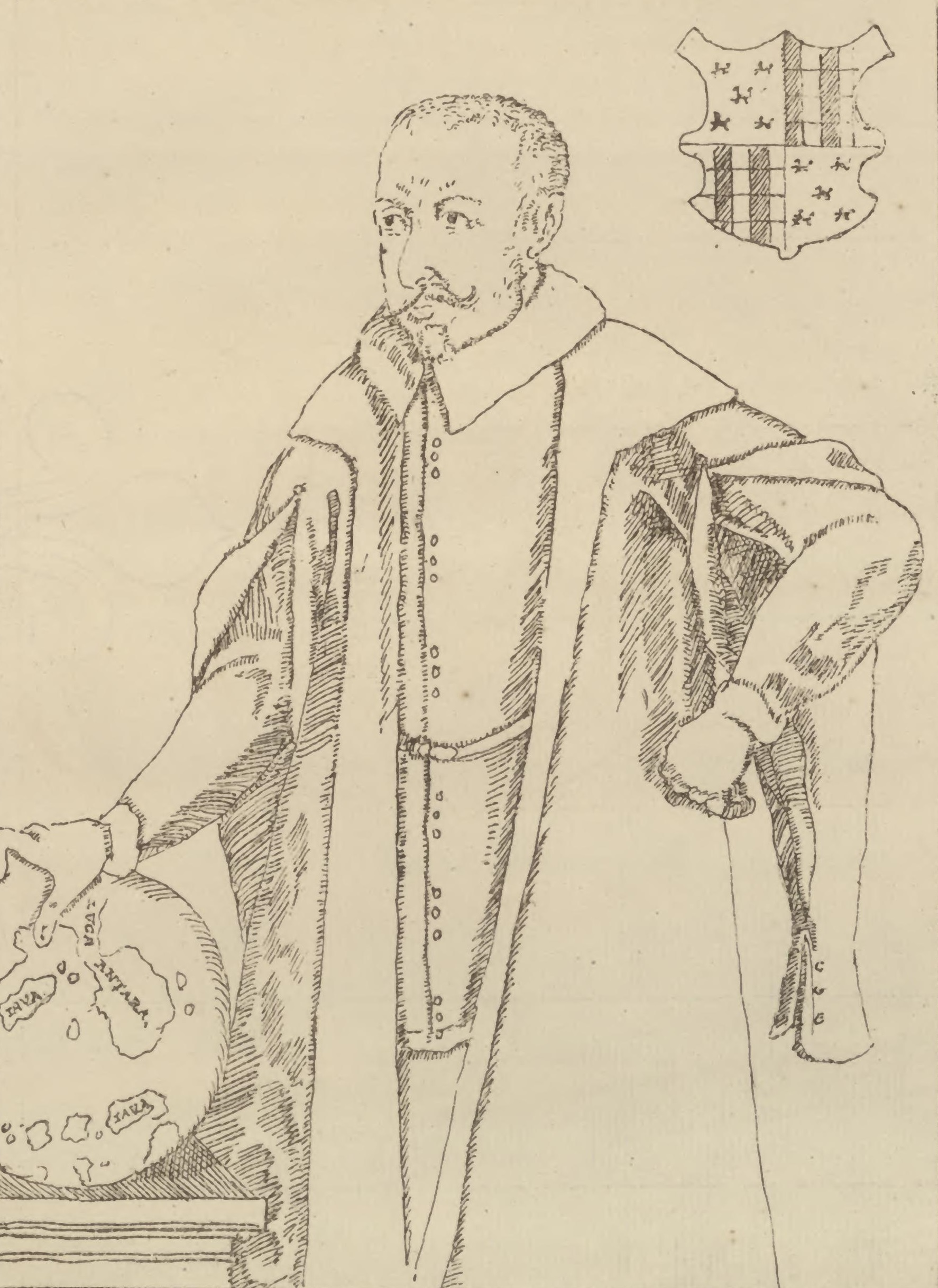
- Self-portrait in Declaraçam de Malaca e India Meridional com o Cathay, 1613
- Born: 16 July 1563; Portuguese Malacca
- Died: 1623 (aged 59–60)
- Occupations: Author; cartographer
- Spouse: Vilante de Sampaio (m. 1586)
- Parents: João de Erédia Aquaviva; Dona Elena Vessiva

Manuel Godinho de Erédia, or Emanuel Godinho de Erédia (16 July 1563 – 1623), was a Bugis-Portuguese writer and cartographer. He wrote a number of books, including an early account of the Malay Peninsula that is a source of information on the region of that period. In the early 17th century, he became interested in exploring a "southern land", which is thought to be Australia.

== Life ==
Godinho de Erédia was the youngest of four children of João de Erédia Aquaviva, a Portuguese of Aragonese and Italian descent. His mother was Dona Elena Vessiva from Sulawesi, a Bugis princess, the daughter of La Putebulu the recently baptized King of Suppa. His father was part of a Portuguese missionary expedition to Sulawesi when he met the 15-year-old girl, who fell in love and eloped with the Portuguese captain, and they married in 1545. Manuel Godinho de Erédia was born on 16 July 1563 in Malacca where he also spent his childhood. He was educated at a Jesuit school there.

His mother died in 1575, and soon after when he was 13, Erédia was sent to a Jesuit college in Goa where he was trained in astronomy, cartography and mathematics. He was received into Company of Jesus in 1579, but left to work for the Portuguese government in Goa in 1580 as his Superiors felt it would better suit his interest in exploration.

Erédia married Vilante de Sampaio in Cochin in around 1586. They had two children: a daughter born in 1587 and a son in 1588.

== Career ==
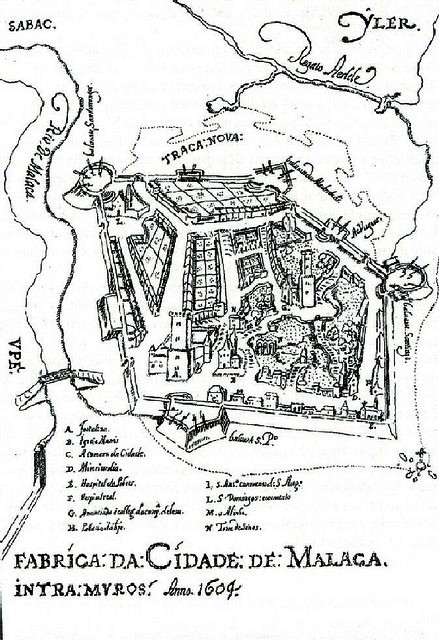
"Construction of Malacca City: Intramuros Anno 1604" by Godinho de Eredia.

Erédia worked as a cosmographer, wrote books, and taught mathematics. He also served as a soldier and military engineer. He prepared new maps of Asian countries for the King of Spain. The King was said to have named Eredia as the discoverer of Meridional India (a supposed southern land) on 14 February 1594, and he was also said to have given the title of Governor General (adelantado) and made a member of the Order of Christ. There is however no proof of these claims.

Erédia became interested in finding the legendary "land of gold", and returned to South East Asia in 1600 on a mission to explore further the Indonesian Archipelago. However, he had to stay in Malacca for four years, commanding a fleet of 70 ships guarding the southern approach to the Malacca. He founded a fort in Muar in 1604, and captured Kota Batu, the capital of Johore, with General Andre Furtado de Mendoça.

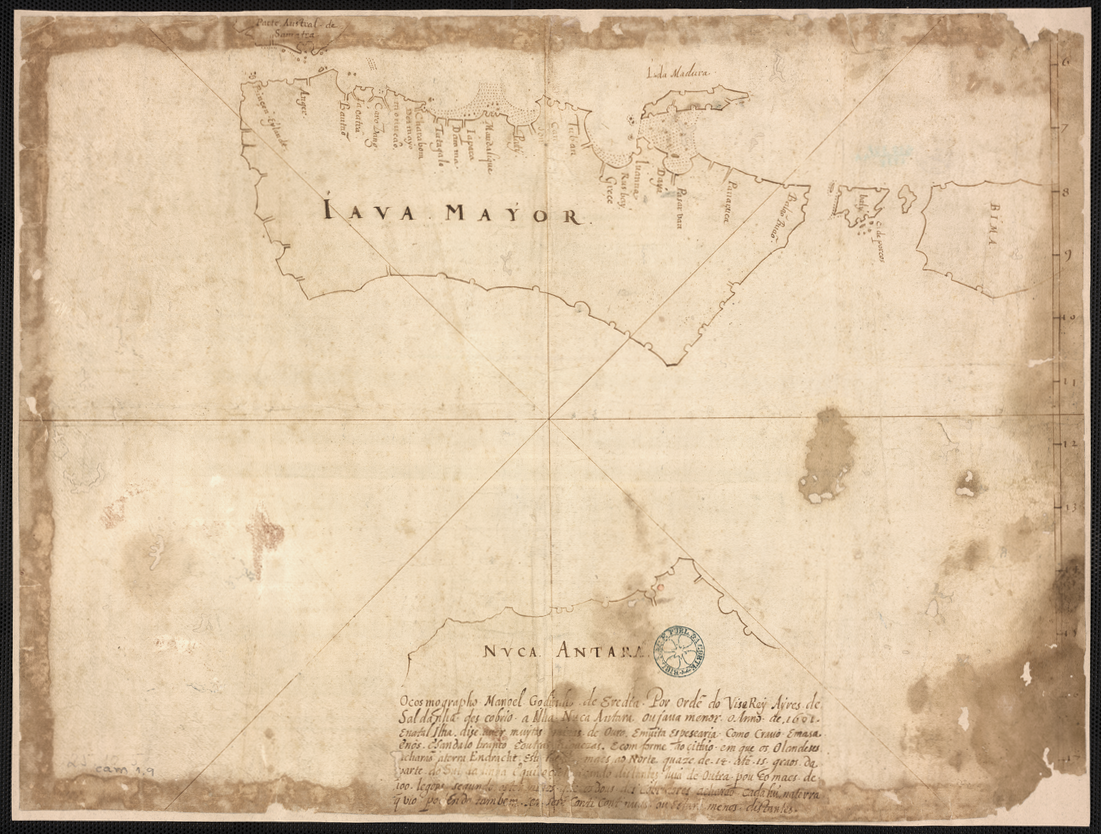
Map by Godinho de Erédia showing Java and possibly Australia (marked as Nuca Antara)

Teixeira Albernaz's 1630 "General Chart for All Navigation" (Taboas Geraes de Toda a Navegação), crediting Godinho de Erédia for the discovery of Australia

Erédia heard of a land to the south or Luca Antara—which may have been Australia—in 1601 and was interested in exploring it but fell ill in 1605 and had to return to Goa. He sent a servant to accompany Javanese seamen to Luca Antara in 1610, although unbeknownst to him the Dutch had already discovered the existence of the northern shore of Australia by 1606. Erédia described the exploration in his book Declaraçam de Malaca e da India Meridional com Cathay.

== Works ==
Apart from his maps, Erédia left a diverse range of written work and drawings. His most significant book is Description of Malaca, Meridional India, and Cathay written in 1613, and it is a source of information on the early history of Malacca. None of his books were published in his lifetime. Among his works are:

- 1597–1600 — Report on the Golden Chersonese, or Peninsula, and Auriferous, Carbuncular and Aromatic Islands (a broad account of the Malay Archipelago); Report on Meridional India
- 1610 — Plantas de plaças das conquistas de Portugal
- 1611 — Discourse on the Province of Indostan, termed Mogûl
- 1612 — Summary of the Trees and Plants of India intra Ganges (Suma de árvores e plantas da Índia Intra Ganges)
- 1613 — Description of Malaca, Meridional India, and Cathay (Declaraçam de Malaca e da India Meridional com Cathay)
- 1615 — History of the Martyrdom of Luiz Monteiro Coutinho
- 1616 — Treatise on Ophir (Tratado Ophirico). An autobiography is included in this work.
- c. 1620 — Lyvro de Plataforma das Fortalezas da India (an illustrated accounts of Portuguese territories in 1620 between East Asia and East Africa, including Macau, Bacaim, Colombo, Ormuz and Mozambique.)

== See also ==
- Theory of the Portuguese discovery of Australia
- Javanese contact with Australia
- Jave la Grande
