= Prabhadevi Temple =

Historic Hindu temple in Mumbai

- प्रभादेवी मंदिर
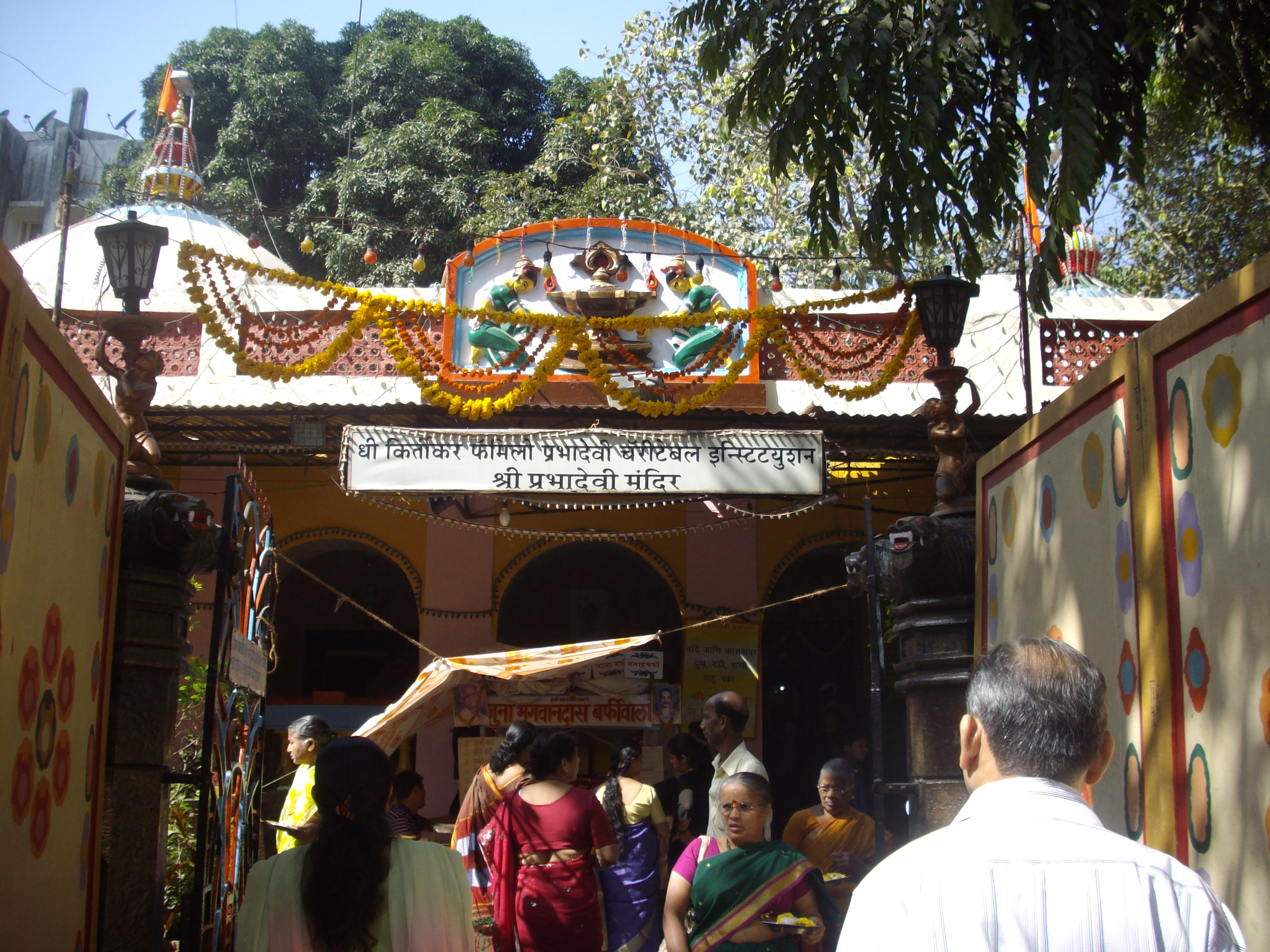

Religion
- Affiliation: Hinduism
- District: Mumbai
- Deity: Prabhadevi or Shakambari Devi

Location
- Location: Prabhadevi, Mumbai, India
- State: Maharashtra
- Country: India
- Interactive map of Prabhadevi Temple
- Coordinates: 19.014509°N 72.827535°E

Architecture
- Funded by: Pathare Prabhu community
- Established: 1715

Prabhadevi Temple, also known as Prabhavati Devi Temple, is a Hindu temple located in the Prabhadevi area, near Dadar, Mumbai. The idol representing the main deity, Prabhavati Devi, dates back to the 12th Century. The temple itself, though, was constructed in 1715, making it only 300 years old.

== History ==
According to historians, the main deity of Prabhadevi Temple was originally referred to as Shakambari Devi. She was the famous goddess (Kuladevi) of Seuna Yadava king Bimba Raja of Devgiri. According to local folklore, Prabhavati Devi appeared in the dreams of a devotee named Shyam Nayak from the Pathare Prabhu (one of Mumbai's earliest native communities), who would go on to build the temple of Prabhadevi.

The idol of the goddess was shifted to Karnataka, where it was attacked by Muslim invaders known as the Mughals. Later, it was moved back to Mahim Creek and placed in the current Prabhadevi temple.

== Other ==
- Prabhadevi is situated between the Dadar to the north, Worli to the south, and the Arabian Sea to the west. The place is named after the deity of the Prabhadevi Temple.
- Prabhadevi railway station, a station on the Western line of the Mumbai Suburban Railway is named after Prabhadevi. It was previously known as Elphinstone Road.

== Gallery ==
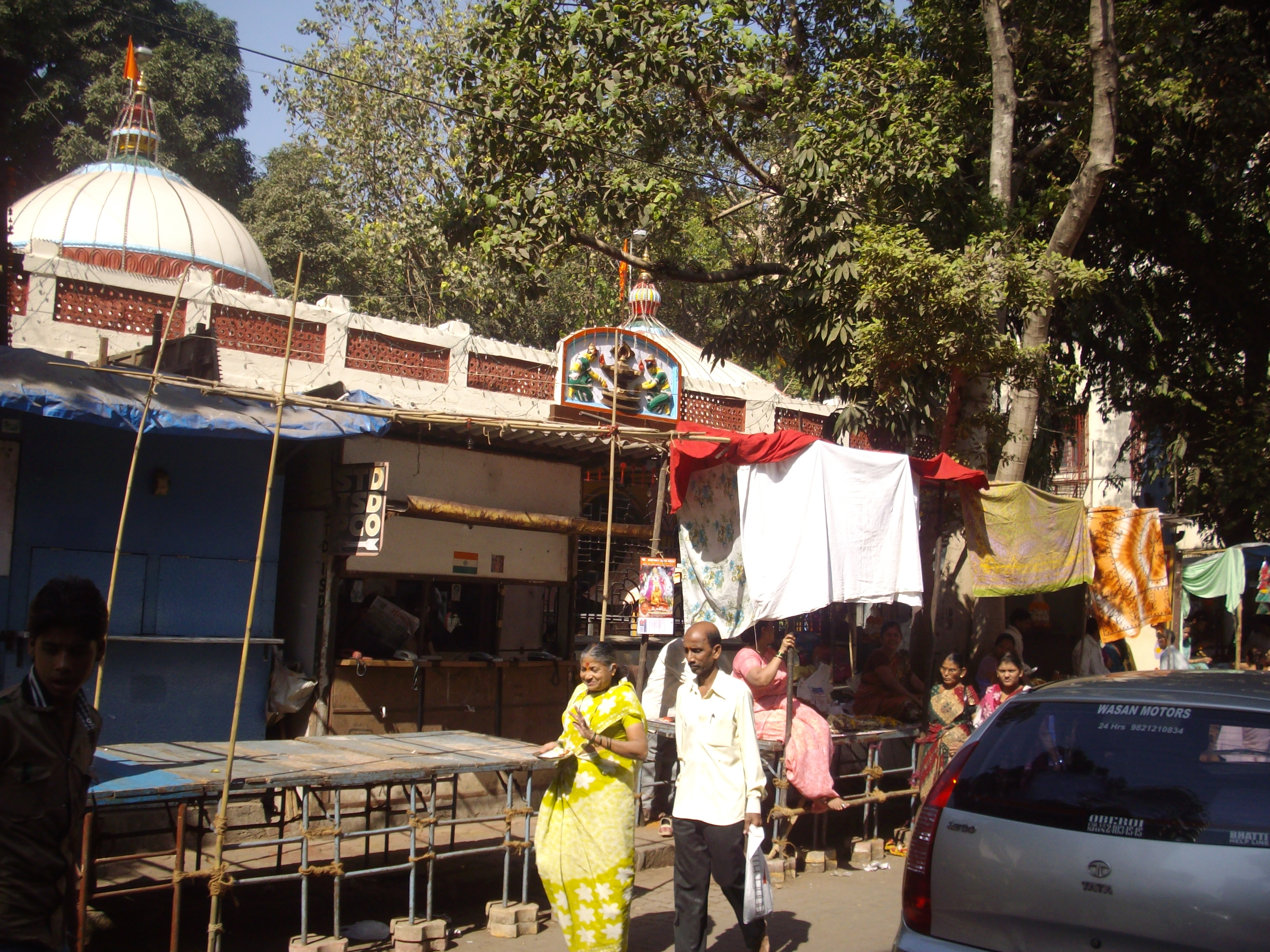
Prabhadevi Temple

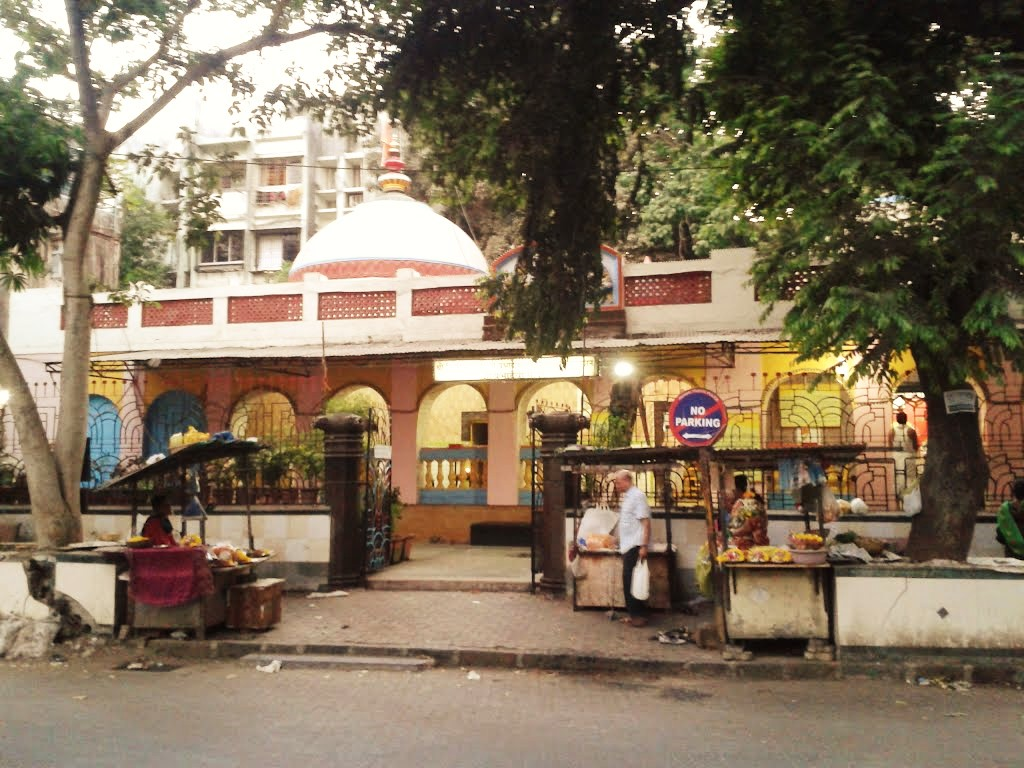
Prabhadevi Temple

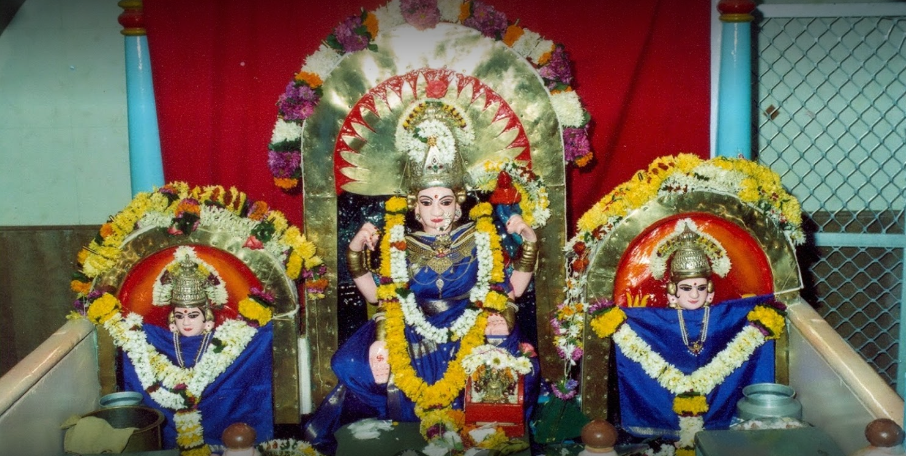
Deities in Prabhadevi Temple
