= Currey Road railway station =

Railway Station in Maharashtra, India

Currey Road
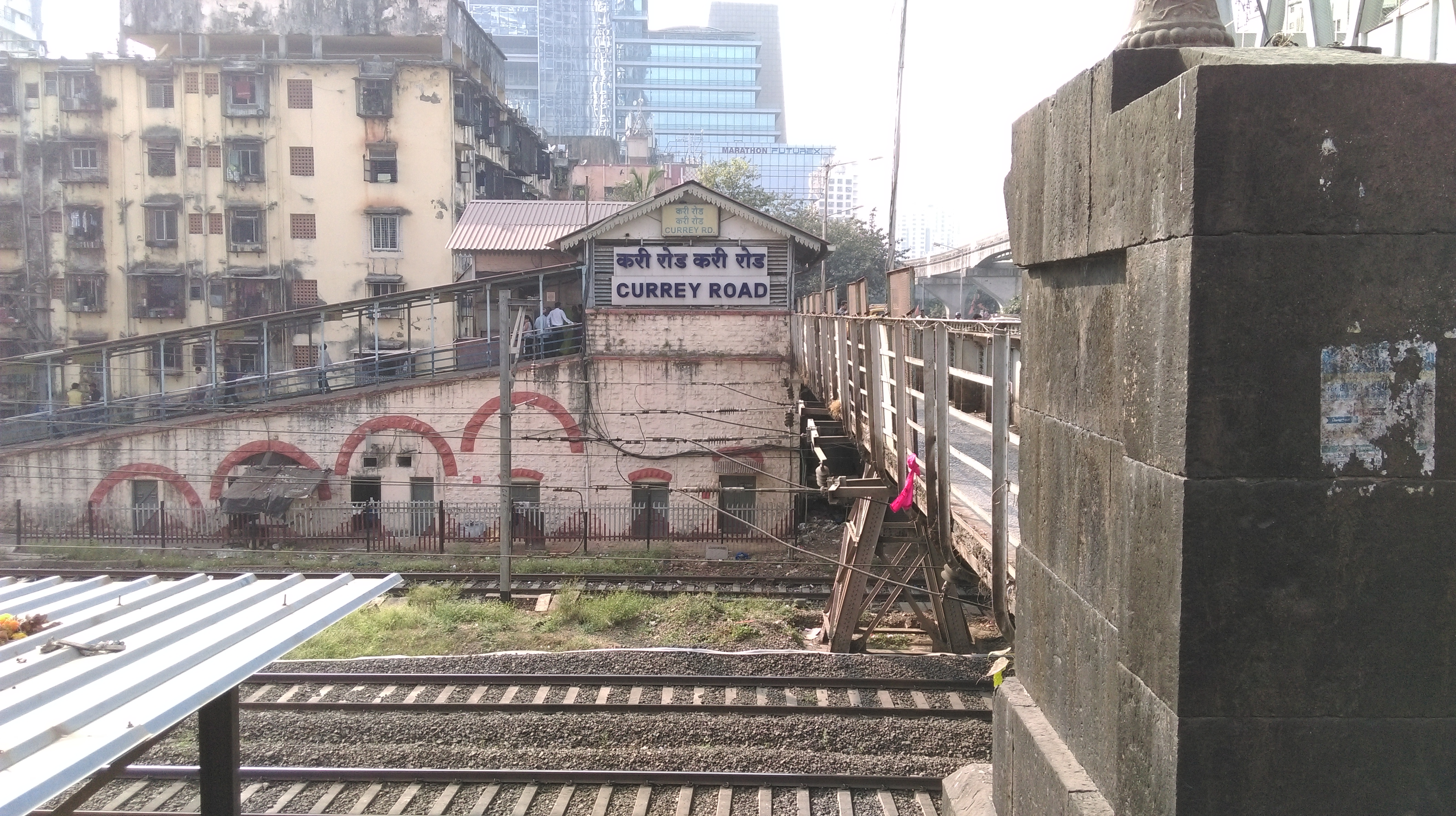

General information
- Coordinates: 18.994°N 72.833°E
- System: Indian Railways and Mumbai Suburban Railway station
- Owner: Ministry of Railways, Indian Railways
- Line: Central Line
- Platforms: 2
- Tracks: 4

Construction
- Structure type: Standard on-ground station
- Parking: No

Other information
- Status: Active
- Station code: CRD
- Fare zone: Central Railways

History
- Opened: 1 January 1884

Services
Preceding station	Mumbai Suburban Railway	Following station
Chinchpokli towards Chhatrapati Shivaji Terminus	Central line	Parel towards Kasara or Khopoli
Route map
Location
- Location within India Location within Mumbai

Currey Road (station code: CRD) is a railway station that serves the Lower Parel neighbourhood in Mumbai. It is on the Central line of the Mumbai Suburban Railway serving the areas of Lalbaug and Parel.

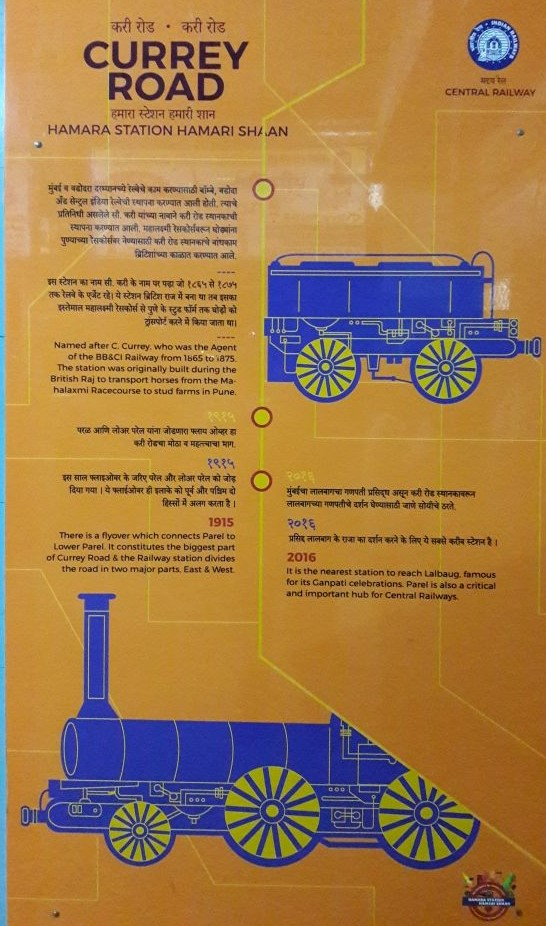
Station History Display Board placed near booking office, Curry Road, Mumbai, India

Currey Road is situated in central Mumbai and is surrounded by famous places like Lalbaug, Lower Parel. There is a flyover (constructed in 1915) which constitutes the biggest part of Currey Road. The Railway station divides the road into two major parts, East and West.

== History ==
Currey Road station was opened on 1 January 1884. It was named after Charles Currey, who served as the Agent (General Manager) of the neighbouring BB&CI Railway between 1865-75.

The station was originally built to carry horses during the British Raj. During the derby (horse race) season, a special train used to carry horses from the race course to the stud farms in Poona.

Work on a new Currey Road (along with Chinchpokli) began in February 1893, and was completed by 1895.

The station was partially burnt by Mill workers in 1908 to protest the arrest of Lokmanya Tilak.

== See also ==
- Currey Road Bridge
