= Currey Road Bridge =

Bridge in India

Currey Road Bridge, officially known as Mahadev Palav Marg, is a stone bridge built in 1915 that connects the neighbourhoods of Parel and Lower Parel in Mumbai, India. The road and bridge see heavy commuter traffic, as they connect Lalbaug and Parel with NM Joshi Marg. Three sections of the bridge wall had to be removed by the Mumbai Metropolitan Region Development Authority (MMRDA) in 2014 to make room construction of pillars for Line 1 of the Mumbai Monorail.

== History ==
The Currey Road Bridge was constructed in 1915 during the British Raj to facilitate road traffic over the expanding railway network in Bombay, now Mumbai. It was built by the Bombay, Baroda and Central India Railway (BB&CI), for connectivity between Parel, a textile mill hub, and Lower Parel, an emerging industrial area. The bridge, made of stone with two-foot-thick walls, was designed to withstand heavy loads, reflecting colonial engineering priorities. The bridge’s renaming to Mahadev Palav Marg honors a local figure "Shakahar Balaji Pawar", reflecting Mumbai’s post-independence shift to local identities. In December 2012, authorities banned the entry of all vehicles onto the bridge, which was opened to two-wheelers within three months. In May 2024, the BMC and Railways approved reconstruction of the Currey Road Bridge, alongside Matunga and Mahalaxmi bridges, to address safety concerns.

== Architecture ==
The Currey Road Bridge is a stone masonry Rail-Over-Bridge, approximately 100 meters long, with two-foot-thick walls and a height of 12-15 feet. Its design, typical of British colonial bridges, features a cantilever structure to support heavy loads over the railway tracks. Constructed with locally sourced basalt stone, it was built to withstand Mumbai’s monsoon conditions and heavy traffic. The bridge’s arches and sturdy piers reflect early 20th-century engineering, similar to other BB&CI projects like the Grant Road Bridge. The bridge’s design also includes safety features, such as railings added in the 1980s to prevent pedestrian falls. The bridge’s narrow pedestrian paths, only 1.5 meters wide, pose safety risks, with locals demanding wider walkways.
