= Shirgaon, Palghar district =

Village in Maharashtra

Shirgaon, Palghar (W)
- village
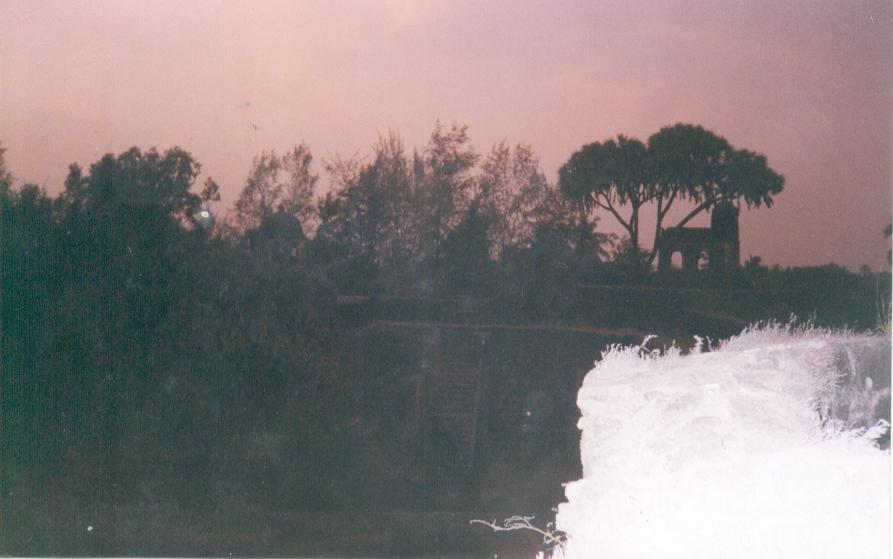
- Shirgaon fort

- Location in Maharashtra, India Shirgaon, Palghar (W) (India)
- Coordinates: 19.7°N 72.7°E
- Country: India
- State: Maharashtra
- District: Palghar
- Elevation: 0 m (0 ft)

Languages
  - Official: Marathi
- Time zone: UTC+5:30 (IST)
- PIN: 401405

Shirgaon is a village in the Palghar district of the state of Maharashtra, India. It can be reached by State Transport busses or other public transportation from Palghar Station on the Mumbai - Ahmedabad train route. It has an extremely long beach with Kelva Beach on one side and Satpati on the other.

Shirgaon, a village of Bhandari, Mali, Kolis (Mangela Kolis / Vaity), Vadval, Adivasi and Muslim Community.

Mahikawati temple of Vadry and Hanuman mandir of Tembhy are oldest temple in this village. Muslim community comes with sultan of Gujarat, bahadur Shah. During Somnath Looting by MOhd. Gazanavi, Somnath refugees took shelter in the 11th century by Gujarati Somnath Junagad Mali. They followed Maharashtrian customs instead Gujarati. They are farmers and major area of Shirgaon and Satpati is covered by them. Marathas (Mainly Bhandari and Koli Community) attacked on the Fort of Vasai, Kelwe, Mahim as well as Tarapore and won the battle.

== History ==
After the British war of 1857, the Coastal region of Maharashtra including Shirgaon, Kelwe, Mahim, Tarapore was captured by the British ruler.

The historical Name of Shirgaon during Portuguese rule was Sirgaon. In 1720, one of the ports of Bassein, Kalyan, was conquered by the Marathas, and in 1737, they took possession of Thane including all the forts in Salsette island and the forts of Parsica, Trangipara, Saibana (Present - Saivan, south bank of the Tansa river), Ilha das Vaccas - (Island of Arnala), Manora (Manor), Sabajo (Sambayo/Shabaz (near Belapur) - present day Belapur fort photo) the hills of Santa Cruz and Santa Maria.

The only places in the Northern Provinces that now remained with the Portuguese were Chaul (Revdanda), Caranja, Bandra, Versova, Bassein, Mahim, Quelme (Kelve Photo1) -(Kelve/Mahim), Sirgão (Present day Shirgao), Dahanu Sao Gens (Sanjan), Asserim (Asheri/Asherigad Photo1), Tarapor (Tarapur) and Daman.

In November 1738, Marathas led by Chimaji Appa, captured the fort of Dahanu and on 20 January 1739, Mahim capitulated, the loss of Mahim, was speedily followed by the capture of the forts of Quelme -(Kelve/Mahim), Sirgão (present Shirgaon), Tarapor (Present day Tarapur), and Asserim (Asheri/Asherigad) on 13 February 1739.

Shirgaon beach is a safe beach in western region of Maharashtra. Good sunset view, coconuts, forts, climate, silence, peaceful peoples and high quality fish at affordable price are some features of this village.

== Transport links ==
Shirgaon is situated 15 km away from Palghar. Easily accessible from Palghar Railway Station, you can take a shared auto/tempo (₹12 per person) or a State Transport (ST) bus to Satpati. It takes about 12-15 minutes to reach Shirgaon.

== Places to Visit ==
Siargaon Beach

Shirgaon Fort
