= Parel railway station =

Railway station in Mumbai, India

Parel परळ
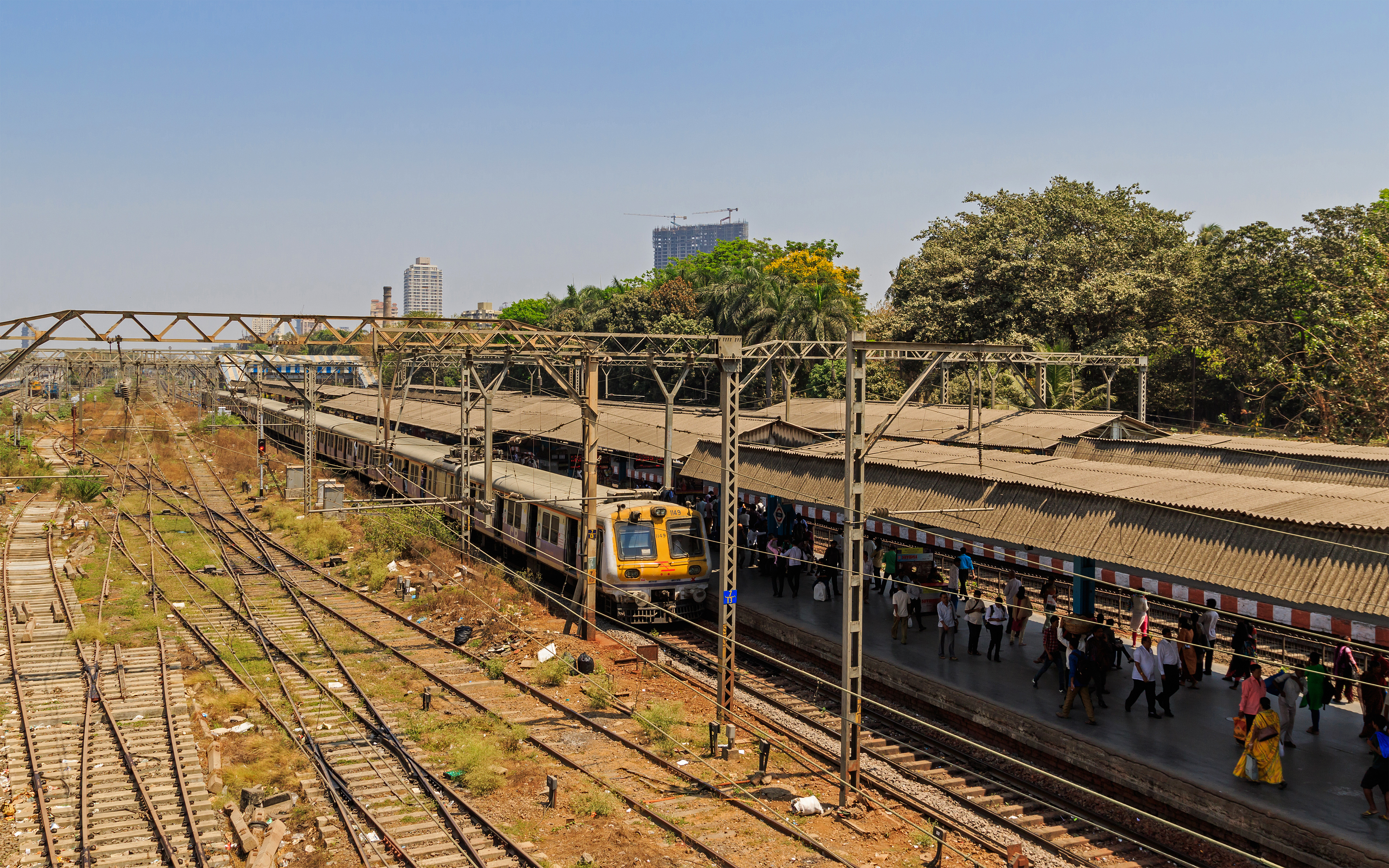

General information
- Coordinates: 19.009161°N 72.837608°E
- Elevation: 5.935 metres (19.47 ft)
- System: Mumbai Suburban Railway
- Owner: Ministry of Railways, Indian Railways
- Line: Central
- Platforms: 5

Construction
- Structure type: Standard on-ground station

Other information
- Status: Active
- Station code: PR
- Fare zone: Central Railways

History
- Opened: 9 December 1867

Services
| Preceding station | Mumbai Suburban Railway | Following station |
|---|---|---|
| Currey Road towards Chhatrapati Shivaji Terminus | Central line | Dadar towards Kasara or Khopoli |
| Lower Parel towards Churchgate | Western line transfer at Prabhadevi | Dadar towards Dahanu Road |
Route map
Location
- Location within Mumbai

Parel (station code: PR) is a railway station on the Central Line of the Mumbai Suburban Railway, serving the Parel neighbourhood of Mumbai. The next station south is Currey Road; the next station north is Dadar. A footbridge links Parel on the Central Line to Prabhadevi on Western Line.

Parel railway station was opened on 9 December 1867. Platforms 4 and 5 are reserved for employees of the Parel railway workshop and for some Fast local train stops and platforms 1, 2 and 3 are open to the general public. The station sells around 2.2 million tickets each year.

== History ==
The railway station on the Parel side was opened to the public on 9 December 1867 for direct connectivity from Parel to other stations on the Central Railway network. In December 1888, plans for an upgraded station were sent to London, and the plans materialised in early 1890s.

Parel is of historical importance in Railway history, for it was the halting point for the Locomotive Lord Falkland, on its first trip on 23 February 1852 between Byculla and Parel. This was probably because the Governor residence was at Parel back then. Lord Falkland was Bombay's first steam Locomotive, and was later also used for the trial run of the first train that happened on 18 November the same year.(prior to the official journey on 16 April 1853)

The Parel Rail Workshops located south of the station were built between 1877 and 1879 on 43 acres of land, due to the original Workshops at Byculla being cramped. Vulcan Foundry Locomotive no.3, one of the first locos sent for GIPR after 1850 was said to be driving a rolling mill in the Parel workshop as late as 1916. During the First World War, it was repurposed to make explosive shells, grenades, and armored vehicles.

On 4 March 2019, the terminal platform on the slow line of the Parel side was inaugurated by Piyush Goyal (Minister of Railways) for reducing the higher passenger pressure load at Dadar railway station. Which it was demanded for many years by the people for easier access on the Central side.

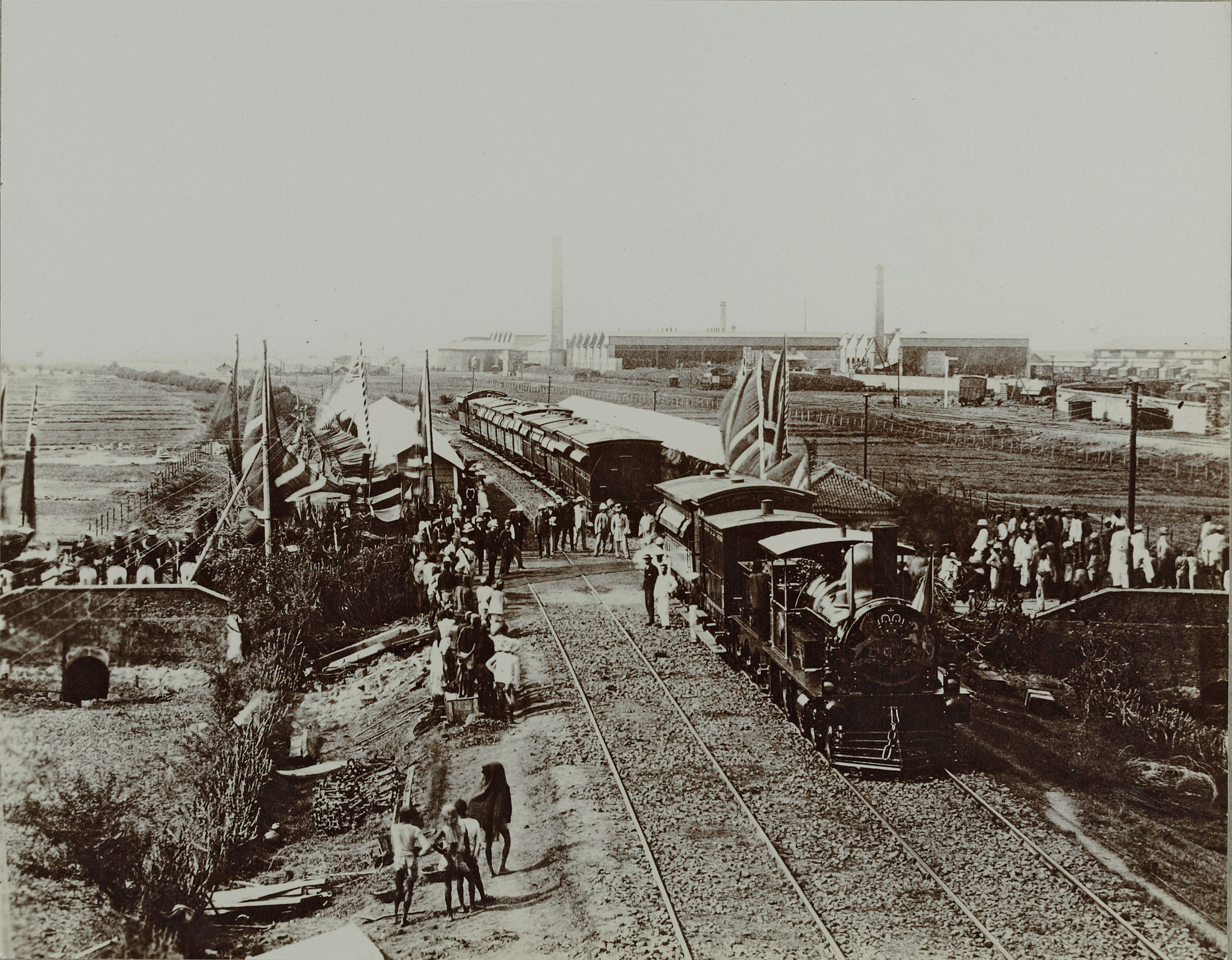
Departure of the Duke of Edinburgh from Parel station

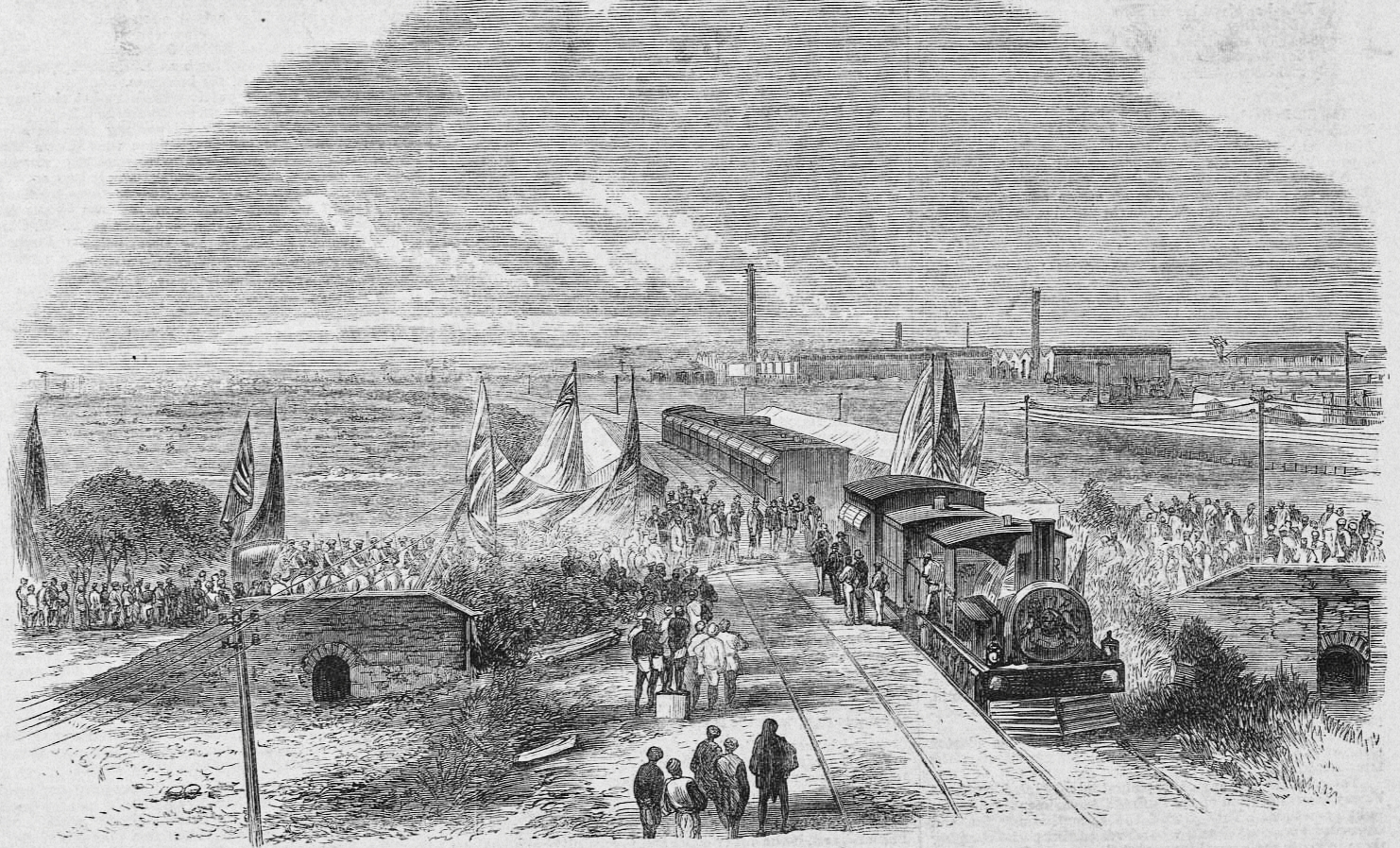
Engraving based on the same image from Illustrated London News, 23-4-1870

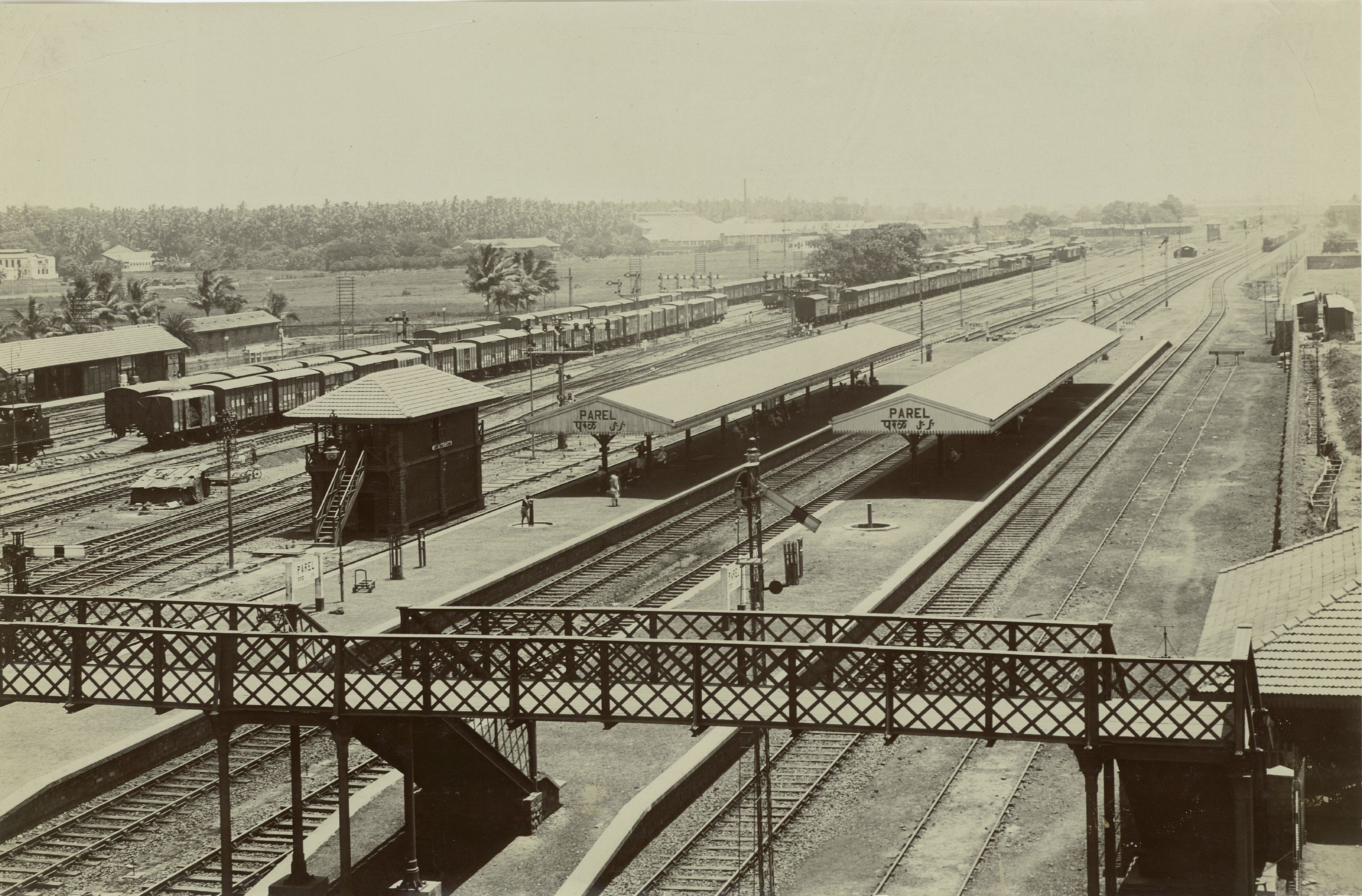
Parel railway station, around 1900

== Foot over-bridges ==
Parel railway station has only one foot over-bridge (FOB) on the southern side of the platform. This creates problems for commuters during peak hours. Due to this, commuters used to cross the tracks on to the adjoining platform 3 and use the FOB of that platform. This prompted the Railways to put up a fence between the platforms in order to stop commuters from crossing the tracks. This has increased the pressure on the over-bridge even more and hence forced the Railways into assigning the Railway Protection Force and Home Guard to help commuters cross the bridge and prevent any stampedes. They also protect the commuters from any approaching trains.

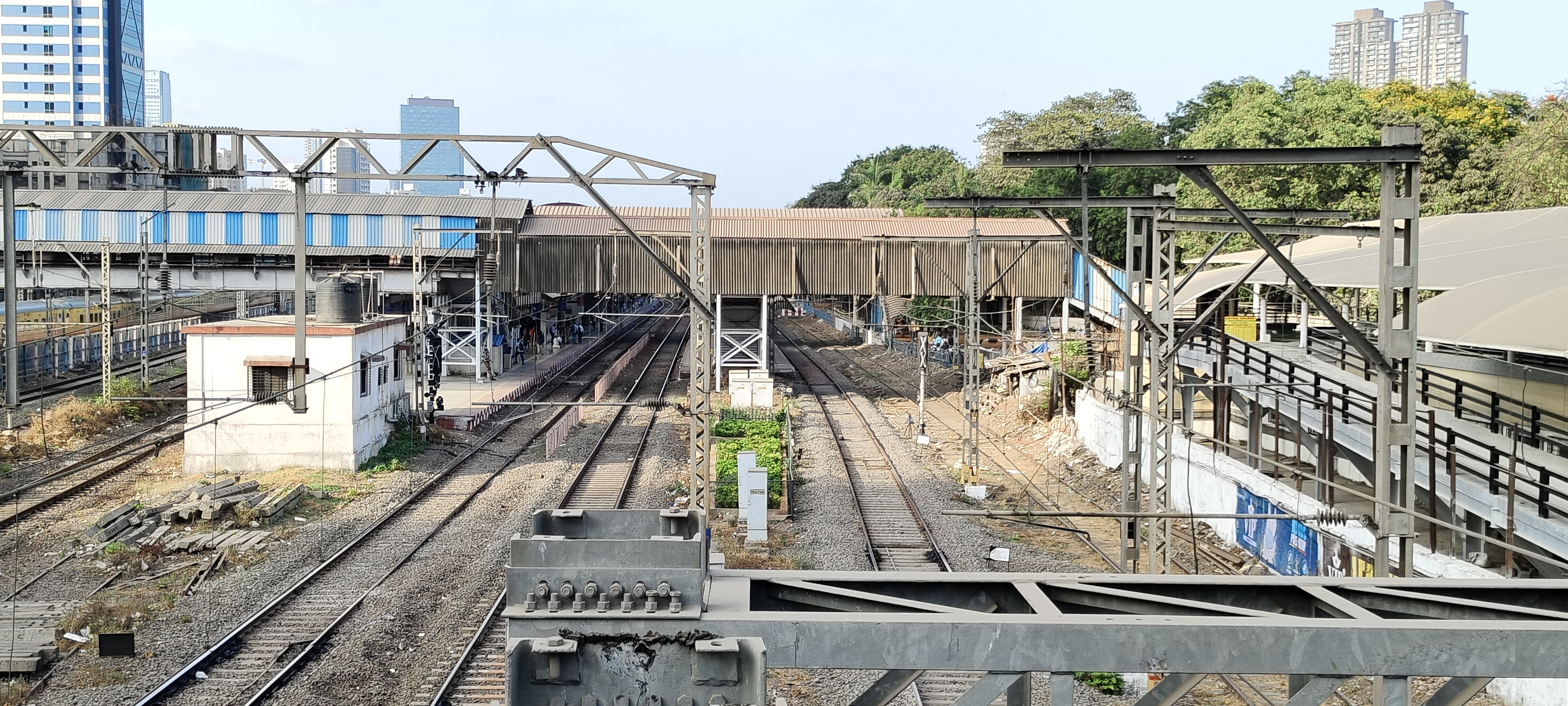
A Northward view of Parel railway station from Elphinstone Rd. Bridge

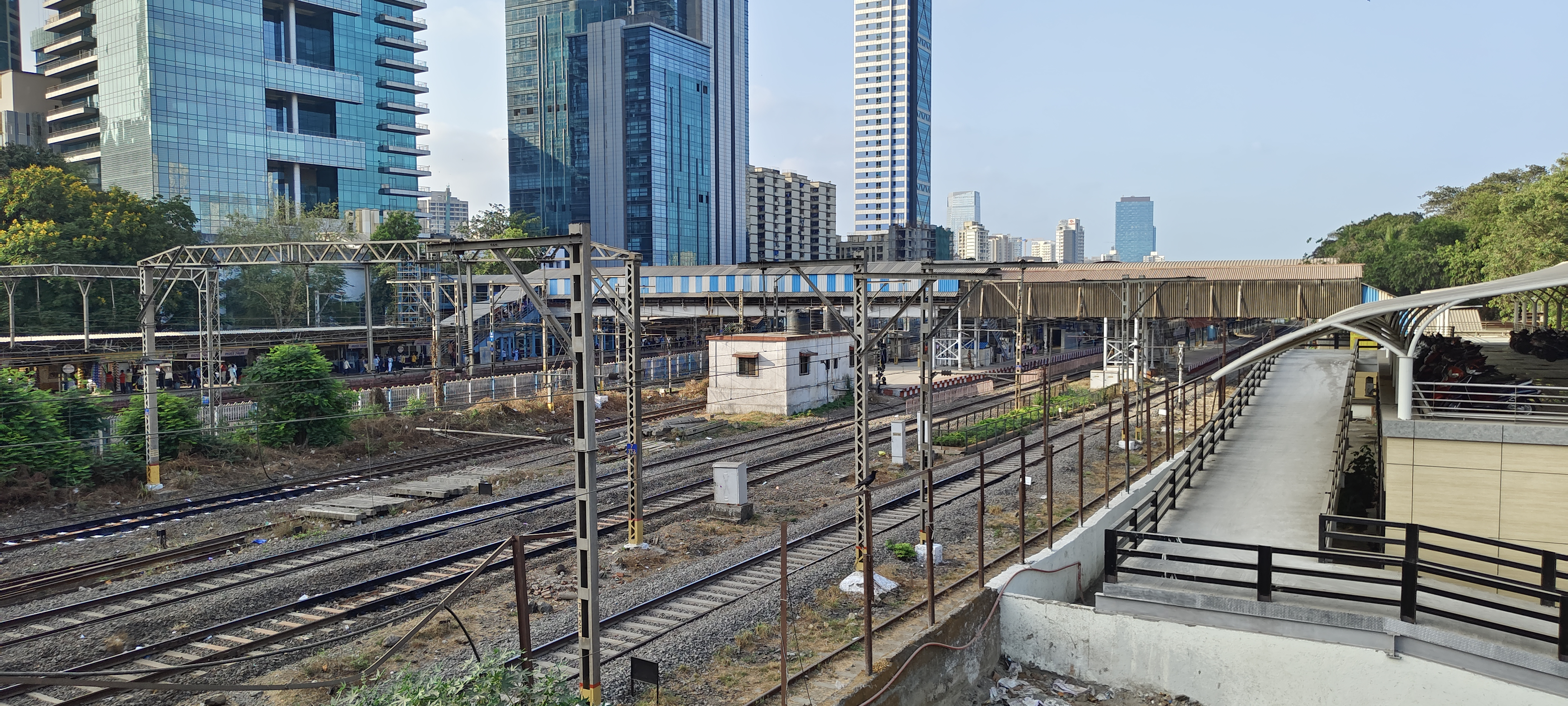
Northward view of the stations from Elphinstone Rd. Bridge, east side

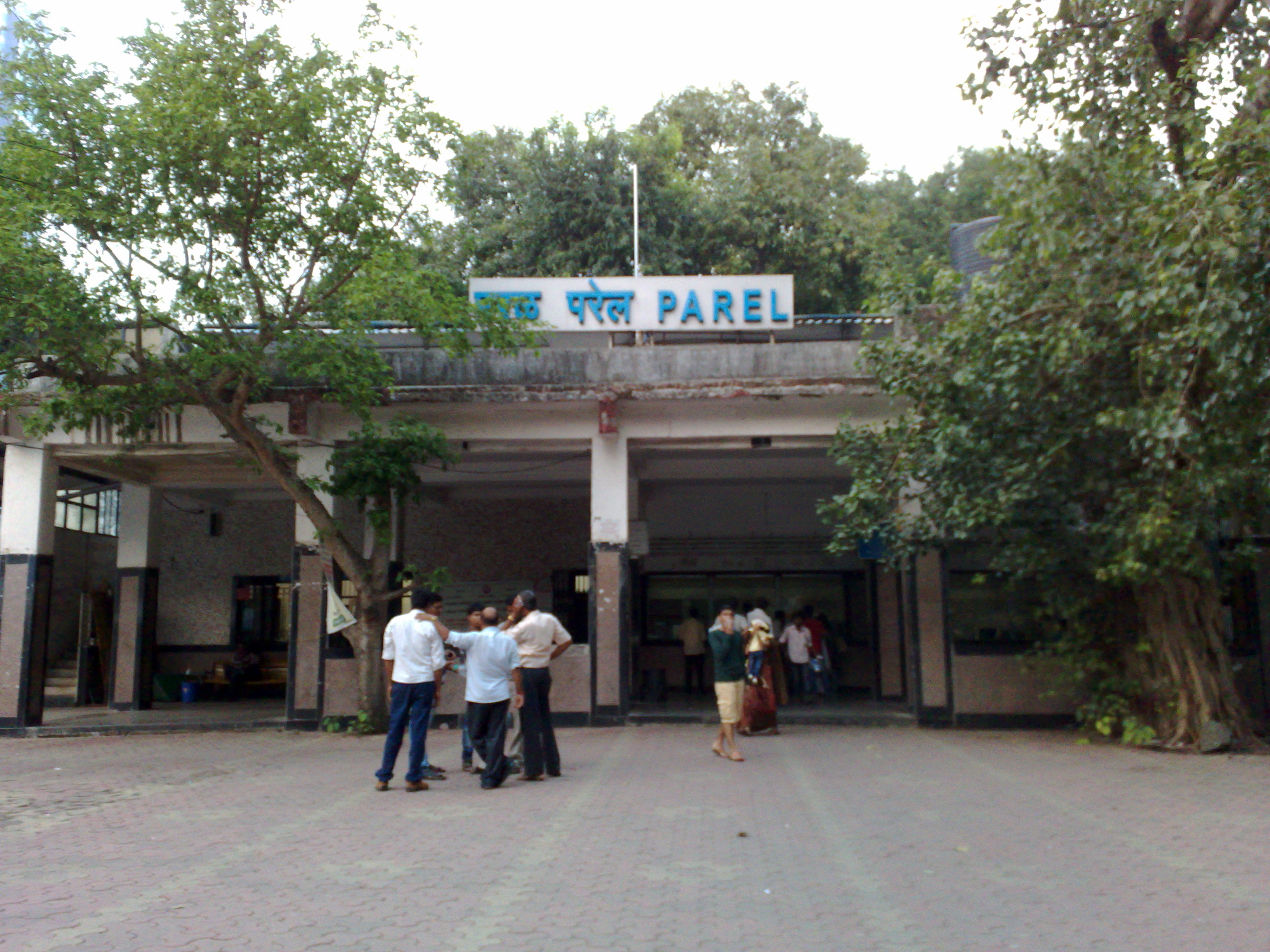
Entrance to the railway station on Parel side

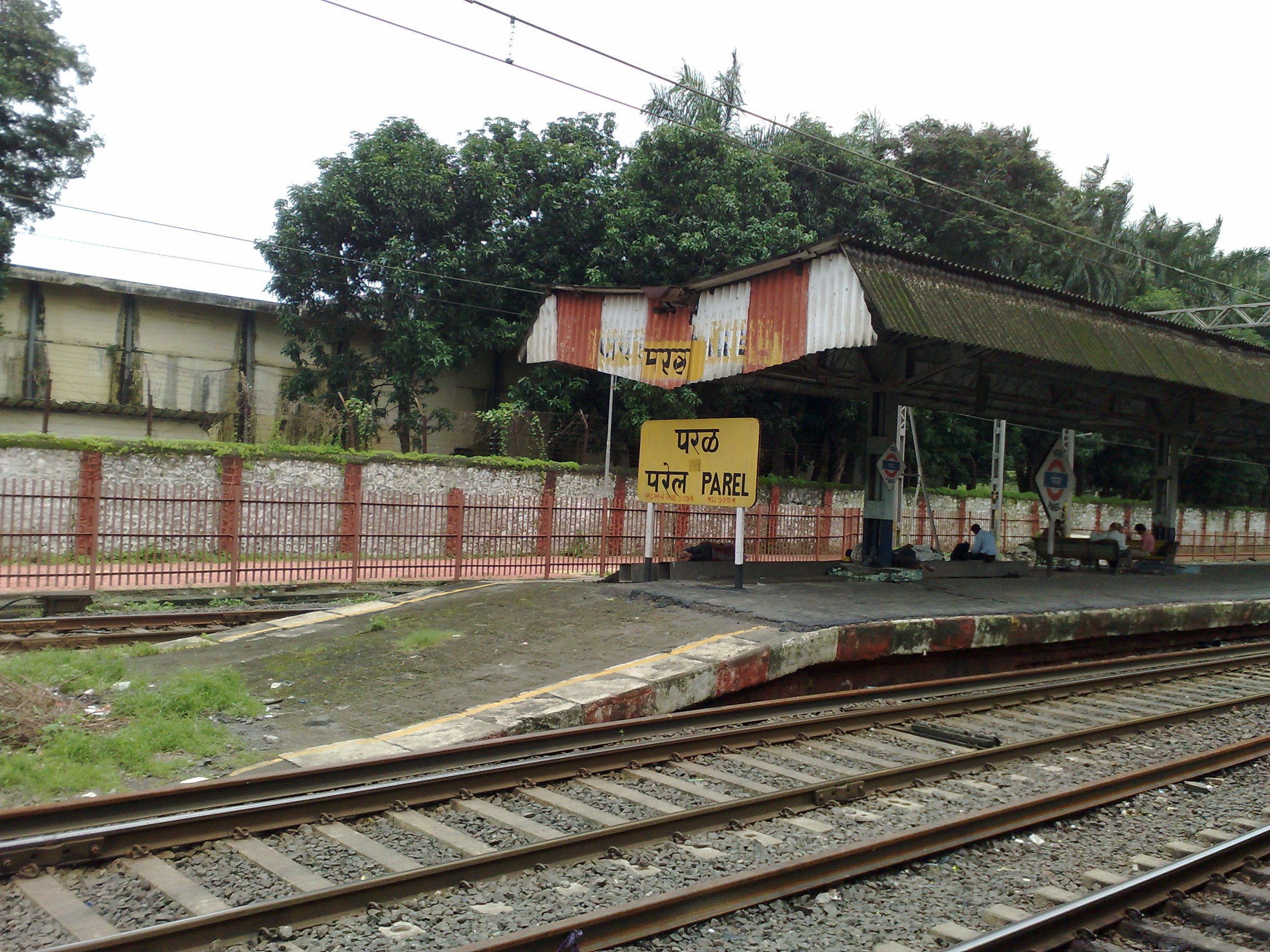
Stationboard on Parel side

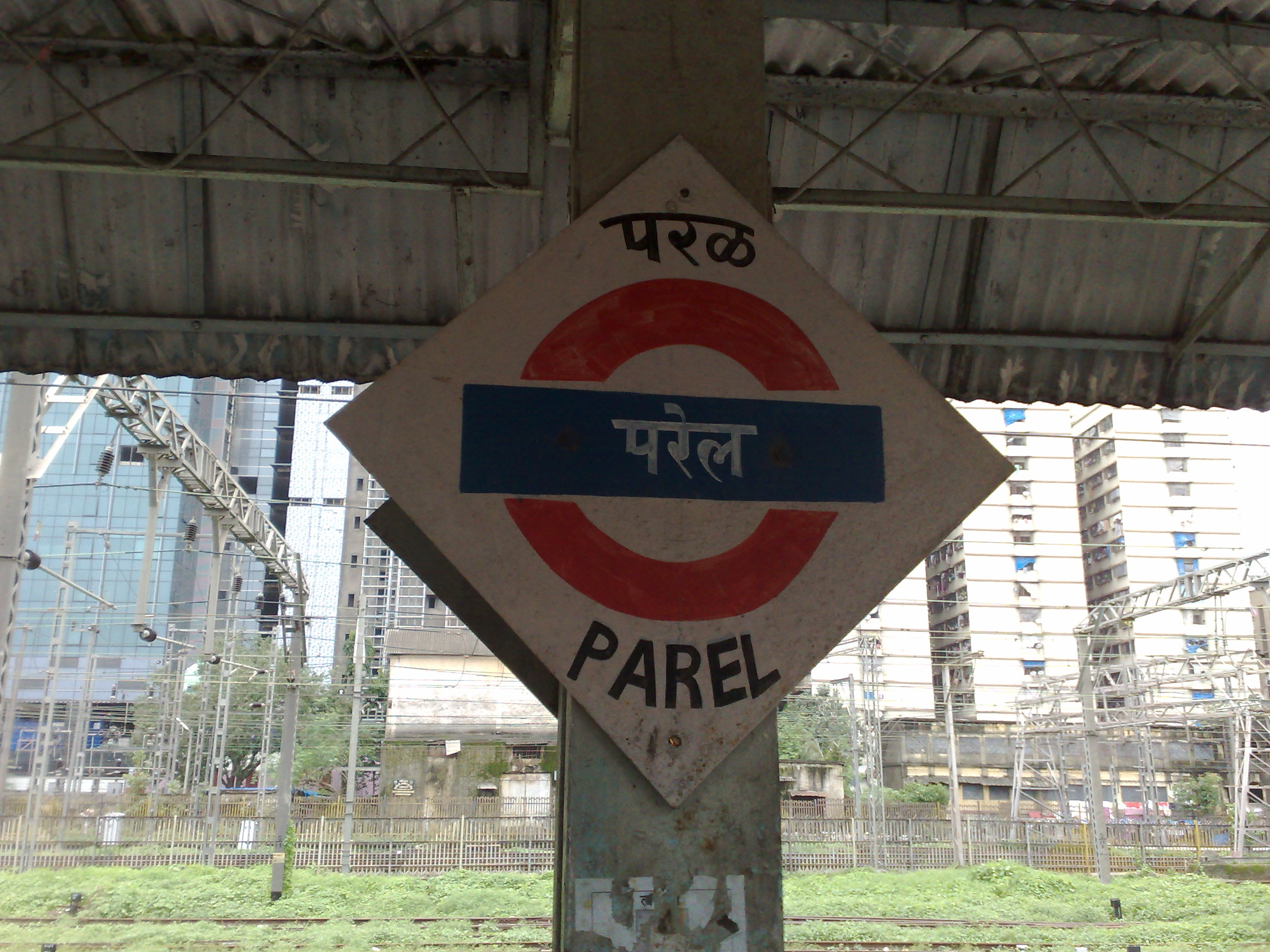
Platformboard on Parel railway station side
