= Statue of Equality =

Statue of Equality may refer to:

- Statue of Equality (Ambedkar), a statue of B. R. Ambedkar under construction in Mumbai
- Statue of Equality (Ramanuja), a statue of Ramanuja in Hyderabad
