= William James (disambiguation) =

William James (1842–1910) was an American psychologist and philosopher.

William James may also refer to:

== Military ==
- William James (Royal Navy officer, born 1881) (1881–1974), British admiral
- William C. James (1896–1974), U.S. Marine Corps general
- William James (Australian general) (1930–2015), Australian Army general
- William K. James (1935–2022), U.S. Air Force general
- William Levis James (1833–1903), American military officer

== Politics ==
- Sir William James, 1st Baronet (1721–1783), Bombay Marine officer and politician
- William James (Carlisle MP) (1791–1861), member of parliament for Carlisle 1820–1826
- William A. James (1838–1893), American politician in Illinois
- William H. James (1831–1920), governor of Nebraska
- W. Frank James (1873–1945), U.S. representative from Michigan
- William S. James (1914–1993), state treasurer of Maryland
- William James (MP for Kent), member of parliament for Kent, 1654–59
- Bill James (politician) (William G. James, 1930–2022), American politician

== Sports ==
- William James (cricketer) (fl. 1858–1881), English cricketer
- William James (rugby league), rugby league footballer in the 1920s and 1930s
- William James (bowls) (born 1969), Eswatini (formerly named Swaziland) lawn bowler
- William James (American football) (born 1979), American footballer
- Knucks James (William James, 1878–1966), American baseball player
- Bill James (American football) (William Nelson James, 1897–1969), American college football player and coach
- Bill James (pitcher, born 1887) (William Henry James, 1887–1942), American baseball player
- Bill James (pitcher, born 1892) (William Lawrence James, 1892–1971), American baseball player
- Billy James (Australian footballer) (William Roy James, 1900–1966), Australian rules footballer
- Billy James (Welsh footballer) (William John James, 1921–1980), Welsh professional footballer
- Billy James (footballer, born 1891) (William Ebsworth James, 1891–1960), English footballer
- Billy James (rugby union) (William John James, born 1956), Welsh rugby union player
- Will James (rugby, born 1902) (William P. James, 1902–1972), Welsh rugby union and league player

== Other ==
- William James (bishop) (1542–1617), English academic and bishop of Durham, 1606–17
- William James (slave trader) (1735–1798), operating out of the Port of Liverpool
- William James (railway promoter) (1771–1837), British
- William James (naval historian) (1780–1827), British naval historian during the Age of Sail
- William Milbourne James (judge) (1807–1881), British judge
- William James (engineer) (1854–1889), British engineer
- William Dodge James (1854–1912), big game hunter
- William James (photographer) (1866–1948), British-Canadian photographer
- William James (priest) (1832–1896), Welsh Anglican priest
- William P. James (1870–1940), U.S. federal judge
- William Warwick James (1874–1965), British dentist and maxillofacial surgeon
- William G. James (1892–1977), Australian pianist
- William "Froggie" James (died 1909), African-American man lynched in Cairo, Illinois
- Billy James (drummer) (William James, 1936–2009), American jazz drummer
- Will James (artist) (William Roderick James, 1892–1942), Canadian-born western artist and author

== See also ==
- Willie James (1920–2016), American civil rights activist
- Willy F. James Jr. (1920–1945), Medal of Honor recipient
- Bill James (disambiguation)
- Billy James (disambiguation)
- Will James (disambiguation)
- James Williams (disambiguation)
