= James Williams =

James Williams may refer to:

== Entertainment ==
- James Williams (musician) (1951–2004), American jazz pianist
- James H. Williams III (born 1965), American comic book writer and artist
- James J. Williams (1853–1926), English photographer
- James Dixon Williams (1877–1934), American film producer
- James D-Train Williams (born 1962), American singer-songwriter and actor
- James Lee Williams (1992–2025), British drag queen (stage name: The Vivienne)
- James K. Williams, Liberian rapper
- James R. Williams (cartoonist) (1888–1957), known as J. R. Williams, Canadian cartoonist
- Kimo Williams (born 1950), American composer, musician and professor

== Military ==
- James Williams (Revolutionary War) (1740–1780), colonel from South Carolina
- James Monroe Williams (1833–1907), American Civil War soldier
- James Howard Williams (1897–1958), British soldier and elephant expert in Burma
- James E. Williams (1930–1999), Medal of Honor in the U.S. Navy
- James A. Williams (1932–2017), U.S. Army general
- James L. Williams, U.S. Marines general
- USS James E. Williams, an American warship

== Politics ==
- James Wray Williams (1792–1842), U.S. Representative from Maryland
- James Williams (ambassador) (1796–1869), to Ottoman Empire
- James D. Williams (1808–1880), U.S. Representative from Indiana
- James Williams (Ohio politician) (1822–1892), Republican
- James Williams (Delaware politician) (1825–1899), U.S. Representative
- James E. Williams (Atlanta mayor) (1826–1900), Atlanta mayor after the Civil War
- James E. Williams (East St. Louis mayor) (1921–1983)
- James Henry Williams (1831–1889), British born Episcopal minister and Virginia politician
- James M. Williams (1850–1909), Ohio House and Ohio Senate
- James R. Williams (politician) (1850–1923), U.S. Representative from Illinois
- James R. Williams (lawyer) (1936–2020), candidate for lieutenant governor of Ohio
- James D. Williams (Pennsylvania politician) (1943–1985), Pennsylvania House
- James Edwin Williams (1856–1917), British trade unionist
- James Williams (labor leader), American president of painters' union
- James A. Williams Jr., American labor union leader
- James Harrison Williams, member of the Iowa House of Representatives

== Religion ==
- James Williams (priest, died 1872) (1790–1872), Welsh Anglican cleric
- James Williams (bishop) (1825–1892), Canadian Anglican cleric and educator
- James Williams (archdeacon of Ardfert) (died 1724), Irish Anglican priest
- James Williams (archdeacon of Wrexham) (died 1953), Welsh Anglican priest
- James Kendrick Williams (born 1936), American Catholic bishop
- J. Henry Williams (1831–1889), American Episcopal priest and philanthropist

== Sport ==
=== American football ===
- James H. Williams (1920–1999), college football and college baseball coach and athletics administrator
- James Williams (American football coach) (1923–1999), high school and college coach
- James Williams (end) (1928–2015), college football end
- Jamie Williams (American football) (born 1960), tight end
- James Williams (cornerback) (born 1967)
- James Williams (linebacker, born 1968)
- James O. Williams (born 1968), offensive tackle
- James Williams (wide receiver) (born 1978)
- James Williams (linebacker, born 2003)
- James Williams (defensive lineman) (born 2004)

=== Association football ===
- James Williams (Welsh footballer) (1885–1916)
- James Williams (Australian footballer) (born 1937)
- James Williams-Richardson (born 1988), Anguillan international footballer
- James Williams (Irish footballer)
- Jimmy Williams (footballer, born 1982), English footballer

=== Baseball ===
- James Williams (baseball), co-owner of the Cincinnati Reds 1981–1984
- Jimmy Williams (coach) (or James Bernard Williams, 1926–2016), minor league manager
- Jimy Williams (1943–2024)

=== Basketball ===
- James Williams (basketball) (born 1979), American streetball player
- Fly Williams (born 1953), American ABA and CBA player

=== Other sports ===
- James Williams (British fencer) (1966–2024)
- James Williams (cricketer) (born 1973), Welsh
- James Williams (field hockey) (1878–1929), British
- James Leighman Williams (born 1985), American fencer

== Other uses ==
- James Miller Williams (1818–1890), Canadian oil businessman
- James Nelson Williams (1837–1915), New Zealand runholder, orchardist and entrepreneur
- James Leon Williams (1852–1932), American dental researcher
- James Steele Williams (1896–1957), American paleontologist
- James Arthur Williams (1930–1990), American antiques dealer
- James Wilson Williams (born 1982), American academic
- James Oladipo Williams (died 1999), Nigerian jurist and judge
- James F. Williams, American librarian, University of Colorado
- James H. Williams Jr., American mechanical engineer, MIT
- Jamie Williams, president of the Wilderness Society

== See also ==
- Jim Williams (disambiguation)
- William James (disambiguation)
