= Jim Williams =

Jim or Jimmy Williams may refer to:

== Sports ==
=== American football ===
- Jim Williams (American football, born 1928) (1928–1989), American football coach
- Jimmy Williams (linebacker) (born 1960), American football linebacker
- Jimmy Williams (cornerback, born 1979) (1979–2022), American football cornerback
- Jimmy Williams (cornerback, born 1984) (born 1984), American football cornerback

=== Association football (soccer) ===
- Jimmy Williams (footballer, born 1882) (1882–1960), English footballer
- Jimmy Williams (footballer, born 1888) (1888–1951), English footballer (Stoke City)
- Jimmy Williams (footballer, born 1982), English footballer

=== Baseball ===
- Jim Williams (outfielder, born 1906), American outfielder in the Negro leagues from 1931 to 1944
- Jim Williams (outfielder, born 1947), American outfielder in MLB from 1969 to 1970
- Jimmy Williams (coach) (1926–2016), Canadian minor-league player and manager; Baltimore Orioles first base coach from 1981 to 1987
- Jimmy Williams (baseball manager) (1847–1918), American baseball manager in the 1880s
- Jimmy Williams (second baseman) (1876–1965), American second baseman in MLB from 1899 to 1909
- Jimy Williams (1943–2024), American infielder, coach, and manager (Blue Jays, Red Sox, Astros) in MLB

=== Basketball ===
- Jim Williams (basketball) (1915–2007), head basketball coach at Colorado State University from 1954 to 1980
- Jimmy Williams (basketball coach), assistant basketball coach at University of Memphis, University of Minnesota, and Oklahoma State; interim head coach at Minnesota (1985–86)
- Jimmy Williams (basketball player) (born 1986), Togolese basketball player
- Jimmie Williams, American college basketball coach

=== Other sports ===
- Jim Williams (curler) (1915–1987) Canadian curler
- Jimmy Williams (rugby league), rugby league footballer of the 1920s
- Jim Williams (powerlifter) (1940–2007) American powerlifter
- Jim Williams (darts player) (born 1984), Welsh darts player
- Jim Williams (rugby union) (born 1968), Munster forwards coach and ex-player
- Jimmy Williams (cyclist), Scottish cyclist

== Other people ==
- Jim Williams (author) (born 1947), author and lawyer
- Jim Williams (analog designer) (1948–2011), analog circuit designer and technical author
- Jim Williams (news anchor) (born 1957), news anchor at WBBM-TV in Chicago
- Jim Williams (composer), Music for Hotel Babylon
- Jim Williams (militia leader) (circa 1830–1871), African-American soldier and militia leader
- Jim Williams (pastor) (1935–2015), AoG pastor from New Zealand
- Jim Williams (politician) (1926–2016), American politician
- Jimmy Williams (unionist), American labor union leader
- James Arthur Williams (1930–1990), person popularized in the 1994 book Midnight in the Garden of Good and Evil
- Jimmy Williams (Neighbours), a character from the Australian soap opera Neighbours

== See also ==
- James Williams (disambiguation)
