= Vasind railway station =

Railway Station in Maharashtra, India

Vasind
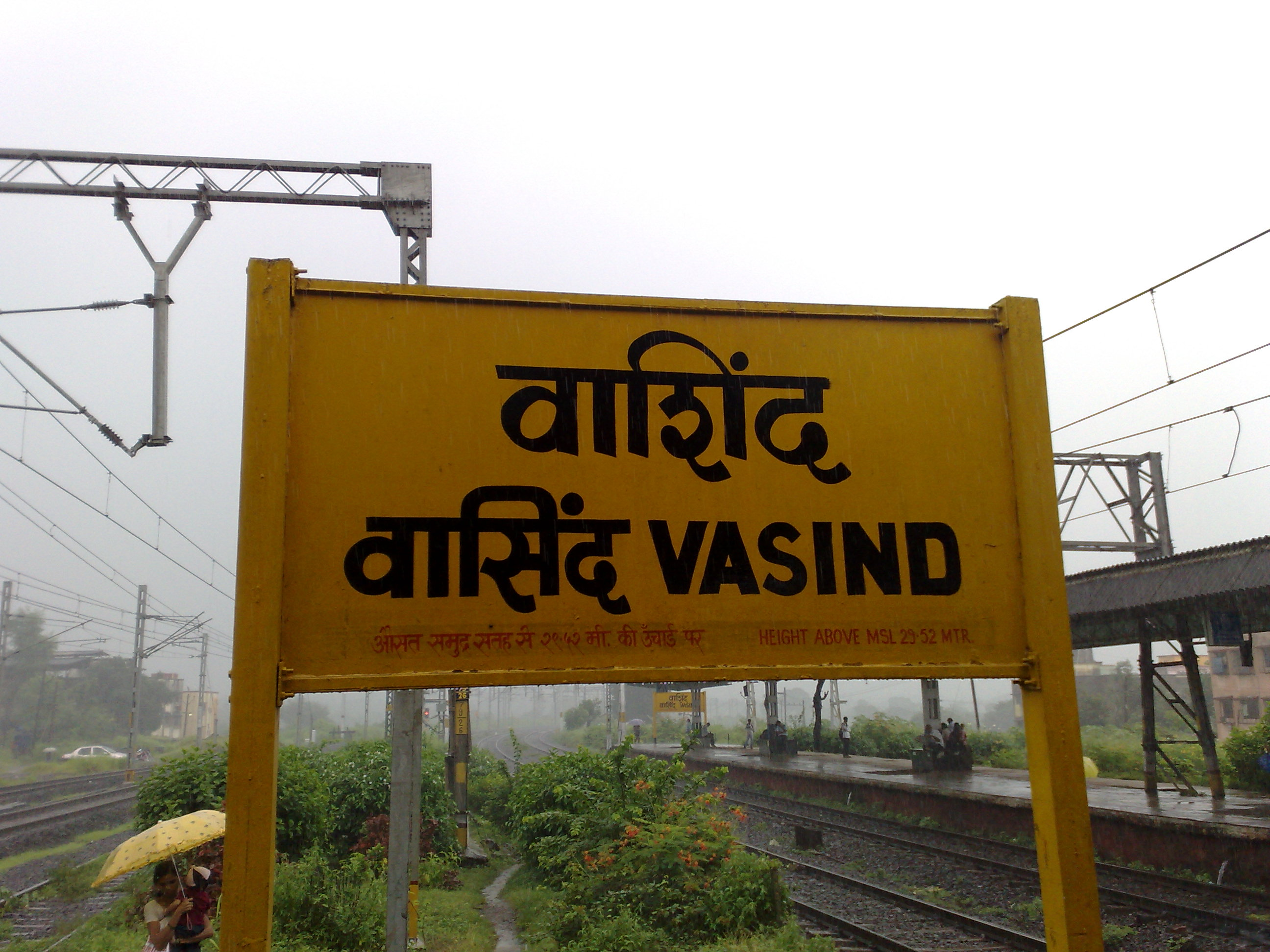

General information
- Coordinates: 19.406725°N 73.267704°E
- Elevation: 29.52 metres (96.9 ft)
- System: Indian Railways and Mumbai Suburban Railway station
- Owner: Ministry of Railways, Indian Railways
- Line: Central Line

Other information
- Status: Active
- Station code: VSD
- Fare zone: Central Railways

Services
Preceding station	Mumbai Suburban Railway	Following station
Khadavli towards Chhatrapati Shivaji Terminus	Central line	Asangaon towards Kasara
Route map
Location
- Location within India Location within Maharashtra

Vasind (station code: VSD) is a railway station on the Central line of the Mumbai Suburban Railway network. Khadavli is the previous stop and Asangaon is the next stop.

== Geography ==
The Vasind Railway Station is in the town of Vasind in the Indian state of Maharashtra. The station is located between Manmad Junction and Kalyan Junction. The station is located about one kilometer away from the JSW Vasind Steel Works, a large facility making coated steel.

== Train Information ==
This station has a total of two platforms and no trains terminate or originate at this station. The line that this station is on is located on an electrified line.

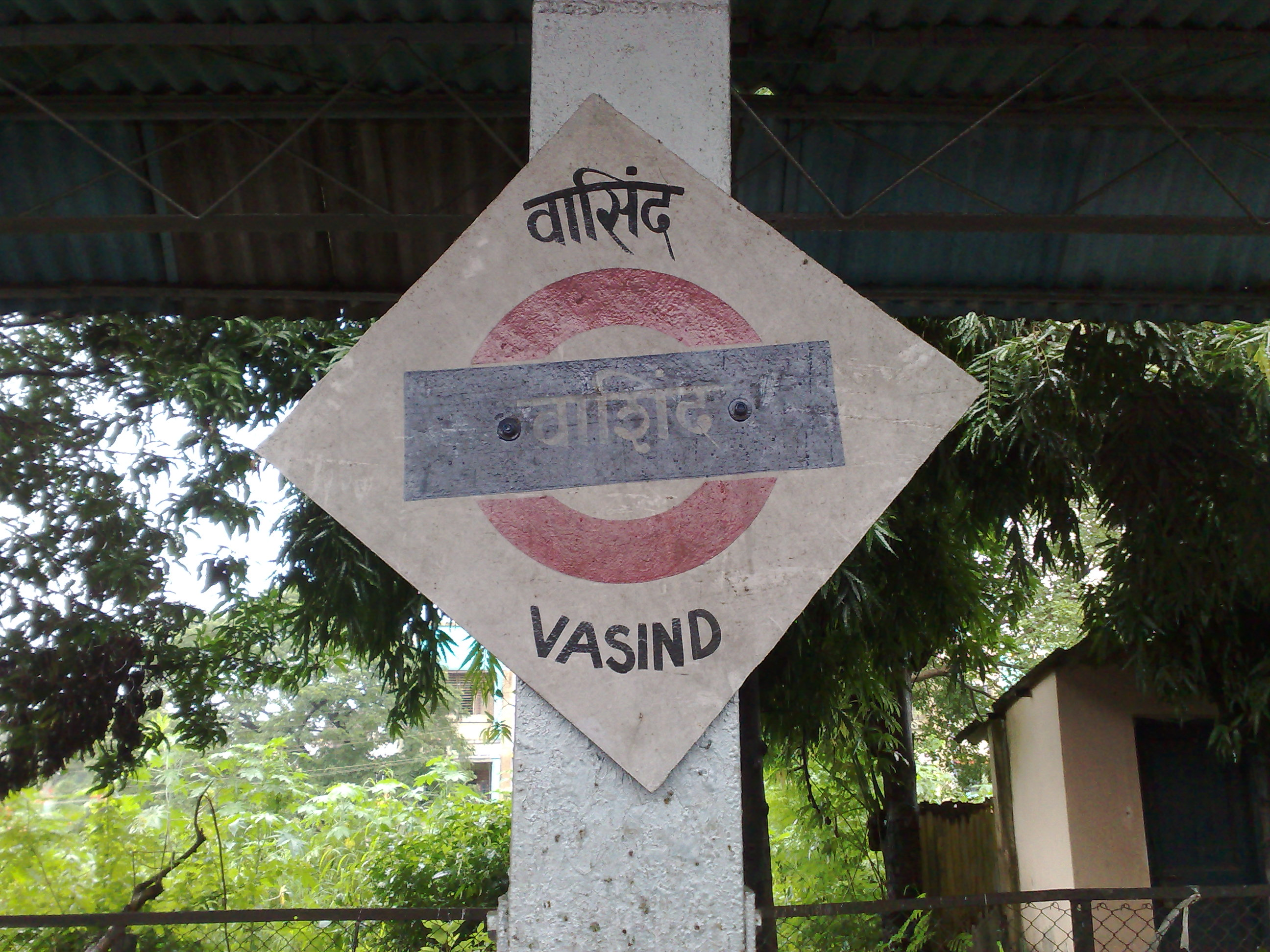
Vasind railway station – Platform board

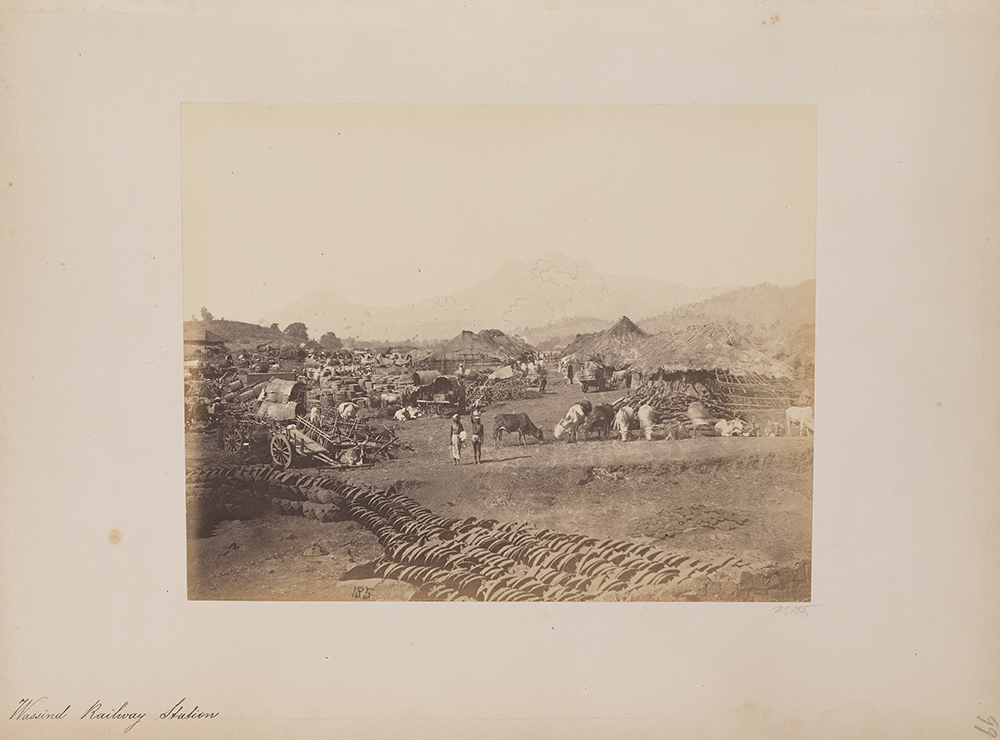
Vasind station (c. 1855–1862)
