= Atgaon railway station =

Railway station in Maharashtra, India

Atgaon
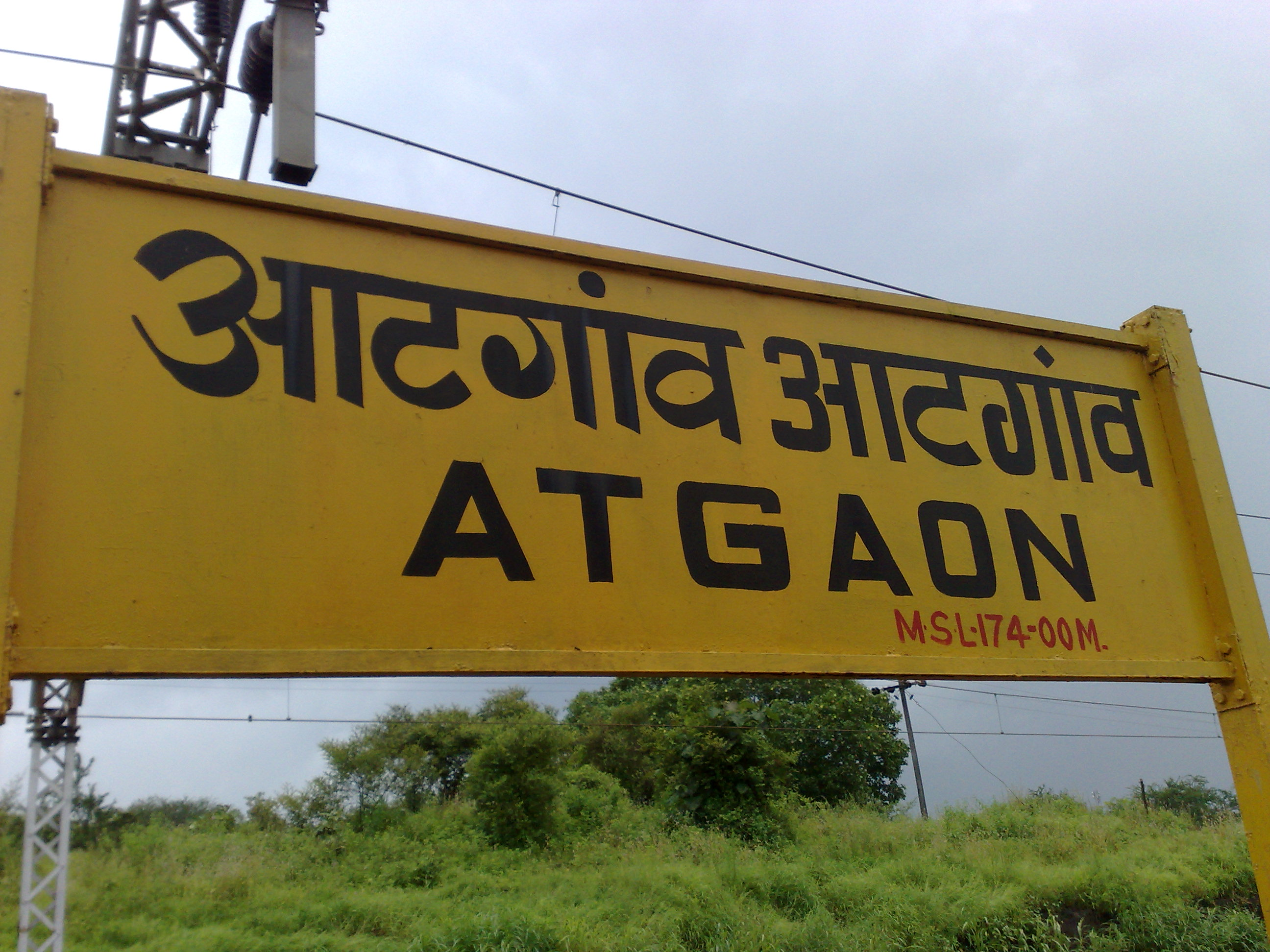

General information
- Coordinates: 19.503114°N 73.328625°E
- Elevation: 174.000 metres (570.866 ft)
- System: Indian Railways and Mumbai Suburban Railway station
- Owner: Ministry of Railways, Indian Railways
- Line: Central Line
- Platforms: 2

Construction
- Structure type: Standard on-ground station

Other information
- Status: Active
- Station code: ATG
- Fare zone: Central Railways

History
- Opened: 24 October 1864

Services
Preceding station	Mumbai Suburban Railway	Following station
Asangaon towards Chhatrapati Shivaji Terminus	Central line	Thansit towards Kasara
Route map
Location
- Location within India Location within Maharashtra

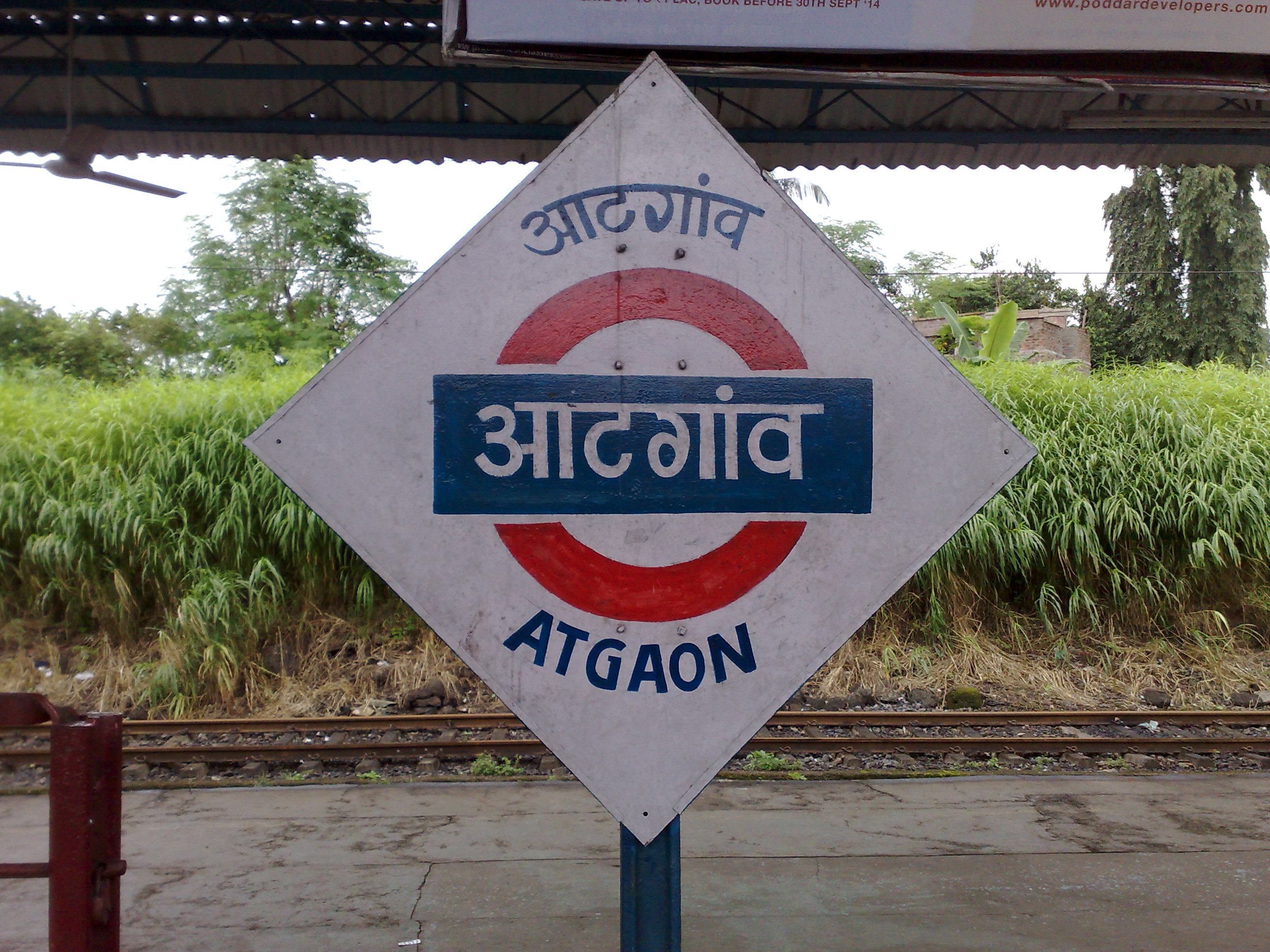
Atgaon railway station - Platformboard

Atgaon railway station (station code: ATG) is a railway station on the Central line of the Mumbai Suburban Railway network. Asangaon is the previous stop and Thansit is the next stop.

Atgaon translates to "eight villages" in Devangiri. It was the location of the DD serial Intezaar in 1991.

In addition to Atgaon village, the station also serves the nearby Pundhe industrial area and village.
