= Will James =

Will James may refer to:

- Will James (artist) (1892–1942), Canadian-born western artist and author
- Will James (rugby, born 1902) (1902–1972), Welsh rugby union and league player
- Will James (rugby union, born 1976), Welsh rugby union player
- Will James, bassist for Papa Roach

== See also ==
- Willy F. James Jr. (1920–1945), Medal of Honor recipient
- William James (disambiguation)
- Bill James (disambiguation)
