= Billy James =

Billy James may refer to:

- Billy James (Australian footballer) (1900–1966), Australian rules footballer
- Billy James (Welsh footballer) (1921–1980), Welsh professional footballer
- Billy James (footballer, born 1891) (1891–1960), English footballer
- Billy James (publicist), American music publicist and talent scout
- Billy James (drummer) (1936–2009), American jazz drummer
- Billy T. James (1948–1991), New Zealand comedian
- Billy James (basketball) (born 1950), American professional basketball player
- Billy James (rugby union) (born 1956), Welsh rugby union player
- Ant-Bee (born 1960), born Billy James, American publicist, musician, and author
- Billy James, co-host of American radio show John Boy and Billy

== See also ==
- Bill James (disambiguation)
- William James (disambiguation)
