= Chinchavali Tarf Rahur =

Village in Maharashtra, India

Vandre village
- village
- Location in Maharashtra, India Vandre village (India)
- Coordinates: 19.3536547°N 73.2072342°E
- Country: India
- State: Maharashtra
- District: Thane
- Taluka: Bhiwandi
- Elevation: 15 m (49 ft)

Population (2011)
  - Total: 186
- Time zone: UTC+5:30 (IST)
- 2011 census code: 552611

Chinchavali Tarf Rahur is a village in the Thane district of Maharashtra, India. It is located in the Bhiwandi taluka. Khadavli is the nearest railway station.

== Demographics ==
According to the 2011 census of India, Chinchavali Tarf Rahur has 33 households. The effective literacy rate (i.e. the literacy rate of population excluding children aged 6 and below) is 69.57%.

Demographics (2011 Census)
| | Total | Male | Female |
|---|---|---|---|
| Population | 186 | 98 | 88 |
| Children aged below 6 years | 25 | 12 | 13 |
| Scheduled caste | 0 | 0 | 0 |
| Scheduled tribe | 66 | 36 | 30 |
| Literates | 112 | 62 | 50 |
| Workers (all) | 86 | 45 | 41 |
| Main workers (total) | 59 | 31 | 28 |
| Main workers: Cultivators | 43 | 18 | 25 |
| Main workers: Agricultural labourers | 2 | 1 | 1 |
| Main workers: Household industry workers | 0 | 0 | 0 |
| Main workers: Other | 14 | 12 | 2 |
| Marginal workers (total) | 27 | 14 | 13 |
| Marginal workers: Cultivators | 3 | 1 | 2 |
| Marginal workers: Agricultural labourers | 0 | 0 | 0 |
| Marginal workers: Household industry workers | 0 | 0 | 0 |
| Marginal workers: Others | 24 | 13 | 11 |
| Non-workers | 100 | 53 | 47 |
