= Anhe (disambiguation) =

Anhe is a village in the Thane district of Maharashtra, India.

Anhe may also refer to:

- Anhe Palace
- Anhe Road
  - Xinyi Anhe metro station, a station of the Taipei Metro

== See also ==
- Anhe Ghore Da Daan
- Bei'anhe station
