= Thansit railway station =

Railway station in Thane district, India

Thansit

General information
- Coordinates: 19.550450°N 73.352187°E
- Elevation: 184.00 metres (603.67 ft)
- System: Indian Railways and Mumbai Suburban Railway station
- Owner: Ministry of Railways, Indian Railways
- Line: Central Line
- Platforms: 2

Construction
- Structure type: Standard on-ground station

Other information
- Status: Active
- Station code: THS
- Fare zone: Central Railways

History
- Opened: 15 February 2018

Services
Preceding station	Mumbai Suburban Railway	Following station
Atgaon towards Chhatrapati Shivaji Terminus	Central line	Khardi towards Kasara
Route map
Location
- Location within Maharashtra

Thansit railway station (station code: THS) is a railway station on the Central line of the Mumbai Suburban Railway network. It comes under Lahe village of Shahapur taluka of Thane District in Maharashtra. Atgaon is the previous stop and Khardi is the next stop.

== Background ==
Thansit railway station was the first cabin station in Mumbai Division of Central Railway, and was originally used only for operational halt of trains due to longer distance between Atgaon and Khardi stations. The people demanded it be converted into an official station, to give benefits to nearby villages around the station. It was declared as an official railway station on 15 February 2018.
