= Bill James (disambiguation) =

Bill James (born 1949) is an American baseball writer.

Bill James may also refer to:

- Bill James (pitcher, born 1887) (1887–1942), American baseball player
- Bill James (pitcher, born 1892) (1892–1971), American baseball player
- Bill James (American football) (1897–1969), American college football player and coach
- Bill James (rower) (1926–2001), New Zealand rower
- Bill James (novelist) (1929–2023), Welsh novelist
- Bill James (politician) (1930–2022), American politician
- Bill James (footballer) (born 1937), Australian rules footballer

== See also ==
- Billy James (disambiguation)
- William James (disambiguation)
- Will James (disambiguation)
