= Khardi railway station =

Railway station in Maharashtra, India

Khardi
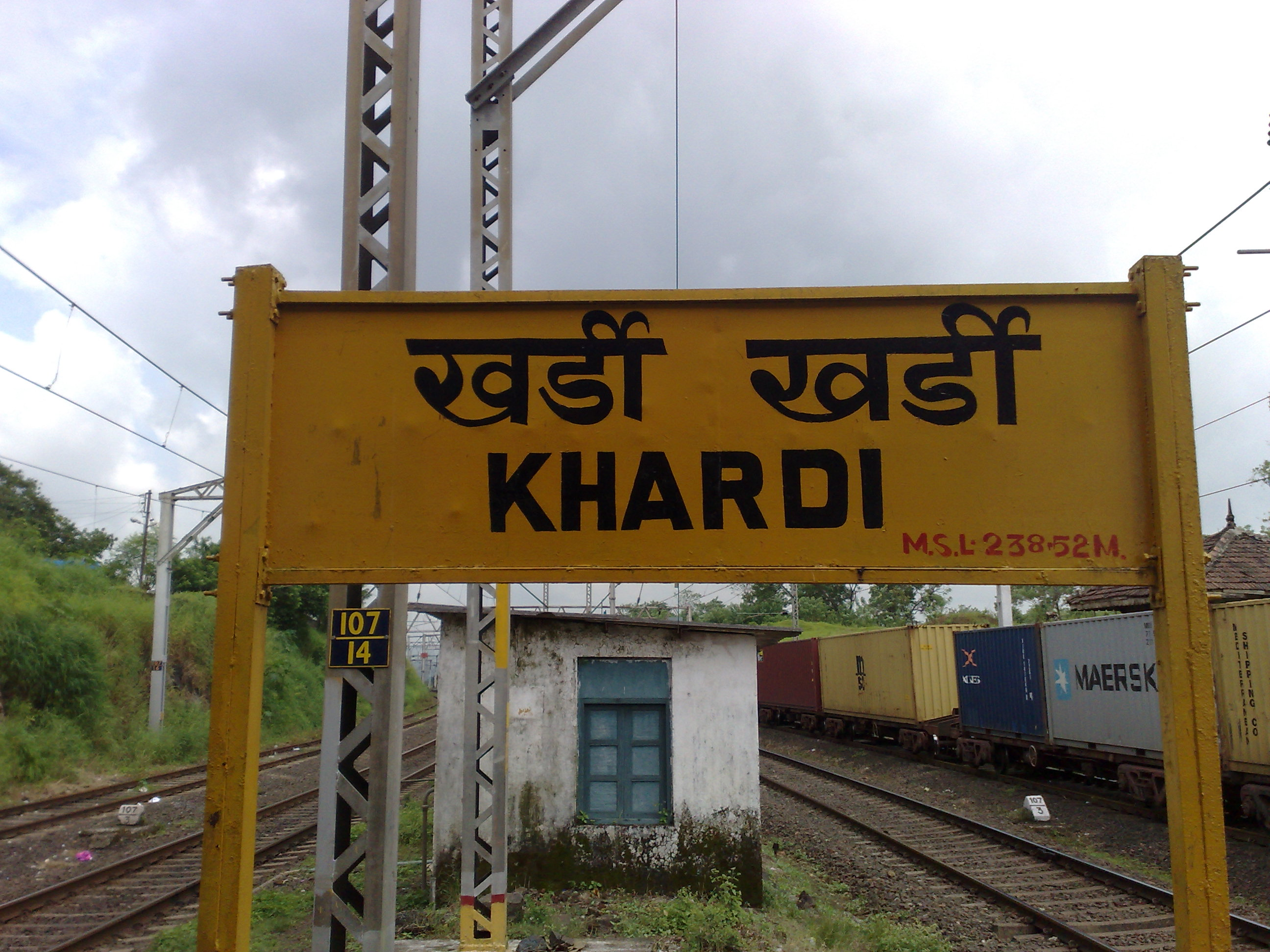

General information
- Coordinates: 19.580529°N 73.394186°E
- Elevation: 238.520 metres (782.55 ft)
- System: Indian Railways and Mumbai Suburban Railway station
- Owner: Ministry of Railways, Indian Railways
- Line: Central Line
- Platforms: 2
- Tracks: 4

Construction
- Structure type: Standard on-ground station
- Parking: No
- Cycle facilities: No

Other information
- Status: Active
- Station code: KE
- Fare zone: Central Railways

History
- Opened: 1861

Services
Preceding station	Mumbai Suburban Railway	Following station
Thansit towards Chhatrapati Shivaji Terminus	Central line	Umbermali towards Kasara
Route map
Location
- Location within India Location within Maharashtra

Khardi (station code: KE) is a railway station on the Central line of the Mumbai Suburban Railway network. The station has two platforms.

Thansit is the previous stop and Umbermali is the next stop. All suburban services terminating at, and departing from, Kasara, halt at this station.

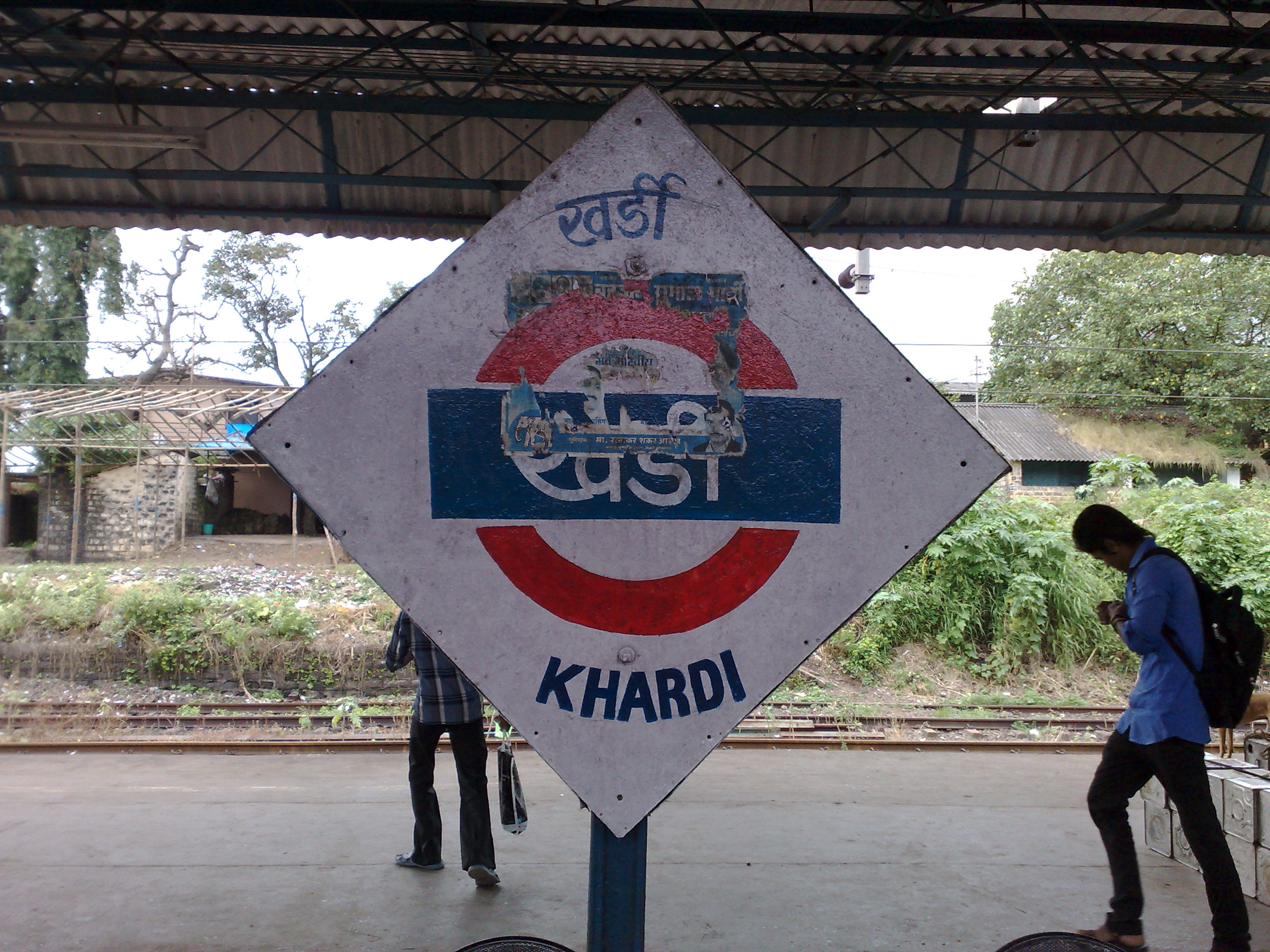
Khardi railway station - Platform board

Express highway, near the station, has been developed in 2024.
