= Pundhe =

Village in Maharashtra

Coordinates: 19.4910°N 73.3277°E

Pundhe is a small village in Shahapur taluka of Thane district, Maharashtra, India. It is situated on Mumbai Nashik Express Way. It is a Historical Place having Pandav Leni. Pundhe is also an Industrial complex. Atgaon Is nearest (2 km) railway station of central railway. Pundhe is 5 km far from Shahapur and 6 km far from Asangaon railway station. its Postal Index Number is 421601.
