= Anhe =

Village in Maharashtra

- village
- Location in Maharashtra, India Anhe (India)
- Coordinates: 19.3591127°N 73.2002291°E
- Country: India
- State: Maharashtra
- District: Thane
- Taluka: Bhiwandi
- Elevation: 19 m (62 ft)

Population (2011)
  - Total: 680
- Time zone: UTC+5:30 (IST)
- 2011 census code: 552621

Anhe is a village in the Thane district of Maharashtra, India. It is located in the Bhiwandi taluka. Khadavli is the nearest railway station.

== Demographics ==
According to the 2011 census of India, Anhe has 150 households. The effective literacy rate (i.e. the literacy rate of population excluding children aged 6 and below) is 79.56%.

Demographics (2011 Census)
| | Total | Male | Female |
|---|---|---|---|
| Population | 680 | 336 | 344 |
| Children aged below 6 years | 83 | 43 | 40 |
| Scheduled caste | 20 | 9 | 11 |
| Scheduled tribe | 153 | 77 | 76 |
| Literates | 475 | 249 | 226 |
| Workers (all) | 262 | 184 | 78 |
| Main workers (total) | 239 | 172 | 67 |
| Main workers: Cultivators | 70 | 56 | 14 |
| Main workers: Agricultural labourers | 107 | 63 | 44 |
| Main workers: Household industry workers | 0 | 0 | 0 |
| Main workers: Other | 62 | 53 | 9 |
| Marginal workers (total) | 23 | 12 | 11 |
| Marginal workers: Cultivators | 6 | 2 | 4 |
| Marginal workers: Agricultural labourers | 5 | 1 | 4 |
| Marginal workers: Household industry workers | 0 | 0 | 0 |
| Marginal workers: Others | 12 | 9 | 3 |
| Non-workers | 418 | 152 | 266 |
