= Khadavli railway station =

Railway Station in Maharashtra, India

Khadavli
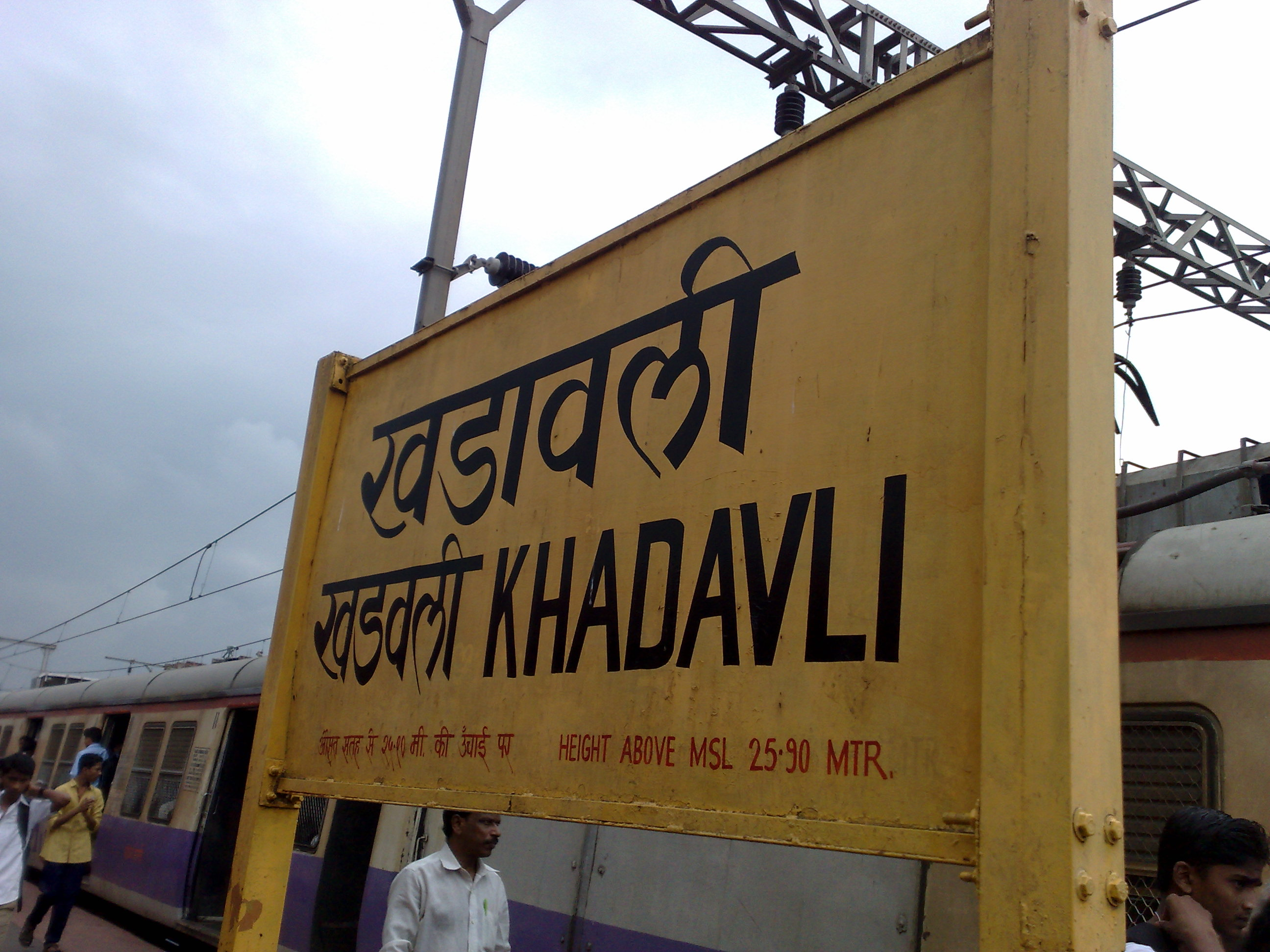

General information
- Coordinates: 19.356749°N 73.218879°E
- Elevation: 25.900 metres (84.97 ft)
- System: Indian Railways and Mumbai Suburban Railway station
- Owner: Ministry of Railways, Indian Railways
- Line: Central Line
- Platforms: 2
- Tracks: 2

Other information
- Status: Active
- Station code: KDV
- Fare zone: Central Railways

Services
Preceding station	Mumbai Suburban Railway	Following station
Titwala towards Chhatrapati Shivaji Terminus	Central line	Vasind towards Kasara
Route map
Location
- Location within India Location within Maharashtra

Khadavli (station code: KDV) is a railway station on the Central Line of the Mumbai Suburban Railway network. Titwala is the previous stop and Vasind is the next stop.

The station is situated in Khadavli village.

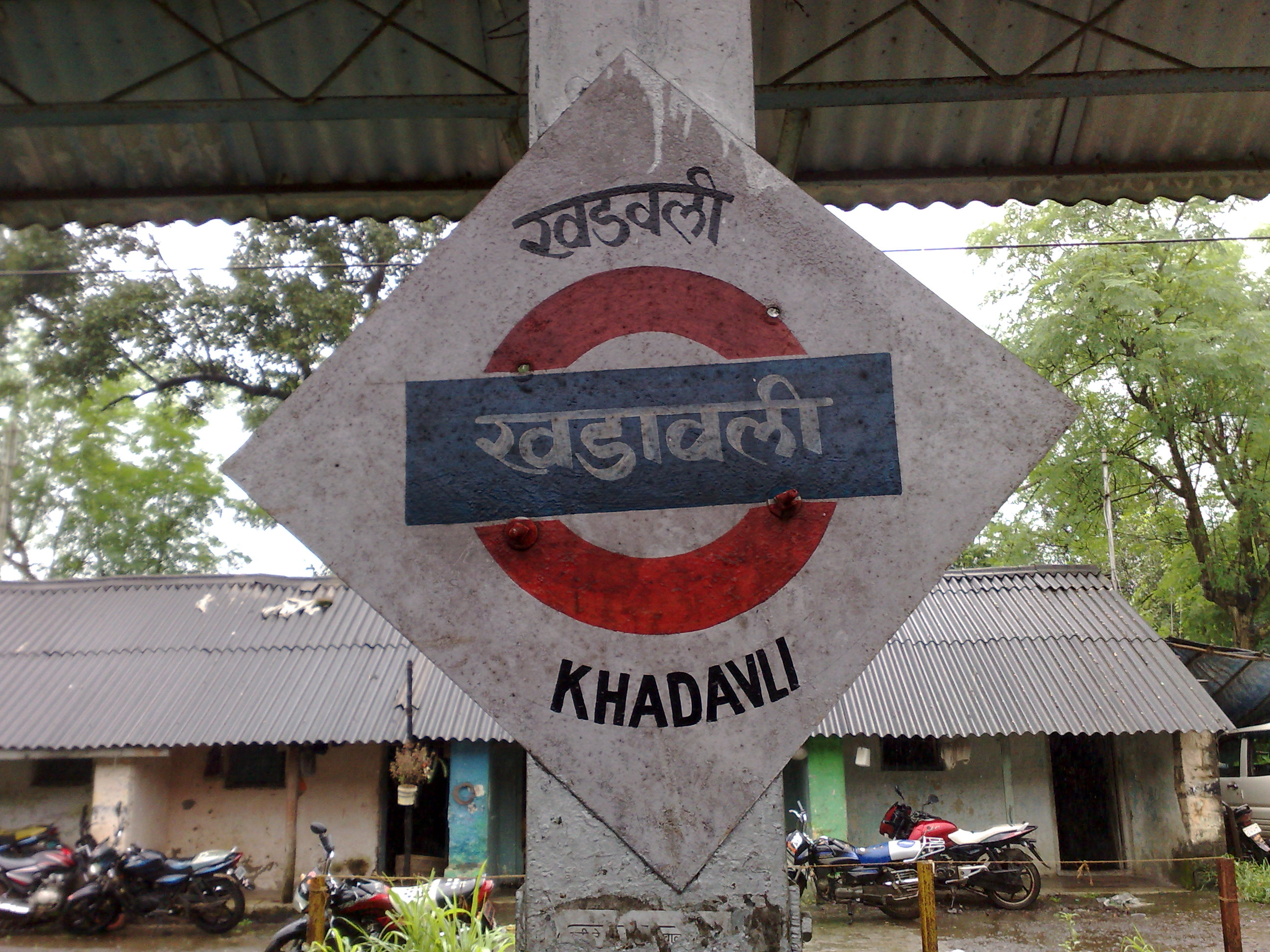
Khadavli railway station - Platformboard
