= William James (engineer) =

British construction overseer in India (1854–1889)

William James (15 November 1854 – 16 February 1889) was a British engineer, who worked in India.

William James was son of Edward James, J.P., of Greenbank House, Plymouth. He was educated at the nearby private school of Dr. P. Holmes, of Mannamead. From 1872, he served a pupilage of three years to S. W. Jenkin, during which he was engaged in connection with the parliamentary and working plans and sections of several branch lines for the Cornwall Minerals Railway, the Fal Valley Railway and the Truro and Penzance Railway. For one year from 1875 to 1876, he was a student at the School of Practical Engineering at Crystal Palace under W. J. Wilson. In 1876 he went to India, however, failing to obtain employment as an engineer, he became a pupil of H. Whymper, of the Murree Brewery, and was occupied for fifteen months on the water supply for the Murree Brewery Company in the Punjab.

Subsequently, he proceeded to Calcutta, where he was engaged by Mitchell and Co., engineers and contractors, of which he became a partner in 1881. He was first employed in building bungalows, machine-shops, engine-sheds for the Northern Bengal State Railway at Saidpore, and afterwards, during the year 1879, was in charge of the construction of 10 miles of the Darjeeling Steam Tramway. He was also concerned in the making of a road through the Teesta Valley and on the Bengal Central Railway, the Calcutta drainage works, the Dacca and Mymensingh Railway, and the Patna and Bankipore Tramway.

During the last two years of his life he was the resident partner in the firm of Walsh, Lovett, Mitchell and Co., contractors for the Tansa water-works, for bringing a large supply of good water to the City of Bombay. During this time he had in the working season from six thousand to ten thousand men under his charge, but the anxiety arising from his responsibilities acting on a frame already much weakened by jungle fever, was too much for him, and he died somewhat suddenly from heat apoplexy at Vasind on 16 February 1889, in his thirty-fifth year.
