= Asangaon railway station =

Railway station of the Mumbai Suburban Railway

Asangaon
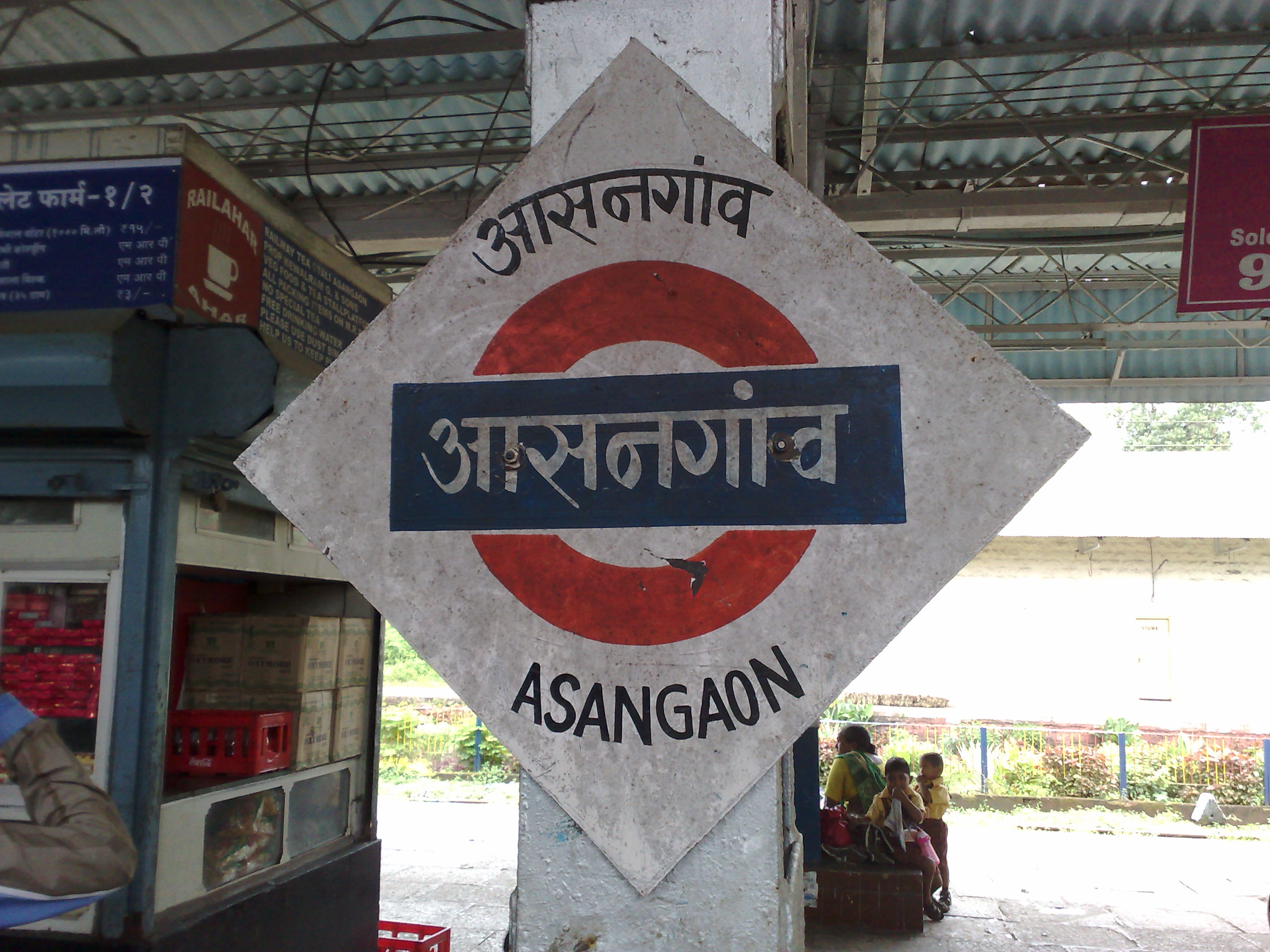

General information
- Coordinates: 19°26′27.08″N 73°18′11.1″E
- Elevation: 75.540 metres (247.83 ft)
- System: Indian Railways and Mumbai Suburban Railway station
- Owner: Ministry of Railways, Indian Railways
- Line: Central Line

Other information
- Status: Active
- Station code: ASO
- Fare zone: Central Railways

History
- Opened: 23 January 1860

Services
Preceding station	Mumbai Suburban Railway	Following station
Vasind towards Chhatrapati Shivaji Terminus	Central line	Atgaon towards Kasara
Route map
Location
- Location within India Location within Maharashtra

Asangaon (station code: ASO) is a railway station on the Central line of the Mumbai Suburban Railway network in the Mumbai division of the Central Railway. It is also now a green station. It is the only railway station which serves Shahapur city.

In March 2018, the Asangaon Railway station was declared fully Green powered station as it gets sufficient power from the windmills and solar panels.

Around two lakh commuters travel from Asangaon daily.

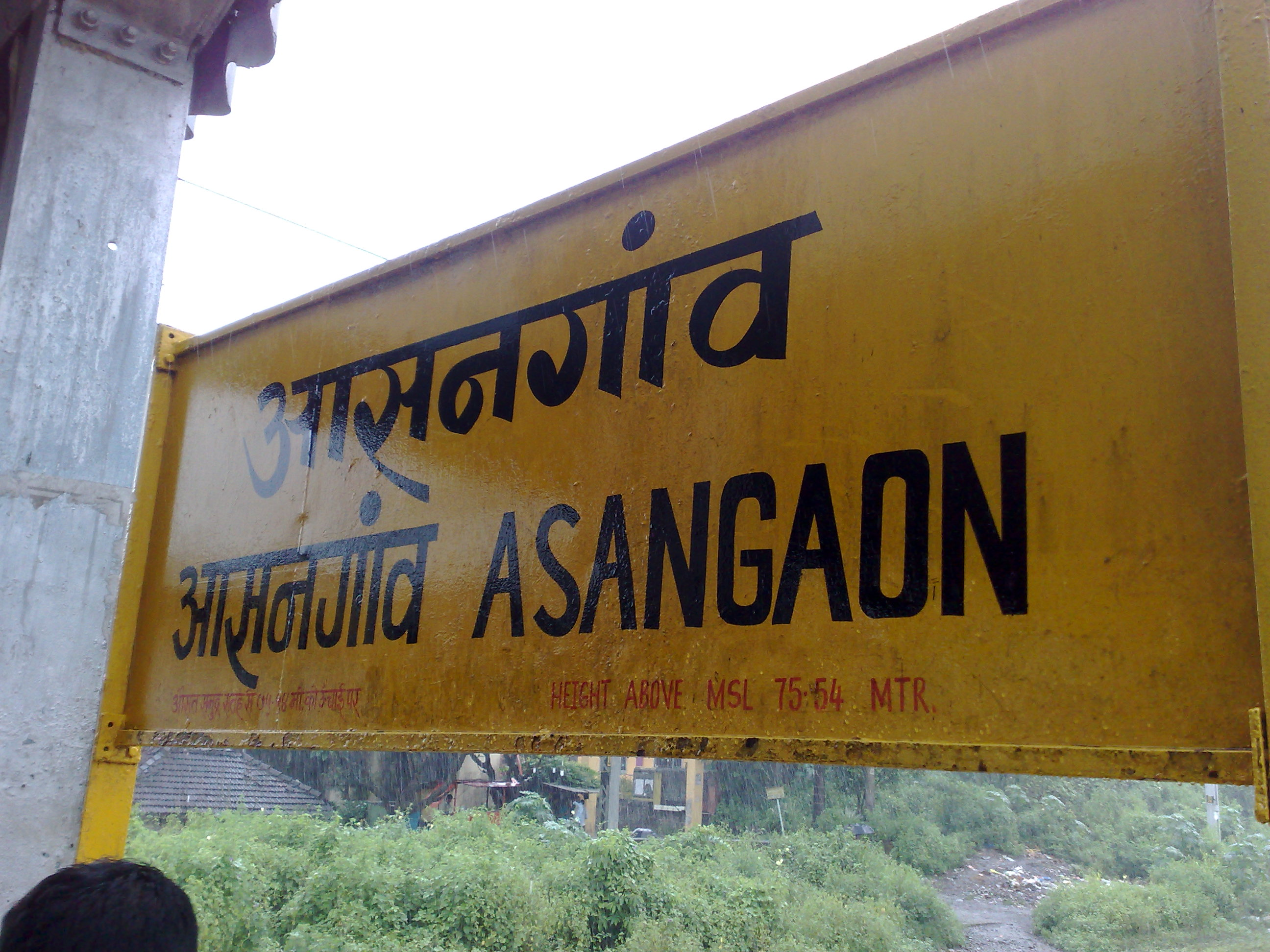
Station Board of Asangaon railway station
