= Atgaon =

Village in Maharashtra

- Village
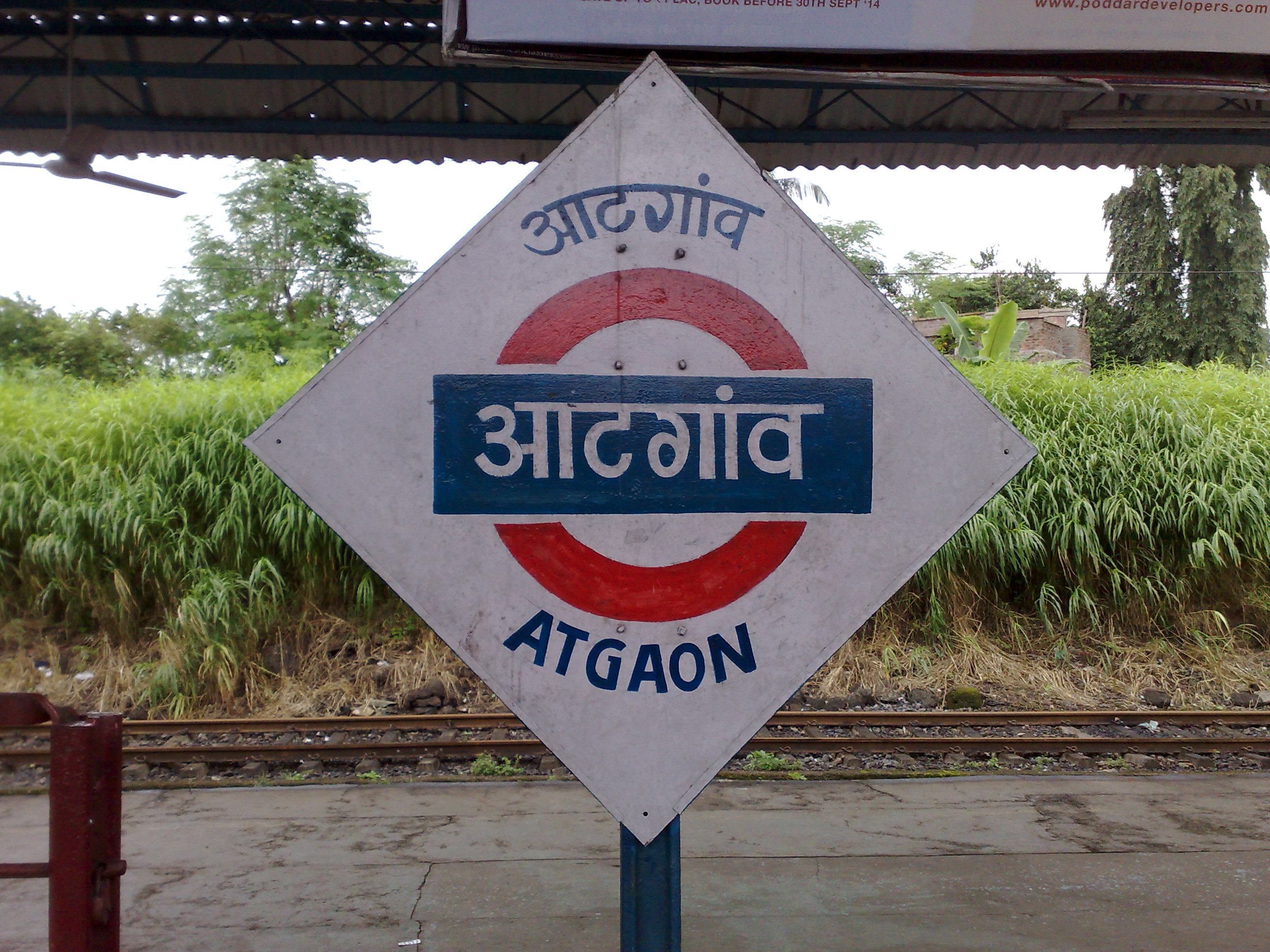
- Atgaon railway station - Platform board
- Interactive map of Atgaon
- Country: India
- State: Maharashtra

Atgaon is a small village in Thane district, Maharashtra state in Western India. The 2011 Census of India recorded a total of 591 residents in the village. Atgaon's geographical area is 209 hectares (520 acres). Atgaon Railway Station is the nearest railway station and lies on the Central line of the Mumbai Suburban Network of Railways.
