= Umbermali railway station =

Railway Station in Maharashtra, India

Umbermali Oombermali

General information
- Coordinates: 19.628339°N 73.422952°E
- Elevation: 248.000 metres (813.648 ft)
- System: Indian Railways and Mumbai Suburban Railway station
- Owner: Ministry of Railways, Indian Railways
- Line: Central Line
- Platforms: 2

Construction
- Structure type: Standard on-ground station

Other information
- Status: Active
- Station code: OMB
- Fare zone: Central Railways

History
- Opened: 15 February 2018

Services
Preceding station	Mumbai Suburban Railway	Following station
Khardi towards Chhatrapati Shivaji Terminus	Central line	Kasara Terminus
Route map
Location
- Location within Maharashtra

Umbermali (formerly known as Oombermali, station code: OMB) is a railway station on the Central line of the Mumbai Suburban Railway network.

It comes under Shirol village of Shahapur taluka of Thane District in Maharashtra. Khardi is the previous stop and Kasara is the next stop.

== Background ==
Umbermali railway station was the second cabin station in Mumbai Division of Central Railway, and was originally used only for operational halt of trains due to longer distance between Khardi and Kasara stations. The people demanded it be converted into an official station, to give benefits to nearby villages around the station. It was declared as an official railway station on 15 February 2018.
