= Jim Williams (author) =

British lawyer and author (born 1947)

- Born: 1947 (age 78–79); Oldham, Lancashire, England
- Occupations: Author, ex-lawyer, commercial consultant
- Writing career
- Pen name: Richard Hugo, Alexander Mollin
- Language: English
- Genres: Crime, Thrillers, Historical romance, Science Fantasy, Non-fiction
- Website: jimwilliamsbooks.com

Jim Williams (born 1947) is the name of the British lawyer, commercial consultant and writer, who has also written under the pen names Richard Hugo (not to be confused with an American author of the same name) and Alexander Mollin.

Born and brought up in Oldham, Lancashire, England, Williams graduated with a BA Hons in Law and Sociology at Durham University, was called to the bar in 1970. He practised law for a number of years before changing to a career of legal and commercial work in the construction industry. He is married with three children.

== Writing career ==
Williams came to public attention when his first novel, The Hitler Diaries, was published nine months before the famous Hitler Diaries forgery scandal, and he seemed again prophetic when Farewell to Russia, a novel about a nuclear accident in the USSR, was completed four months before the Chernobyl Disaster. Lara's Child was the subject of an international literary scandal in 1994 because its subject was a sequel to Doctor Zhivago.

Scherzo was nominated for the Booker Prize. Frances Fyfield called it "Sparkling and utterly charming". How to be a Charlatan is winner of the IAC Prize and was commended by Nick Webb (author of A Dictionary of Bullshit) as "Appalling and immoral. How wonderful!"

Jim Williams' books have received positive reviews in The Times Literary Supplement, The Guardian and The Evening Standard.

Jim Williams has been translated into six languages.

Williams uses the pen name Richard Hugo when writing Thrillers and Alexander Mollin when writing Historical romance.

== Bibliography ==
=== Jim Williams - Novels ===
==== Thrillers ====
- Jim Williams (2017). American Values (1st ed.). Marble City Publishing. ISBN 978-1908943859. Archived from the original on 16 November 2019.
- Jim Williams (2014). Anti-Soviet Activities: A Pyotr Kirov Detective Novel (1st ed.). Marble City Publishing. ISBN 978-1908943583. Archived from the original on 16 November 2019.
- Jim Williams (2014). Farewell to Russia: A Pyotr Kirov Detective Novel (1st ed.). Marble City Publishing. ISBN 978-1908943552. Archived from the original on 16 November 2019.
- Jim Williams (2013). The Hitler Diaries - A Spy Thriller (1st ed.). Marble City Publishing. ISBN 978-1908943200. Archived from the original on 16 November 2019.

==== Murder Mystery ====
- Jim Williams (2009). The Argentinian Virgin (1st ed.). Quartet Books. ISBN 978-0-7043-7180-4. Archived from the original on 16 November 2019.
  - Jim Williams (2014). The Argentinian Virgin by Jim Williams (2nd ed.). Marble City Publishing. Archived from the original on 16 November 2019.
- Jim Williams (2014). Tango in Madeira (1td ed.). Marble City Publishing. ISBN 978-1908943163. Archived from the original on 16 November 2019.
- Jim Williams (2011). The English Lady Murderers' Society (1st ed.). Quartet Books. ISBN 978-0-7043-7251-1. Archived from the original on 16 November 2019.
- Jim Williams (1998). Scherzo: A Venetian Entertainment (1st ed.). Touchstone Books. ISBN 978-0-684-81996-9. Archived from the original on 16 November 2019. (Nominated for the Booker Prize)
  - Jim Williams (2014). Scherzo: A Venetian Entertainment (2nd ed.). Scribner. ISBN 978-0-684-84012-3. Archived from the original on 16 November 2019.
    - Jim Williams (2013). Scherzo: Murder and Mystery in 18th Century Venice. Marble City Publishig. ISBN 978-1908943316. Archived from the original on 16 November 2019.
- Jim Williams (2001). The Strange Death of a Romantic (1st ed.). Scribner. ISBN 978-0-7432-0838-3. Archived from the original on 16 November 2019.
  - Jim Williams (2002). The Strange Death of a Romantic (2nd ed.). Scribner. ISBN 978-0-7432-0839-0. Archived from the original on 16 November 2019.
    - Jim Williams (2014). The Strange Death of a Romantic. Marble City Publishing. Archived from the original on 16 November 2019.
- Jim Williams (1999). Recherché: A Tale of Memories and Murder (1st ed.). Simon & Schuster. ISBN 978-0-684-86039-8.
  - Jim Williams (2001). Recherché: A Tale of Memories and Murder (2nd ed.). Scribner, Simon & Schuster. ISBN 978-0-684-86040-4.
    - Jim Williams (2014). Recherché: A Tale of Memories and Murder. Marble City Publishing.

==== Historical Romance ====
- Jim Williams (2014). Irina's Story (1st ed.). Marble City Publishing. ISBN 978-1908943781. Archived from the original on 16 November 2019.

==== Science Fantasy ====
- Jim Williams (2014). The Sadness of Angels (1st ed.). Marble City Publishing. ISBN 978-1908943491. Archived from the original on 16 November 2019.

=== Jim Williams - Non-fiction ===
- Jim Williams (2008). How to be a Charlatan and Make Millions (1st ed.). Authors OnLine. ISBN 978-0-7552-1098-5. Archived from the original on 25 November 2009. (Winner of the IAC Prize)
- Jim Williams (2007). A Message to the Children (1st ed.). Authors OnLine. ISBN 978-0-7552-1065-7. Archived from the original on 13 July 2011.

=== Alexander Mollin - Novels ===
- Alexander Mollin (1994). Lara's Child. Doubleday. ISBN 978-0-385-40379-5.

=== Richard Hugo - Novels ===
- Richard Hugo (1989). Conspiracy of Mirrors. Macmillan. ISBN 978-0-333-49263-5.
  - Richard Hugo (1989). The Gorbachev Version. Zebra Books. ISBN 978-0-8217-3288-5.
    - Richard Hugo (1990). Conspiracy of Mirrors. Pan Books. ISBN 978-0-330-31241-7.
- Richard Hugo (1987). Farewell to Russia. Macmillan. ISBN 978-0-333-43205-1.
  - Richard Hugo (1988). Farewell to Russia. Sphere Books. ISBN 978-0-7474-0061-5.
    - Richard Hugo (1989). Farewell to Russia. Pinnacle Books. ISBN 978-1-55817-165-7.
- Richard Hugo (1984). Last Judgment. Macmillan. ISBN 978-0-333-37612-6.
- Richard Hugo (1982). The Hitler Diaries. Macmillan. ISBN 978-0-333-33620-5.
