= James H. Williams Jr. =

American engineer

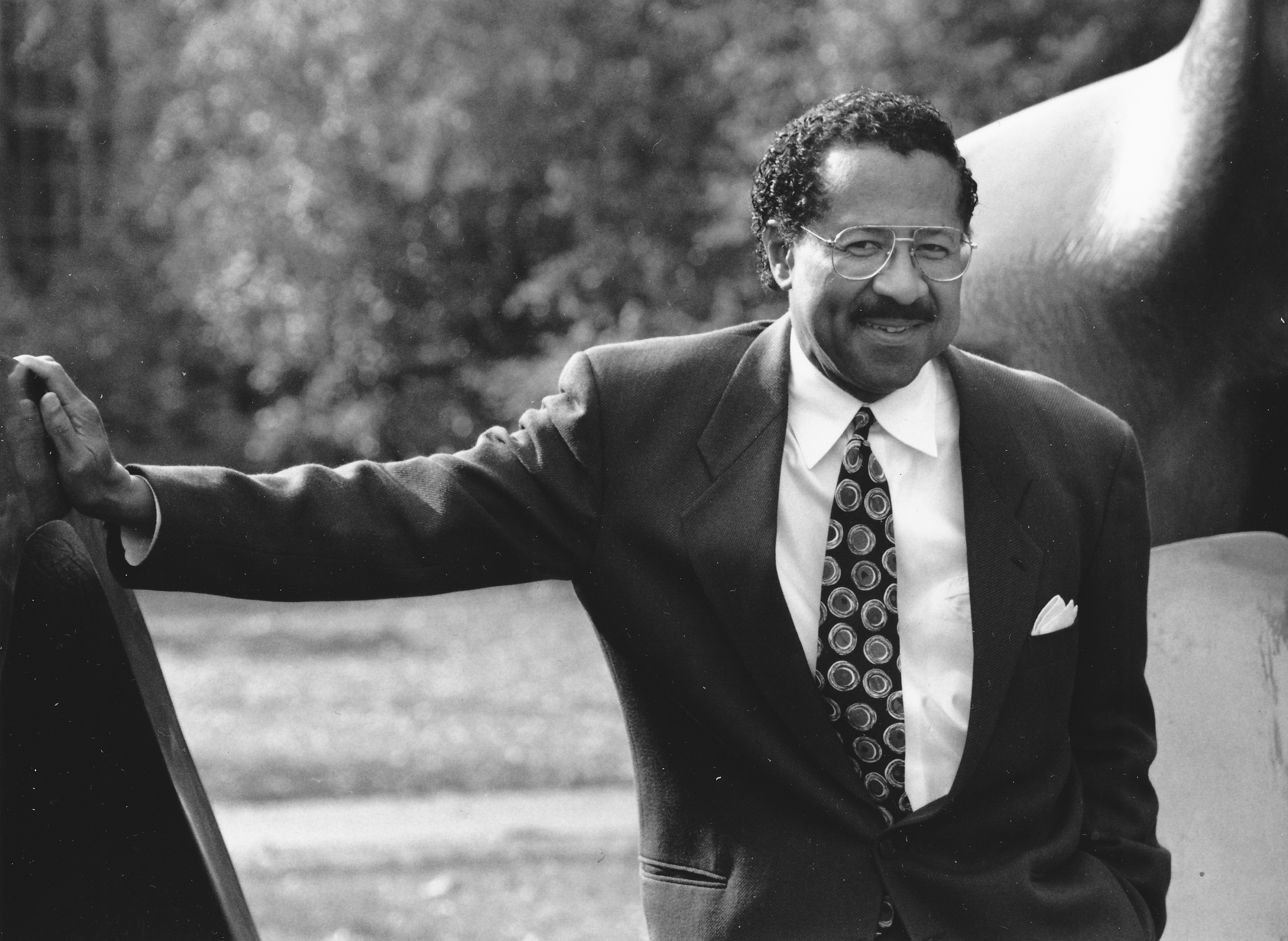
Professor James H. Williams Jr., Du Pont Court, Massachusetts Institute of Technology, Cambridge, Massachusetts USA, November 2000.

James Henry Williams Jr. is a mechanical engineer, consultant, civic commentator, and teacher of engineering. He is currently Professor of Applied Mechanics in the Mechanical Engineering Department at the Massachusetts Institute of Technology (MIT). He is regarded as one of the world's leading experts in the mechanics, design, fabrication, and nondestructive evaluation (NDE) of nonmetallic fiber reinforced composite materials and structures. He is also Professor of Writing and Humanistic Studies at MIT.

Williams began his career in 1960 as an apprentice machinist at the Newport News Shipbuilding and Dry Dock Company. Within eight years he graduated from The Apprentice School, earned SB and SM engineering degrees from MIT, and returned to the Shipyard as a senior design engineer. Within another two years, he earned a PhD from the University of Cambridge, where he conducted theoretical elasticity and shell theory. He then chose to join the faculty at MIT, where he has spent the bulk of his career.

== Early life, education, and industrial career ==
Williams was born in Newport News, Virginia, where he attended the segregated public schools. He was a rambunctious, "hell-raising" student who never took a textbook home. Still, Williams's brilliance was recognized by some of his teachers who permitted him to read whatever he chose while in school and devised especially difficult tests for him, independent of his classmates. Along with one or more of his teachers, he would also occasionally make up and grade the quizzes of his classmates. He went on to win statewide prizes in mathematics and science. He was also featured as a flutist in his high school band, and as an underclassman earned first chair in the all-state concert band.

In 1960, Williams was among the earliest African-Americans admitted to the selective Newport News Shipyard Apprentice School. It attracts an average of about 4500 applications per year for approximately 250 openings, with some of the applicants having earned bachelor's degrees. Williams is often regarded as the top academic student in the century-long history of the Apprentice School. In 1961 he won the Charles F. Bailey Bronze Medal (for the highest academic record by a first-year apprentice); in 1962, the Charles F. Bailey Silver Medal (highest academic record by a second-year apprentice); and, in 1963, the Charles F. Bailey Gold Medal (highest academic record by a third-year apprentice). Furthermore, in 1963 the Shipyard chose to award him a four-year full Homer L. Ferguson Scholarship to MIT. Throughout his years as a student at MIT, he consistently returned to the Shipyard during vacations and summers.

In 1965, the Apprentice School awarded Williams the five-year diploma of Mechanical Designer. In 1967, he graduated from MIT with an SB in mechanical engineering, and after completing his SM in mechanical engineering in the winter of 1968, Williams returned to the Shipyard. During that period, he performed a range of mechanics calculations on the catapults, arrester cables, and power and propulsion systems of the nuclear-powered aircraft carrier USS Nimitz (CVN-68). During this same period, he held the title of Senior Design Engineer and was the only black among the hundreds of engineers at the Shipyard. In the fall of 1968, Williams entered the University of Cambridge (Trinity College) in England, earned the PhD in engineering, and returned to America to the mechanical engineering faculty of MIT in 1970.

== Teaching ==
Throughout his MIT career, Williams has been repeatedly acclaimed and honored with numerous awards. His teaching awards at MIT include:

- 1973: Everett Moore Baker Memorial Award for Excellence in Undergraduate Teaching (Top MIT teaching prize awarded solely by students; he was the first Mechanical Engineering professor to receive this award.)
- 1981: Jacob P. Den Hartog Distinguished Educator Award (Top teaching award in the Mechanical Engineering Department at MIT; he received the inaugural award.)
- 1991: School of Engineering Professor of Teaching Excellence (He was the inaugural occupant of this MIT chair.)
- 1993: MacVicar Faculty Fellow (Top MIT teaching prize awarded through MIT's executive administration for undergraduate education, requiring broad faculty and student endorsements; he was the first Mechanical Engineering professor to receive this award.)

Having served as the first Housemaster of MIT's undergraduate dormitory New West Campus Houses and having supervised dozens of research theses, Williams is a highly regarded mentor of both undergraduate and graduate students.

== The James H. Williams, Jr. (1968) Award ==
Trinity College, Cambridge University, in 2023 established The James H. Williams, Jr. (1968) Award, in perpetuity. In the ensuing annual celebrations, The James H. Williams, Jr. (1968) Research Colloquium has been held in which outstanding graduate students at Trinity College were invited to deliver presentations of their research. At the close of those proceedings, a jury consisting of Trinity faculty conferred two Awards: one to the student delivering the most outstanding presentation in Arts, Humanities or Social Sciences; the second to the student delivering the most outstanding presentation in Natural Sciences, Mathematics or Engineering. The criteria for the evaluations were a combination of the depth, innovation, and significance of the research; and the skill in successfully communicating each subject to a broad academic audience.

== Research ==
In the early 1970s, Williams sought to better understand the emerging carbon fiber reinforced polymeric composite materials, which were being touted as new materials to elevate the mechanical performance of structures. (Today, these materials are used in fighter and commercial aircraft, automobiles, ships, golf clubs, tennis racquets, and myriad other structures.) One of the major manufacturers of these new materials had observed that newly fabricated structures built from them had unacceptably high variabilities, resulting in structures of low reliability. Williams was retained as a consultant to determine why. In addition, Williams's efforts were recognized by both industry and the National Science Foundation and he was selected, through a university-industrial program, to spend the summer of 1974 at a major composites manufacturing facility.

Williams soon realized that the unpredictability of the materials' properties was due to undetected flaws or damage within the materials as a consequence of either improper fabrication or handling, as well as the selection of the various constituents. When he examined the technical and research literature on the nondestructive testing (NDT) to find and characterize the flaws in those materials, he found very little. Moreover, the NDT results that he found generally related to metals, and most of them were qualitative. Then, in 1974, Williams founded the Composite Materials and Nondestructive Evaluation Laboratory in MIT's Mechanical Engineering Department. (He preferred the term "nondestructive evaluation" to the more common term of "nondestructive testing" to emphasize his interests in the broad structural behavior of materials even in the absence of macroscopic flaws.)

With his facilities in applied mathematics and insights in mechanical design, Williams sought quantitative analyses and characterizations of composite materials' properties and residual life based on a combination of nondestructive measurements and theoretical mechanics. Such quantitative analyses and materials characterizations have elevated the field of nondestructive testing and increased the reliable use of composite materials and structures.

Williams has subsequently compiled an extensive list of research and consulting results—in several instances, groundbreaking "firsts"—in the design, fabrication, strength analysis, residual strength, fatigue life, and NDE of fiber reinforced composite materials and structures. As an industrial and governmental consultant and through his MIT Lab with his research students, he advanced the understanding of modern composite materials and structures, as well as the systems for experimentally testing them. Among many achievements, he (1) conducted the theoretical stress analyses of isotropic and anisotropic shells subjected to symmetric and asymmetric loads; (2) produced the first quantitative correlations for the solid-particle erosion of carbon fiber polymeric composites; (3) conducted the stress analyses of adhesively bonded joints in composites; (4) analyzed the enhancement of composite properties by the introduction of thermoplastic microstructures; (5) conducted the elastic and plastic acoustic emission monitoring of materials and structures, including structural bridge steels; (6) established the forefront of the quantitative thermographic analyses of composite materials and structures; (7) theoretically predicted and experimentally demonstrated the input-output signatures of ultrasonic transducers; (8) hypothesized and then produced the first ultrasonic wave–fatigue life correlations of as-fabricated composites; (9) hypothesized and then produced the first ultrasonic wave–residual strength correlations of impact-damaged composites; (10) performed theoretical and applied ultrasonics of metals with and without macroscopic cracks, including a focus on structural bridge steels; (11) performed theoretical and applied ultrasonics of composites; (12) conducted theoretical and experimental dynamic fracture of composite materials and structures; (13) performed theoretical analyses of wave propagation in anisotropic media as related to composite materials and structures; (14) developed statistical pattern recognition concepts for NDE; (15) devised strategies for the residual life prediction of composite aircraft structures; and (16) developed acoustic emission and ultrasonic versus load correlations for synthetic braided mooring lines and composite tension legs for offshore deepwater platforms.

For the decade up to 2012, he and his research students have focused on the structural integrity damage assessment and repair of modern composites, with an emphasis on naval structures; and he continues to write sole-author documents on a range of technical topics, including several of the areas mentioned above, mechanical vibration and shock mitigation, and biomimetics.

From the mid-1970s to the early 2000s, Williams also (1) conducted theoretical analyses on the earthquake isolation of buildings and structures by devising the highly unconventional concept of supporting them on sliding foundations; (2) developed wave-like analyses of the dynamics and control of large space structures for earth-orbiting structural systems; and (3) performed numerous major governmental and industrial consultations, as briefly described below.

By the early 1980s, he had devised ultrasonic laboratory systems for monitoring the structural integrity of composite structures in high performance aircraft. He is known for having produced "the first theoretical models that predicted the acousto–ultrasonic waveforms as actually observed" in experiments and practice, as conducted at NASA Lewis and elsewhere. Today, Williams is broadly recognized as one of the world's leading researchers in the mechanics and nondestructive testing of composite materials and structures: He was chosen by the editorial board of the American Society for Nondestructive Testing to be the first guest technical editor of its Special Focus issue on the NDT of Composites.

Williams has also shown a sense of humor; 1) he led a group of students in building the world's largest yo-yo and tested it from the tallest building in Cambridge, Massachusetts; (2) he has been called one of Boston's men of elegance and style; and (3) he derived a mathematical proof of the counterintuitive number of rotations made by a non-slipping smaller cylinder rolling around a larger stationary cylinder, as presented in the popular "Ask Marilyn" column of the 72-year-old Parade Magazine, which is inserted into about 700 U.S. Sunday newspapers.

== Consulting ==
During his career, Williams has conducted dozens of industrial and governmental consultations including (1) papermaking calender rolls, for which "he is considered, by virtue of his extensive work in the field, to be the nation's leading expert on stresses in rotary paper dryers"; (2) the first automated system for installing recessed highway lane delineation reflectors; (3) an earthquake analysis of the 500 KV bus system of the British Columbia (Canada) hydroelectric power generating station and the design of an isolation system to protect its electrical lines during seismic activity; (4) the design of composite rocket motor casings; (5) the residual-life prediction of composite aircraft structures; (6) the stress analysis of a high-speed optical pulsing system; (7) the stress analysis of pelvic implants and bone stints for the Orthopædic Unit of the Massachusetts General Hospital; (8) the effect of ultrasonic irradiation on the enhancement of composite fabrication; (9) the ultrasonic NDE delineation of strength and rupture modes in adhesively bonded joints; (10) the design of deepwater mooring composite systems for offshore oil platforms; (11) an NDE regimen for the structural acceptance of composite automotive leaf springs; among others.

== Controversies ==
=== MIT fasting protest ===
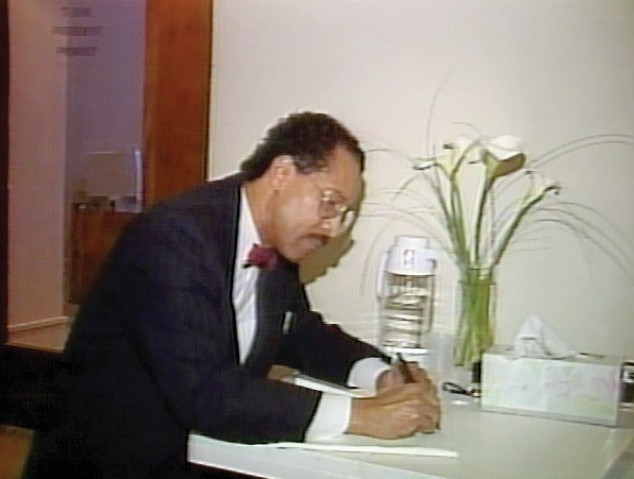
Professor James H. Williams Jr. sitting in protest in front of the Office of the MIT President and Provost, 3 April 1991.

In April 1991, Williams—at that time, the only native-born black American faculty member in the combined School of Engineering and School of Science at MIT—conducted a fasting sit-in each Wednesday throughout April. He was protesting the lack of black faculty and a lack of inspirational education for minority students. During his protest, he set up a temporary office in the corridor at the entrance of the offices of the MIT president and provost. He observed that some aspects of the black community have disproportionately suffered attendant with integration because, in the broadest sense, many talented blacks have left the black community (no matter where it exists)—they no longer live in or relate to it; "they have been encouraged to escape from their roots." The residual black community is less educated and financially poorer. He characterized this phenomenon as "neocolonialist."

=== Crash of American Airlines Flight 587 ===
On November 12, 2001, shortly after takeoff from John F. Kennedy International Airport, American Airlines Flight 587, an Airbus Industrie A300-600, crashed in Queens, New York, killing 251 passengers, a crew of 9, and 5 people on the ground.

At the request of several American Airlines pilots, Williams analyzed and then challenged the inspection requirements and the accident investigation conclusions of Airbus Industrie, the Federal Aviation Administration (FAA), and the National Transportation Safety Board (NTSB)—all of whom to varying degrees blamed the co-pilot of Flight 587 for the crash. The investigation and controversy concerning the crash focused on (1) the co-pilot's actions during takeoff, and (2) the aircraft's vertical stabilizer of the tail section, a complex structure of advanced composites. The vertical stabilizer on Flight 587 snapped off and landed in Jamaica Bay, away from the fuselage crash site.

According to Williams, Airbus adopted an inadequate inspection policy for its composite tail, the FAA approved Airbus's deficient inspection policy, and the NTSB mis-analyzed the cause of the airline disaster.

In so far as the vertical stabilizer was concerned, Airbus's nondestructive inspection policy was that damage that could not be seen with the unaided eye would not compromise its structural integrity. Such an inspection protocol greatly concerned Williams who characterized it as "a lamentably naive policy." Williams further stated and was frequently quoted in the print and broadcast media as describing Airbus's inspection policy as "analogous to assessing whether a woman has breast cancer by simply looking at her family portrait."

Through internet postings, op-ed pieces, industrial journal articles, letters, interviews in magazines and newspapers and TV appearances, Williams challenged the preliminary remarks and the final report of the NTSB's accident investigation. Although there were several critics of the investigation, including varied pilots and pundits, Williams is widely regarded as the major engineering voice providing pushback against the conclusion that the air disaster was essentially the fault of the co-pilot.

Based largely on the steadfast criticism of Airbus and the NTSB by Williams, in a tour de force of engineering and civic commentary, he clearly influenced both the NTSB and Airbus to reverse their positions on the cause of the American Airlines 587 crash as well as the required inspection procedures, thus likely saving hundreds of lives of current and future commercial airline passengers.

== Publications ==
Williams has written hundreds of technical publications in refereed journals, conference proceedings, and major reports to industrial and governmental agencies, dozens of non-technical op-ed and political commentaries, and two books. He is the author of the introductory textbook Wave Propagation and of the unconventional textbook Fundamentals of Applied Dynamics, which is a blend of history, dynamics and vibration.
