= Khadavli =

Town in Thane district, Maharashtra

Khadavli is a town in Thane district, Maharashtra. It is also a station on the Mumbai Suburban Railway system on the Central Line route between Bhiwandi and Kasara. Khadavli is known for a Datta mandir of Shri Satguru Swami Mayekar Maharaj in khadavli. This temple is located in the interior and has a "Trimukh Odumbar" tree in its premise. An Ashram of Shri Satguru swami Mayekar Maharaj is present besides the Batsa river. This place is popular with youngsters, who come to this river during any time of the year for swimming. A bridge was built across the river (this is actually an over flow of the Batsa Dam) in 2008 because the old bridge submerges during heavy rains. The nearest market place from the station on the east is Pagda. Transportation to Padga includes sharing rickshaws and State Transportation buses.

Khadavli river can be visited by road or railways. The river water flows continuously. The nearest village is called Sorgaon and is located between Khadavli river and Padgha. On the day of Rangpanchami, the young boys and males visit the river for having bath.

The local villagers have approached court to get a stay order over construction in and around Khadavli. The real estate growth has contributed in changing the face of Khadavli. It is affecting the eco-system and living of the locals. New buildings have cropped up, which is further straining and causing damage to the environment.

An old age home called "Matoshree Vridhashram" is also present near the river bank at Khadavli West.

Khadavli connects to Nashik Expressway and also connects to Murbad road at the other end via Ganapati temple at Titwala.
