= James Wilson Williams =

American writer and academic (born 1982)

- Born: 1982; Cape Canaveral, Florida
- Education: Balliol College, Oxford

James Wilson Williams (born 1982) is an American writer and academic. He was the winner of the inaugural Nine Dots Prize, in 2017. His first book, Stand Out of Our Light: Freedom and Resistance in the Attention Economy, was published in 2018 by Cambridge University Press. In 2019, Princeton University president Christopher Eisgruber selected the book as the Princeton Pre-read, the one book all incoming students were assigned to read before beginning their studies.
