= Jim Williams (news anchor) =

American journalist (born 1957)

Jim Williams (born February 4, 1957) is a weekday news anchor for WBBM-TV in Chicago.

== Early life and education ==
A native of Chicago's South Side, Williams graduated from Kenwood High School in Chicago's Hyde Park neighborhood. He earned a bachelor's degree in media management from Columbia College in Chicago.

== Professional career ==
Williams began his broadcasting career in 1977 as a part-time news film librarian at WGN-TV in Chicago. Over the years, he was promoted to be a writer, producer and eventually, a reporter at WGN-TV in Chicago. In 1988, he was formally promoted from a newswriter and program producer to being an on-air general-assignment reporter. In all, Williams spent 15 years at WGN before leaving the station for a job in city government in 1992.

From 1992 until 1997, Williams was the press secretary for Chicago Mayor Richard M. Daley, helping to create city government's first television magazine show, called "Chicago Works!" and also representing the city during the 1996 Democratic National Convention. In June 1997, Williams joined ABC News as a Chicago-based correspondent.

In 2000, Williams was a finalist to replace Lester Holt as a principal news anchor at WBBM-TV, according to a November 15, 2002 article in the Chicago Sun-Times.

Williams left ABC News in June 2001 as part of a companywide downsizing. In late 2001, Williams rejoined WGN-TV as a free-lance, per diem reporter. He remained in that position until 2002.

In December 2002, Williams joined WBBM-TV as a general assignment reporter. He became a weekend morning news anchor at WBBM in mid-2003. He became the station's weekend evening news anchor in January 2006. He briefly became a weekday morning news anchor in 2008, but in September 2008 returned to co-anchoring weekend evenings with Mai Martinez.

On December 16, 2021, WBBM-TV announced that Williams and Marie Saavedra will co-anchor their new 4 pm hour-long newscast which will debut on January 24, 2022.

== Personal ==
Williams is married to Joyce Williams and has a daughter, Christina.
