= William K. James =

United States Air Force senior officer (1935–2022)

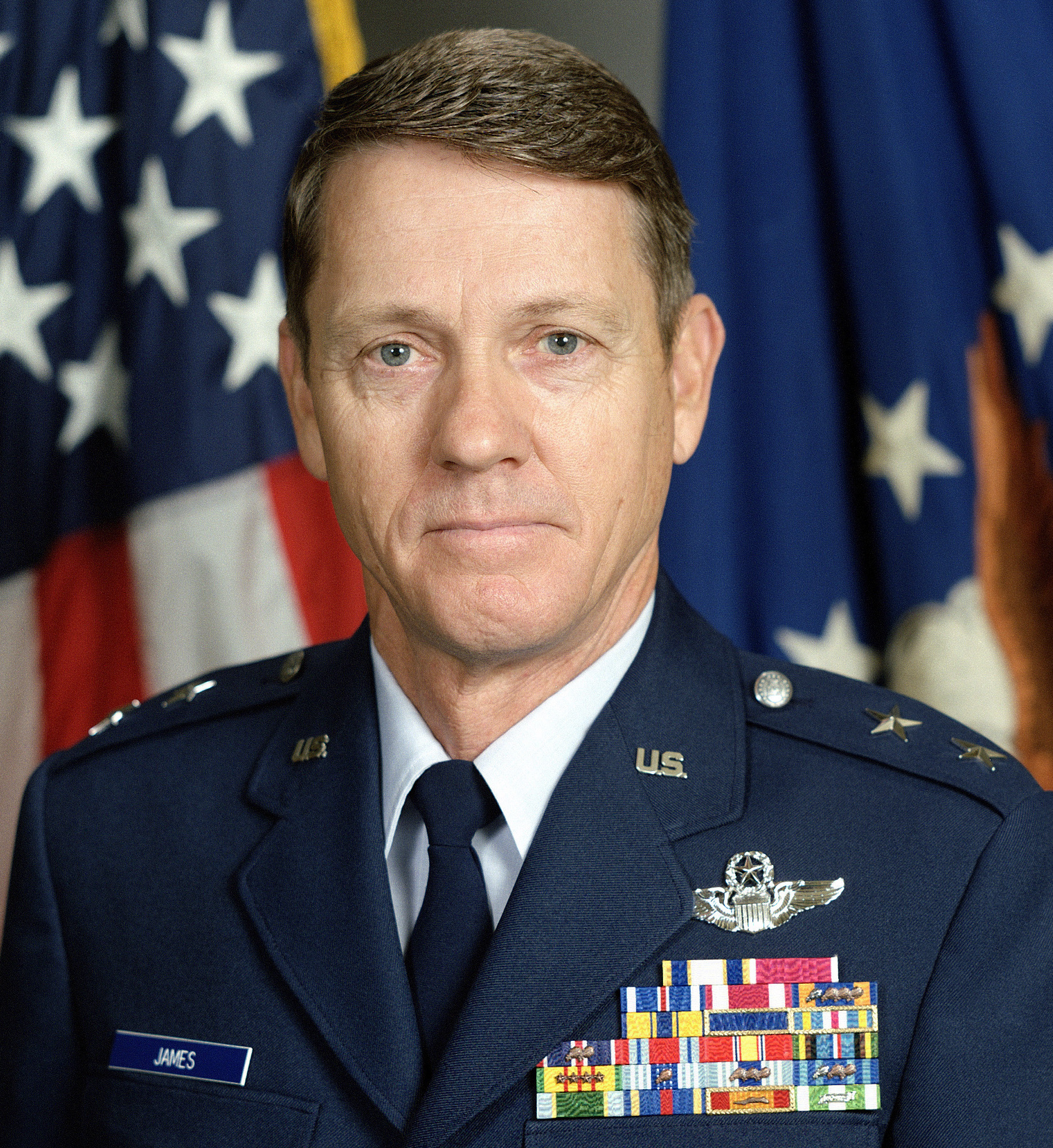
- Official portrait of Major General James
- Born: June 15, 1935; Hope, Arkansas, U.S.
- Died: January 13, 2022 (aged 86) Haymarket, Virginia, U.S.
- Buried: Arlington National Cemetery
- Allegiance: United States of America
- Branch: United States Air Force
- Service years: 1959 to 1993
- Rank: Major General
- Awards: Defense Distinguished Service Medal; Legion of Merit; Presidential Unit Citation; Air Force Outstanding Unit Award with two oak leaf clusters; National Defense Service Medal; Vietnam Service Medal with four service stars; Republic of Vietnam Gallantry Cross with Palm; Republic of Vietnam Campaign Medal

Major General William K. James (June 15, 1935 – January 13, 2022) of United States Air Force, was director of the Defense Mapping Agency (DMA) between June 1990 and June 1993. Under his leadership Major General James redirected the DMA – a heritage organization of the National Geospatial-Intelligence Agency – from producing products to meet the requirements of the Cold War to a concept of a Global Geospatial Information System (GGIS) directly accessible to combat commanders of the Rapid Deployment Forces. The GGIS was a major paradigm shift in warfare with the delivery of geographic information to fast-moving military forces.

James died in Haymarket, Virginia on January 13, 2022, at the age of 86.

== Career ==
Maj. Gen. William K. James earned a BS in geology from Southern Methodist University in 1958 and completed Squadron Officer School in 1964, Armed Forces Staff College in 1973, and Air War College in 1978. Commissioned into the U.S. Air Force through the Reserve Officers Training Corps program, Major General James received his pilot wings in July 1959.

James spent six years as an instructor pilot, officer training instructor, and flight examiner at Greenville Air Force Base (AFB) and Moody AFB, Georgia, before being assigned to the 48th Tactical Fighter Wing, RAF Lakenheath, England, and then to the 3rd Tactical Fighter Wing, Bien Hoa Air Base, Vietnam. In December 1969 he was assigned to the 474th Tactical Fighter Wing at Nellis AFB, Nevada, as flight commander, squadron weapons officer, squadron chief of training and scheduling, and standardization-evaluation flight examiner.

After serving at Headquarters Allied Forces Central Europe, Brunssum, Netherlands, in the Plans Division, Nuclear Operations Branch, Major General James became commander of the 55th Tactical Fighter Squadron, 20th Tactical Fighter Wing, at Royal Air Force Station Upper Heyford, England. In May 1978 he was assigned as chief of the Plans, Operations, and Readiness Division, Air Directorate, National Guard Bureau, Washington, DC.

James served as vice commander and then wing commander of the 27th Tactical Fighter Wing at Cannon AFB, New Mexico; commander of the 552d Airborne Warning and Control Wing, Tinker AFB, Oklahoma; commander of the 552d Airborne Warning and Control Division; and commander of the newly activated 28th Air Division. In September 1986 he reported to Royal Air Force Station Mildenhall, England, as commander of 3rd Air Force and later served as deputy chief of staff for operations, Headquarters Tactical Air Command, Langley AFB, Virginia. He served as deputy commander in chief for U.S. Southern Command, Panama. He took charge as director of the Defense Mapping Agency in June 1990. He retired on July 1, 1993.

== Accolades ==
Major General James was a command pilot with almost 6,500 flying hours and 180 combat missions in Vietnam. His awards and decorations include:

- Defense Distinguished Service Medal
- Legion of Merit
- Distinguished Flying Cross
- Meritorious Service Medal
- Air Medal with eight oak leaf clusters
- Air Force Commendation Medal
- Presidential Unit Citation
- Air Force Outstanding Unit Award with two oak leaf clusters
- Combat Readiness Medal
- National Defense Service Medal
- Vietnam Service Medal with four service stars
- Air Force Longevity Service Award Ribbon with five oak leaf clusters
- Small Arms Expert Marksmanship Ribbon
- Republic of Vietnam Gallantry Cross with Palm
- Republic of Vietnam Campaign Medal
- Armed Forces Expeditionary Medal
