= Jimmy Williams (footballer, born 1882) =

English footballer

Personal information
- Full name: James Williams
- Date of birth: 8 June 1882
- Place of birth: Brownhills, England
- Date of death: 1960 (aged 77–78)
- Position: Full back

Senior career*
Years	Team	Apps	(Gls)
1901–1902	Lichfield		
1902–1903	Brownhills Albion		
1903–1904	Aston Villa	0	(0)
1904–1908	West Bromwich Albion	31	(1)
1909	Brownhills Albion		
Total		31	(1)
- * Club domestic league appearances and goals

James Williams (8 June 1882–1960) was an English footballer who played in the Football League for West Bromwich Albion.
