= James Williams (cricketer) =

Welsh cricketer

Personal information
- Full name: James Robert Alexander Williams
- Born: 20 July 1973 (age 53); Neath, Glamorgan, Wales
- Batting: Right-handed
- Bowling: Right-arm off break

Domestic team information
- Years: Team
- 1997–1998: Wales Minor Counties
- 1993: Glamorgan

Career statistics
Competition	FC
Matches	1
Runs scored	6
Batting average	3.00
100s/50s	–/–
Top score	6
Balls bowled	–
Wickets	–
Bowling average	–
5 wickets in innings	–
10 wickets in match	–
Best bowling	–
Catches/stumpings	–/–
- Source: Cricinfo, 4 July 2010

James Robert Alexander Williams (born 20 July 1973) is a former Welsh cricketer. Williams was a right-handed batsman and a right-arm off break bowler. He was born at Neath, Glamorgan. He was educated at Clifton College and Durham University.

Williams made a single first-class appearance for Glamorgan against the touring Australians in 1993, being dismissed in both innings by Merv Hughes.

In 1997, he played two Minor Counties Championship fixtures for Wales Minor Counties against Dorset and Berkshire. He also represented the team in the 1998 MCCA Knockout Trophy against the Warwickshire Cricket Board. He subsequently returned to Glamorgan, where he became the county's youth coach.
