= James Williams-Richardson =

Anguillan footballer

Personal information
- Full name: James Williams-Richardson
- Date of birth: 5 May 1988 (age 38)
- Position: Midfielder

Senior career*
Years	Team	Apps	(Gls)
2007–2012	Maidenhead United		
2012–	Penn & Tylers Green		

International career^{‡}
2008–	Anguilla	2	(0)
- * Club domestic league appearances and goals as of 22 December 2008 ‡ National team caps and goals as of 22 December 2008

James Williams-Richardson (born 5 May 1988) is an Anguillan football player who is currently on trial at Premier League side Blackpool FC. William-Richardson used to play for Maidenhead United in the Conference South, and has now joined Penn & Tylers Green in the Hellenic Football League Division One East.

== International career ==
Williams-Richardson made his debut for Anguilla in a World Cup qualification match against El Salvador in February 2008. He also played in the return match, his only two caps by December 2008.
