= James Williams (Australian footballer) =

Australian rules footballer

Personal information
- Full name: James Williams
- Born: 1 February 1937
- Original team: Richmond Amateurs
- Height: 178 cm (5 ft 10 in)
- Weight: 75 kg (165 lb)

Playing career^{1}
Years	Club	Games (Goals)
1957–58	Richmond	6 (1)
- ^{1} Playing statistics correct to the end of 1958.

James Williams (born 1 February 1937) is a former Australian rules footballer who played with Richmond in the Victorian Football League (VFL).
