= Will James (rugby, born 1902) =

Wales international rugby union & league footballer

Personal information
- Full name: William P. James
- Born: 16 July 1902 Aberavon, Wales
- Died: 27 February 1972 (aged 69) Aberavon, Wales

Playing information

Rugby union
- Position: Wing
Club
Years	Team	Pld	T	G	FG	P
≤1925–≥25	Llanelli RFC
Representative
Years	Team	Pld	T	G	FG	P
1925	Wales	2	1	0	0	3

Rugby league
Club
Years	Team	Pld	T	G	FG	P
	Leeds
Representative
Years	Team	Pld	T	G	FG	P
1927	Glamorgan	≥1

William P. James (16 July 1902 – 27 February 1972) was a Welsh rugby union and professional rugby league footballer who played in the 1920s. He played representative level rugby union (RU) for Wales, and at club level for Llanelli RFC, as a wing, and representative level rugby league (RL) for Glamorgan, and at club level for Leeds, as a wing.

== Background ==
Will James was born in Aberavon, Wales, and he died 69 in Aberavon, Wales.

== Playing career ==
=== International honours ===
Will James won caps for Wales (RU) while at Llanelli RFC in 1925 against England, and Scotland.

=== County honours ===
Will James played on the wing in Glamorgan's 18–14 victory over Monmouthshire in the non-County Championship match during the 1926–27 season at Taff Vale Park, Pontypridd on Saturday 30 April 1927.
