= Bill James (politician) =

American politician

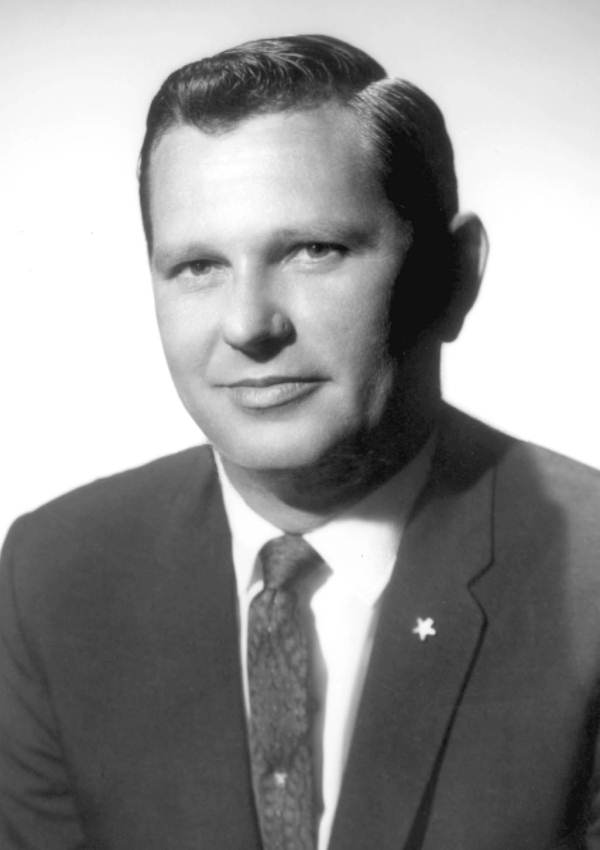

Member of the Florida House of Representatives
- In office 1972–1978

Personal details
- Born: January 8, 1930 Boynton Beach, Florida, U.S.
- Died: September 14, 2022 (aged 92)
- Party: Republican
- Occupation: insurance agent

William G. James (January 8, 1930 – September 14, 2022) was an American politician in the state of Florida.

James was born in Boynton Beach, Florida, and attended the University of Florida. He was an insurance agent. He served in the Florida House of Representatives for the 80th district, as a Republican. He was Minority Leader of the House from 1976 to 1978.

James died on September 14, 2022 at his home, at the age of 92.
