= Billy James (footballer, born 1891) =

English footballer

Personal information
- Full name: William Ebsworth James
- Date of birth: 17 December 1891
- Place of birth: Salford, England
- Date of death: 1960 (aged 68–69)
- Position: Winger

Senior career*
Years	Team	Apps	(Gls)
1909–1910	Eston United		
1910–1913	Middlesbrough	24	(8)
1920–1921	Portsmouth	22	(3)
1921–1922	West Ham United	54	(7)
Total		100	(18)
- * Club domestic league appearances and goals

William Ebsworth James (17 December 1891 – 1960) was an English footballer who played in the Football League for Middlesbrough, Portsmouth and West Ham United.
