= Vasind =

- City
- Location of Vasind in Maharashtra, India
- Coordinates: 19.4167°N 73.2667°E
- Country: India
- State: Maharashtra
- District: Thane district

Population
  - Total: 15,880

Languages
  - Official: Marathi
- Time zone: UTC+5:30 (IST)
- PIN: 421601

Vasind is a city in Shahapur taluka of Thane district in the Indian state of Maharashtra. It is suburban city of Mumbai.Mumbai-Vasind distance is about 63.1 km. Vashind is a census town.

== Economy ==
Vasind hosts various medium and large scale industries in and around. Major industrial plants are :

- The JSW Steel Ltd has one of its important plants located in Vasind.
- Essel Propack Limited

== Demographics ==
Religions in Vasind
Religion	Percent
Hindus	86.82%
Buddhists	8.42%
Muslims	3.74%
Christian	0.51%
Jain	0.25%
Sikh	0.15%
Not Stated	0.08%

As of 2001 India census, Vashind had a population of 15,880. Males constitute 53% of the population and females 47%. Vashind has an average literacy rate of 74%, higher than the national average of 59.5%: male literacy is 80%, and female literacy is 68%. In Vashind, 14% of the population is under 6 years of age.

Schedule Caste (SC) constitutes 13.29% while Schedule Tribe (ST) were 9.71% of total population in Vasind (CT).

== Geography & Climate ==
Vasind is situated at approximately 19° 24' 23.54 N | 73° 15' 30.06 E. Vasind lies on the northern bank of Bhatsai river at an altitude of 25.52 m above sea level.

=== Climate ===
Climate data for Vasind
Month	Jan	Feb	Mar	Apr	May	Jun	Jul	Aug	Sep	Oct	Nov	Dec	Year
Mean daily maximum °C (°F)	29.3 (84.7)	34.5 (94.1)	43.6 (110.5)	48.7 (119.7)	38.7 (101.7)	31.9 (89.4)	29.8 (85.6)	29.3 (84.7)	30.1 (86.2)	32.9 (91.2)	33.4 (92.1)	32.0 (89.6)	34.5 (94.1)
Mean daily minimum °C (°F)	14.6 (58.3)	16.3 (61.3)	19.6 (67.3)	25.7 (78.3)	26.1 (79.0)	25.8 (78.4)	24.8 (76.6)	24.5 (76.1)	24.0 (75.2)	23.1 (73.6)	20.5 (68.9)	18.2 (64.8)	21.9 (71.5)
Average precipitation mm (inches)	2.3 (0.09)	1.0 (0.04)	0.8 (0.03)	1.8 (0.07)	13.5 (0.53)	432.6 (17.03)	946.1 (37.25)	553.3 (21.78)	294.1 (11.58)	87.1 (3.43)	20.6 (0.81)	2.0 (0.08)	2,355.2 (92.72)
Source: Government of Maharashtra

== Transportation ==
The nearest airport is Chhatrapati Shivaji Maharaj International Airport in Mumbai which is about 63 km away.

Vasind is well connected to (Mumbai Suburban Railway) by Vasind Railway Station. It is on the rail line between Mumbai and Kasara.

Vasind is also well connected to Mumbai and Nashik by National Highway 160 (India). By road Vasind is 63 km North East of Mumbai, and 106 km South West of Nashik.
