= Kasara railway station =

Railway Station in Maharashtra, India

Kasara
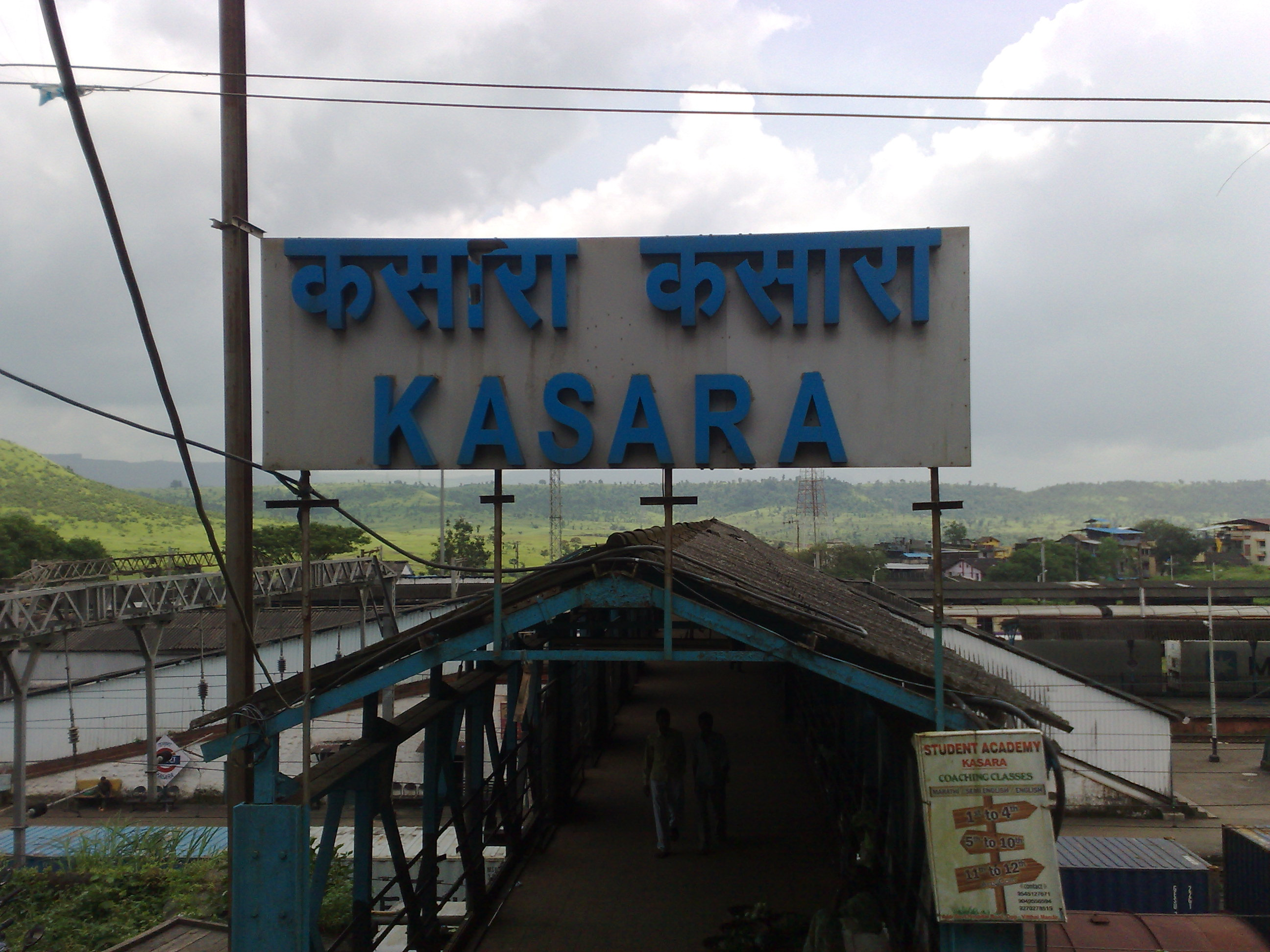

General information
- Coordinates: 19°38′54″N 73°28′23″E
- Elevation: 308.42 metres (1,011.9 ft)
- System: Indian Railways and Mumbai Suburban Railway station
- Owner: Indian Railways
- Line: Central Line
- Platforms: 04
- Tracks: 10

Construction
- Structure type: On-Ground
- Parking: No
- Cycle facilities: No
- Accessible: Disabled access

Other information
- Status: Active
- Station code: KSRA
- Fare zone: Central Railways

History
- Opened: 28 January 1861

Services
Preceding station	Mumbai Suburban Railway	Following station
Umbermali towards Chhatrapati Shivaji Terminus	Central line	Terminus
Route map
Location
- Location within India Location within Maharashtra

Kasara (station code: KSRA) is a railway station on the Central line of the Mumbai Suburban Railway network. It is the final stop in the north-east sector of the Central Line.

== Services ==
It takes up to 162 minutes for slow local suburban trains to reach Kasara from Chhatrapati Shivaji Terminus whereas the fast locals take 136 mins.

== Connections ==
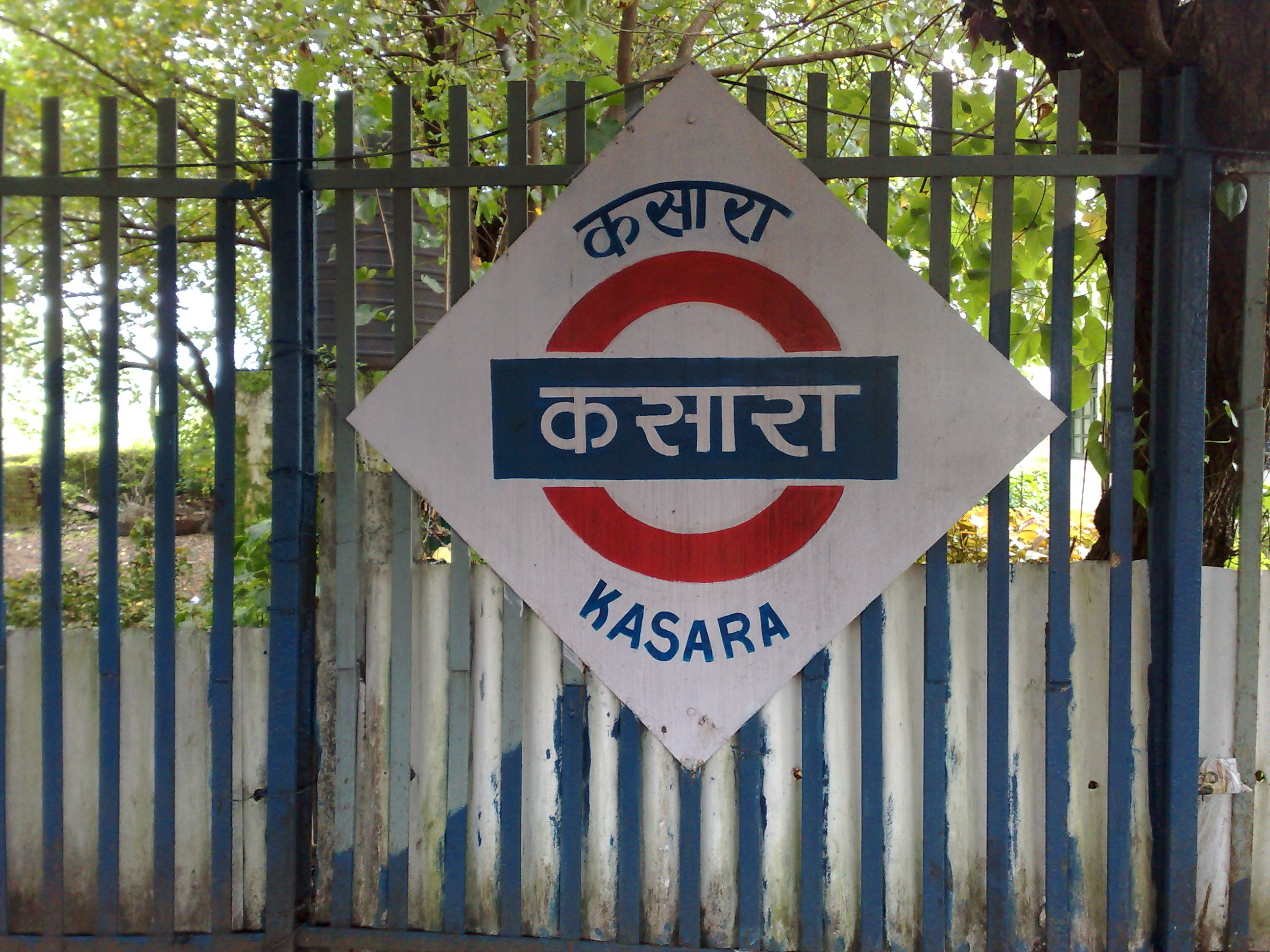
Kasara railway station Platform board.

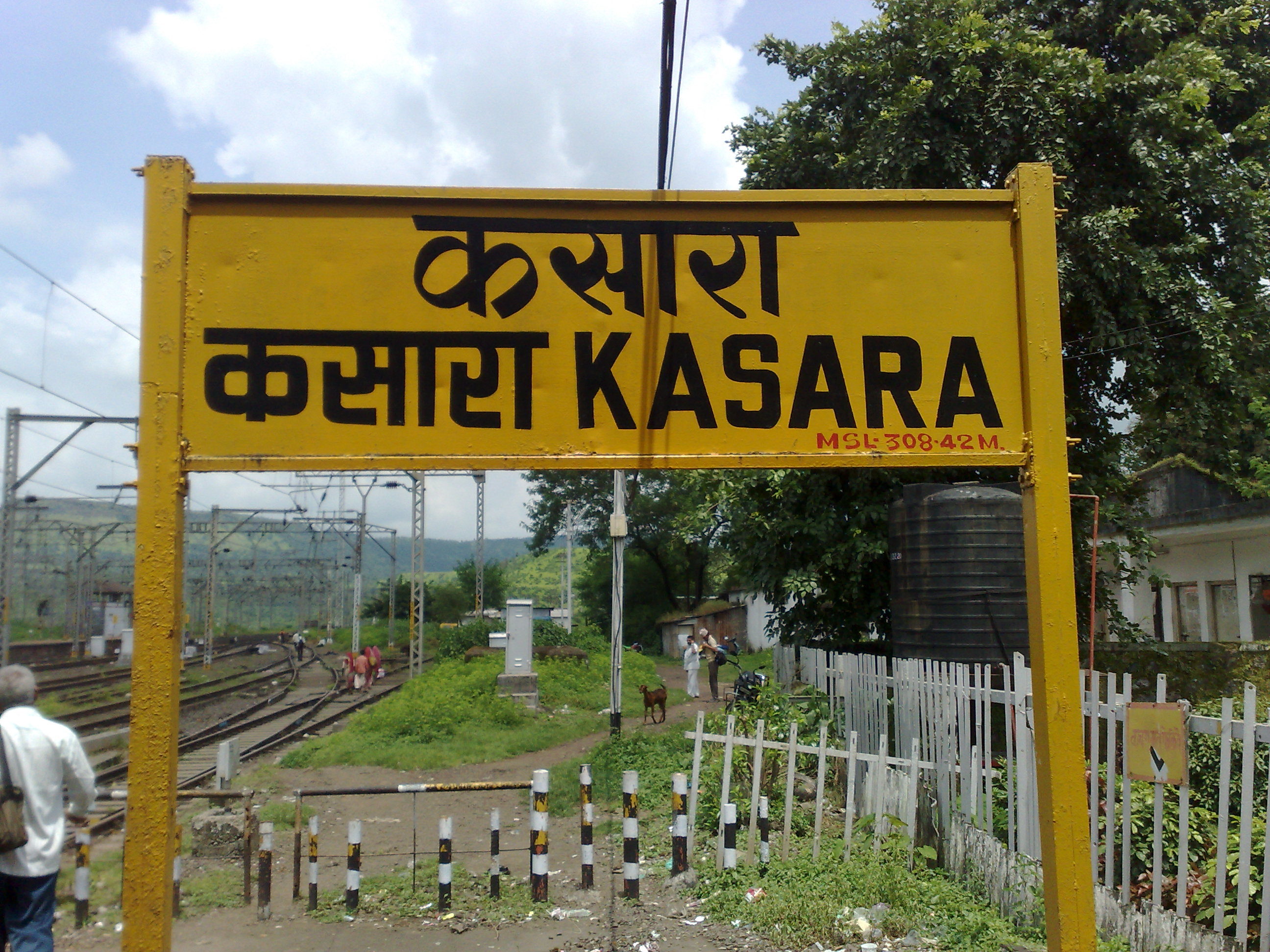
Kasara railway station Station board.

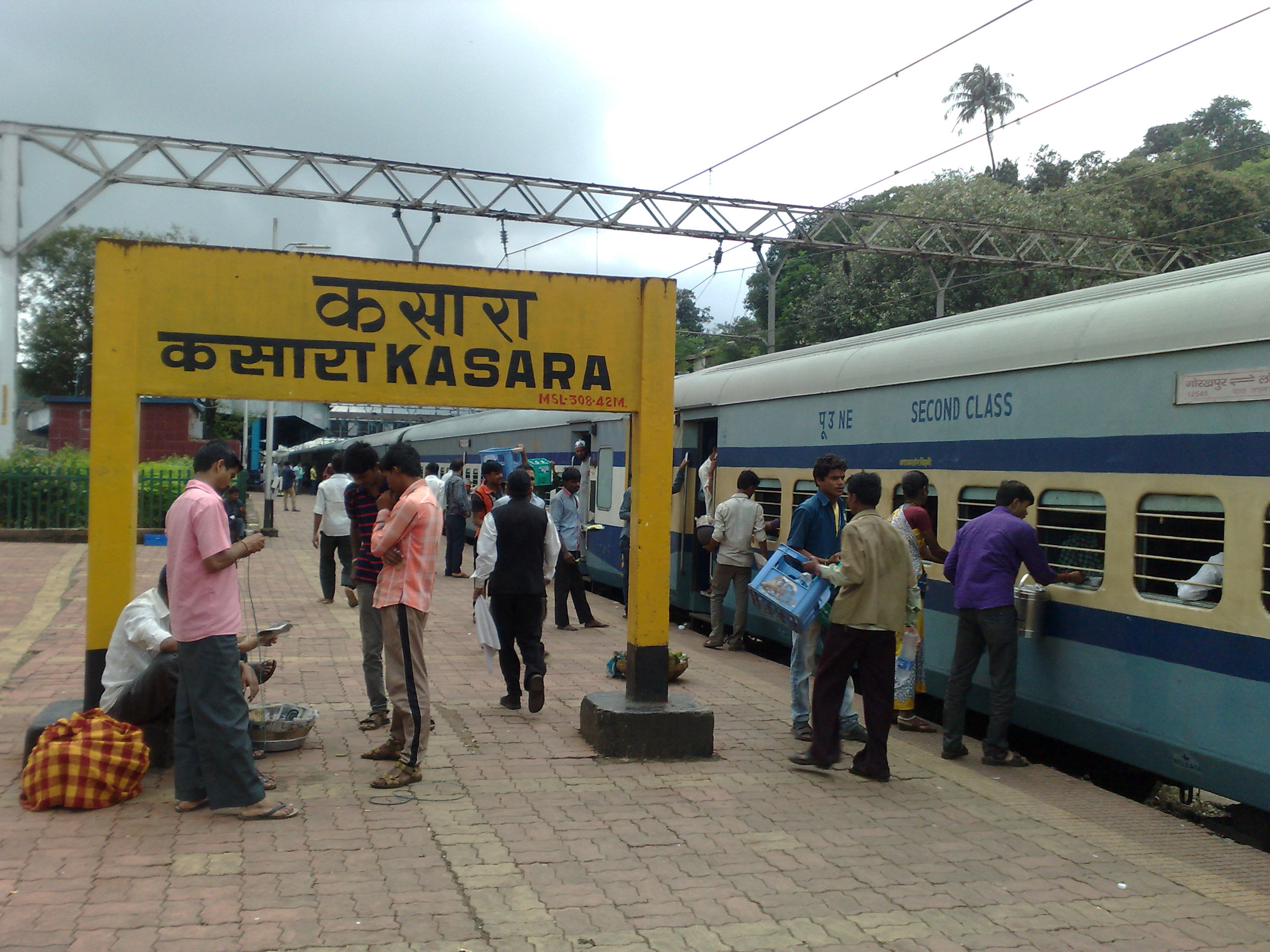
Gorakhpur Lokmanya Tilak Terminus Superfast Express at Kasara.

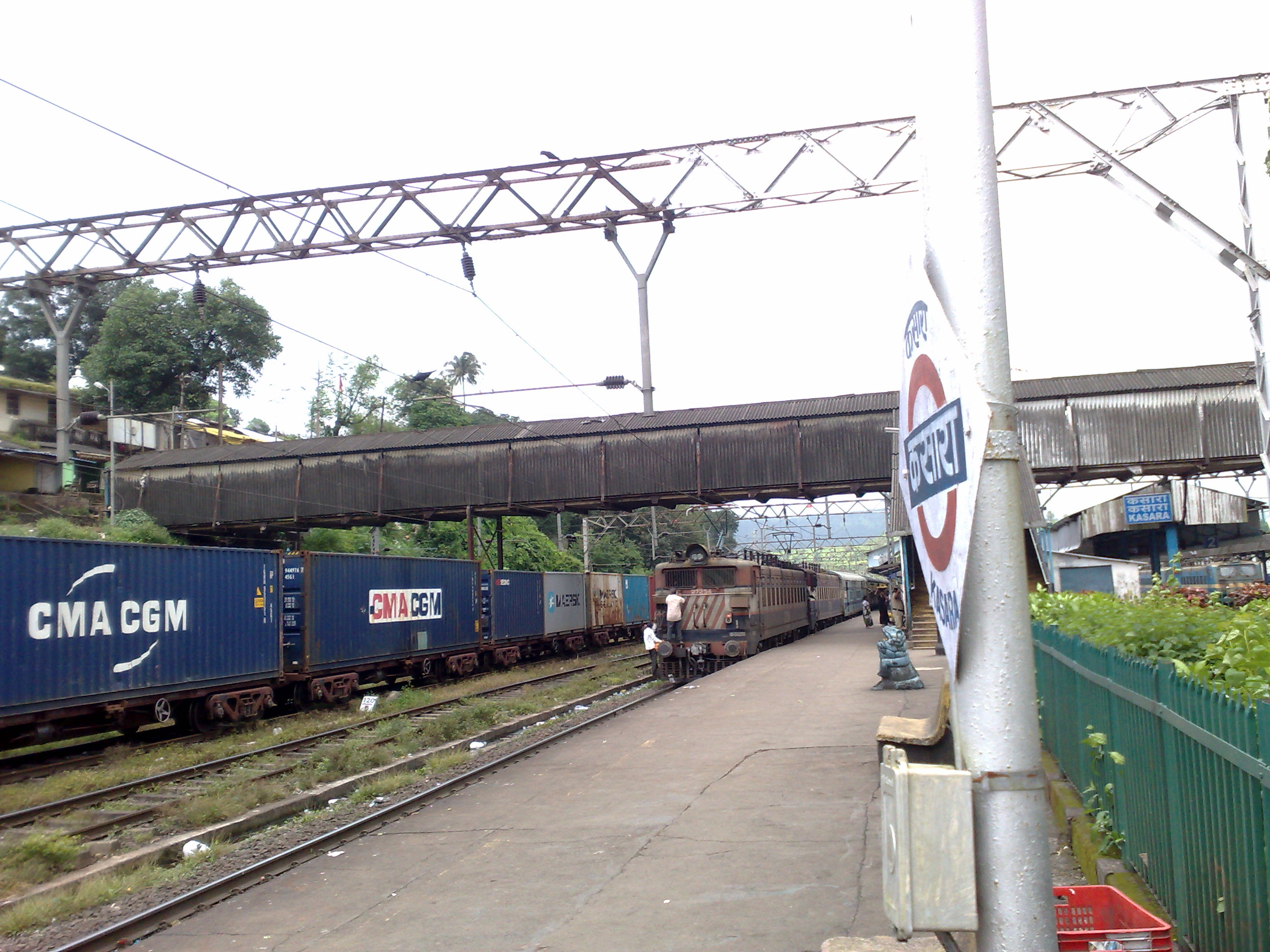
Gorakhpur Lokmanya Tilak Terminus Superfast Express leaving Kasara with WAG 7 bankers.

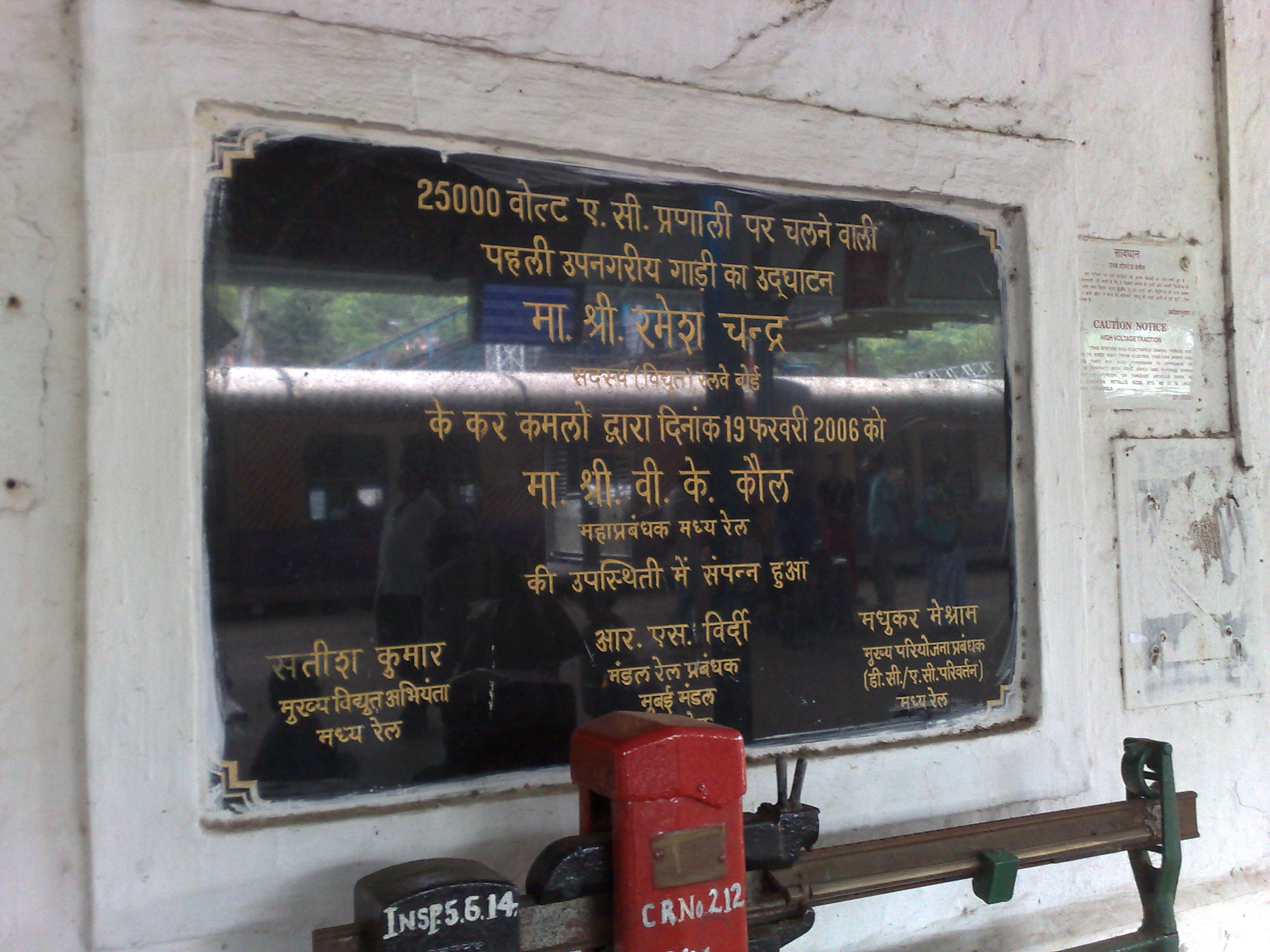
Kasara railway station - Electrification plaque.
