= P.V.R. Raja =

Indian composer and musician

PVR Raja
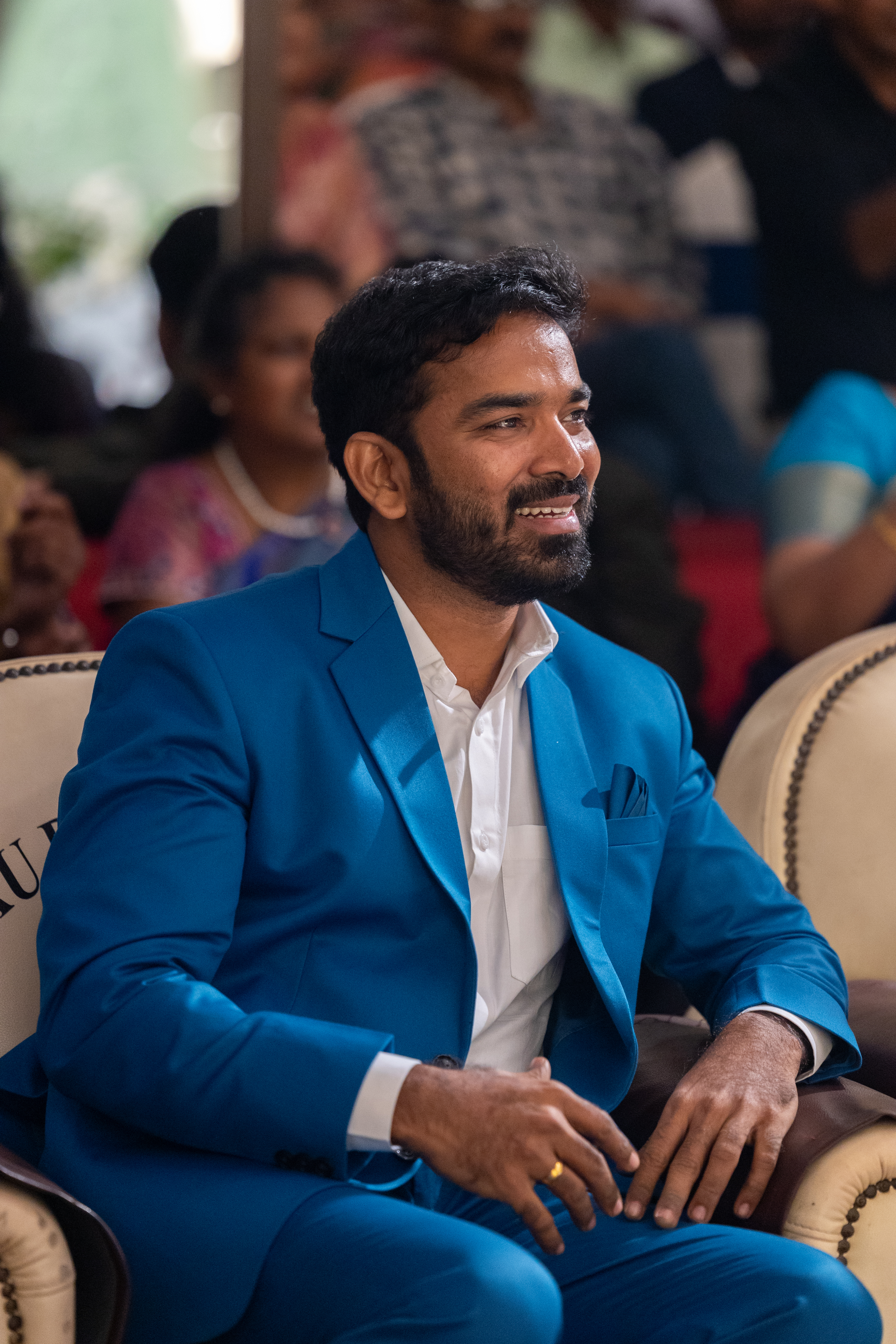
- PVR Raja in 2025

Background information
- Also known as: PVR Raja; Short films Maestro; Ilaiyaraaja of Short films
- Born: Penumatsa Venkata Ramaraju; June 1, 1985 (age 41); Vizianagaram, Andhra Pradesh, India
- Genres: Film score; Pop; Indie music; Folk; Indian classical; Filmi; World music
- Occupations: Composer; Guitarist; Lyricist; Music producer; Music Director; Songwriter; Playback singer; Instrumentalist; Musician; Film composer
- Instruments: Guitar; Vocals; Keyboards
- Works: P.V.R. Raja discography
- Years active: 2005 – present
- Labels: T-Series; Saregama; Sony Music India; Aditya Music; Times Music; Madhura Audio; Anand Audio; Lahari Music; Sony Music; Mango Music; ZEDXSTUDIO
- Spouse: Ramya Miryala (m. 2025)
- Website: pvrraja.com

Penumatsa Venkata Ramaraju (born 1 June 1985) known professionally as PVR Raja, is an Indian music composer, record producer, songwriter and guitarist who works in Telugu cinema. He is nicknamed "Short films Maestro" and "Ilaiyaraaja of Short films". He initially composed music for over 250 Short films and Independent films.

Raja has composed music for the films Vitamin She (2020), Black (2022) and Madhi (2022). He won the Andhra Pradesh state award in the guitar category at the 2011 National Youth Festival (India). Raja entered the India Book of Records for composing the most number of short Telugu films.

== Early life ==
He completed his elementary education from R.C.M. St. Anthony's High School, intermediate school from M.S.N. Degree College and undergraduate degree from A.G.L. College. He completed Bachelor of Arts (B.A.), Bachelor's Degree from Andhra University in 2005 and studied music at Maharajah's Government College of Music and Dance. He worked as a music teacher before becoming a music composer.

Raja worked as a music teacher in Hyderabad Hindu Public School, Shraddha Centre For Special Education, Shalom Music School, Symphony Academy of Music and St. Alphonsa's High School.

== Career ==
Raja made his debut as a music director with the short film Arya 3 produced by Puri Jagannadh own production company Vaishno Academy. He provided the background score for the film 1 Hour produced by actress and politician Roja Selvamani. Raja composed music for the movie Atma Rama Ananda Ramana produced by Annapurna College of Film and Media and streaming on aha. He has predominantly composed music over 250 digital short films and Independent films from 2013 to present in English, Telugu, Kannada and Hindi languages.

Raja worked as music director for the short films under the own production and direction of actor and writer L. B. Sriram. He composed music for ETV Dhee title winner Yashwanth Master's debut video album Dilantha Adhire.

He won the first place in Andhra pradesh state level competitions for guitar category in National Youth Festival 2011 organized by Ministry of Youth Affairs and Sports, Government of India. His albums released in major record labels in India such as Hey Bhoothanaadhaya in T-Series, Vitamin She in Times Music, Madhi in Aditya Music, Kaala Bhairava Ashtakam and Jai Shri Ram in Sony Music India. In the year 2020, three films scored by PVR Raja won awards at the SparkOTT film contest organized by Indian film director Ram Gopal Varma himself. MR. Productions Okka Kshanam short film is Raja's 100th film as a composer.

== Awards and nominations ==
1. 2005, 3rd position at Vizianagaram district level guitar category in National Youth Festival Competition.
2. 2007, Top 18th place in 7 Up Ooh La La La band hunt conducted by music director A. R. Rahman.
3. 2011, 1st position at Prakasam district level guitar category in National Youth Festival Competition.
4. 2011, Andhra Pradesh state awardee in light music category at National Youth Festival, held in Hyderabad.
5. 2011, 1st place at Andhra Pradesh state guitar category in National Youth Festival competitions.
6. 2011, Nominated for the national level competitions guitar category in National Youth Festival on behalf of Andhra Pradesh State.
7. 2013, Semi finalist in Hyderabad Times Fresh face 2013 competitions.
8. 2017, TANA International Telugu Short Film Awards best music director for Itlu Mee Laila short film.
9. 2020, Nominated in SIIMA short film awards for Antharardham for best music director category.
10. 2023, Awarded by India Book of Records for Music composed by an individual for maximum short Telugu films.

== Discography ==
=== Feature films ===
Year	Film	Language		Ref(s)
2017	Jandhyala Rasina Prema Katha	Telugu		
2018	Mitti: Back to Roots	Hindi		
2020	Samshayam	Telugu		
2020	Vitamin She	Telugu		
2022	Madhi	Telugu		
2022	Black	Telugu	Background score only	
2023	Maro Prapancham	Telugu		
2025	1000 Words	Telugu		

=== Singles and album songs ===
Year	Album/Song Title	Record label	Language	Notes
2018	I Said I Love You	Lahari Music	English	
2019	Maaya	Carpediem Technology Systems Private Limited	Telugu	
2020	Dearuu Darlinguuu	Media6(India)Pvt.Ltd.	Telugu	
2021	Vennela Vacche Padhamani	ZEDXSTUDIO	Telugu	
2022	Neetho Nadichina	Mango Music	Telugu	
2022	Capture	Times Music	Telugu	
2023	Kaala Bhairava Ashtakam	Sony Music India	Sanskrit	
2023	Dosthi	Aditya Music	Telugu	
2023	Jai Shri Ram	Sony Music India	Sanskrit	
2026	Hey Boothanaadhaya	T-Series	Telugu	

=== Short films ===
Year	Title	Platform	Language	Ref(s)
2014	Arya 3	Filmy Time	Telugu	
2016	Itlu Mee Laila	RunwayReel	Telugu	
2016	One Hour	TeluguOne	Telugu	
2017	Okka Kshanam	Subash Chandra	Telugu	
2017	Oopirilo Oopiriga	iQlikchannel	Telugu	
2019	Antharartham	Subash Chandra	Telugu	
2019	Maa Bujjakka Great	L B Sriram	Telugu	
2019	Swacha Bhaaratheeyudu	L B Sriram	Telugu	
2020	Atma Rama Ananda Ramana	Aha	Telugu	
2020	Nuvvu Nenu Ee Kshanam	iQlikchannel	Telugu	
2020	Roots	L B Sriram	Telugu	

=== Independent films ===
Year	Title	Platform	Language	Ref(s)
2015	Happy Ending	RunwayReel	Telugu	
2015	Advika	TeluguOne	Telugu	
2016	Akasamantha Prema	RunwayReel	Telugu	
2017	Naa Seetha MahaLaxmi	TeluguOne	Telugu	
2018	Pushpa Vilaapam	iQlikchannel	Telugu	
2019	Maaya	MX Player	Telugu	
2021	Happy Married LIfe	50mm Productions	Kannada	
2021	Chai Kahani	MX Player	Telugu	
2022	Capture	MX Player	Telugu	

=== Web series ===
Year	Title	Platform	Language	Ref(s)
2017	Geetha Subramanyam	Wirally	Telugu	
2017	Michael Madan Kamaraju	Wirally	Telugu	
