= Nahur, India =

Nahur
- Suburban
- Location within Mumbai
- Coordinates: 19.157°N 72.941°E
- Country: India
- State: Maharashtra
- District: Mumbai Suburban
- Taluka/Tehsil: Kurla

Languages
  - Official: Marathi
- Time zone: UTC+5:30 (IST)
- PIN: 400078
- Vehicle registration: MH-03
- Website: https://mumbaisuburban.gov.in/

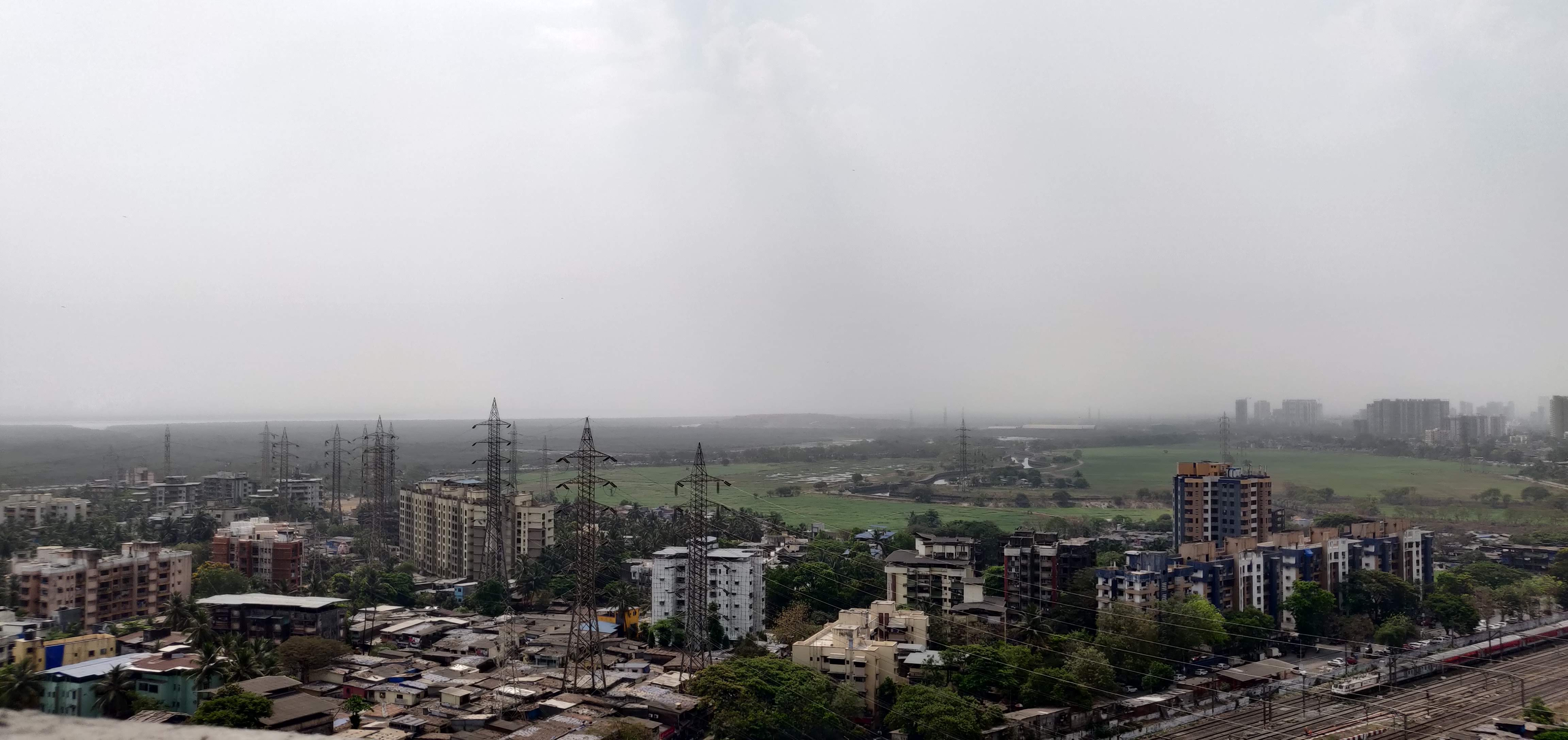
Nahur Aerial View on East Side

Nahur is a north-eastern suburb of Mumbai and it lies between Mulund and Bhandup. Nahur railway station is on the Central Railway line of the Mumbai Suburban Railway, opened in 21 April 2006. Another landmark in the area is the Nahur bridge and flyover. The Nahur ROB connects Eastern Express Highway to Mulund and it was made into an eight lane road in 2023.
