= Rupali =

Rupali may refer to:

- Rupali Bank, a commercial bank in Bangladesh
- Rupali Akhter, Bangladeshi kabaddi player
- Rupali Bhosale, Indian television actress
- Rupali Ganguly (born 1977), Indian actress
- Rupali Krishnarao, Indian actress
- Rupali Repale (born 1982), Indian swimmer and triathlete
