= Bhandup =

Suburb in Mumbai, India

Bhandup Bhandupeshwar
- Suburban
- Location within Mumbai
- Coordinates: 19.14°N 72.93°E
- Country: India
- State: Maharashtra
- District: Mumbai Suburban
- City (Ward): Mumbai (S)
- Taluka/Tehsil: Kurla
- Established: 1803

Government
  - Type: Municipal Corporation
  - Body: Brihanmumbai Municipal Corporation (MCGM)
  - M.L.A: Ramesh Korgaonkar; Shiv Sena (since 2019)
  - M.P.: Manoj Kotak; BJP (since 2019)
- Elevation: 5.205 m (17.08 ft)

Population (2001 Census)
  - Total: 691,227
- Demonym: Bhandupkar

Languages
  - Official: Marathi
- Time zone: UTC+5:30 (IST)
- PIN: 400078 (West) and 400042 (East)
- Area code: 022
- Vehicle registration: MH-03
- Lok Sabha constituency: Mumbai North East
- Vidhan Sabha constituency: Bhandup West
- Website: https://mumbaisuburban.gov.in/

Bhandup (Pronunciation: [bʱaːɳɖup]) is a suburban locality in Mumbai, in the state of Maharashtra, India. The name Bhandup is derived from Bhandupeshwar, one of the names of the Hindu god Shiva. An old temple dedicated to Lord Shiva, the Bhandupeshwar Mahadev Mandir, is located in Bhandup (west) near Moti Bai Wadi IDUBS high school. Sonapur signal is north lead line on L.B.S. Marg and south is dockyard colony. Bhandup railway station is on the Central line of the Mumbai Suburban Railway network. A few fast trains stop at Bhandup station, mostly during the peak hours.

== History ==
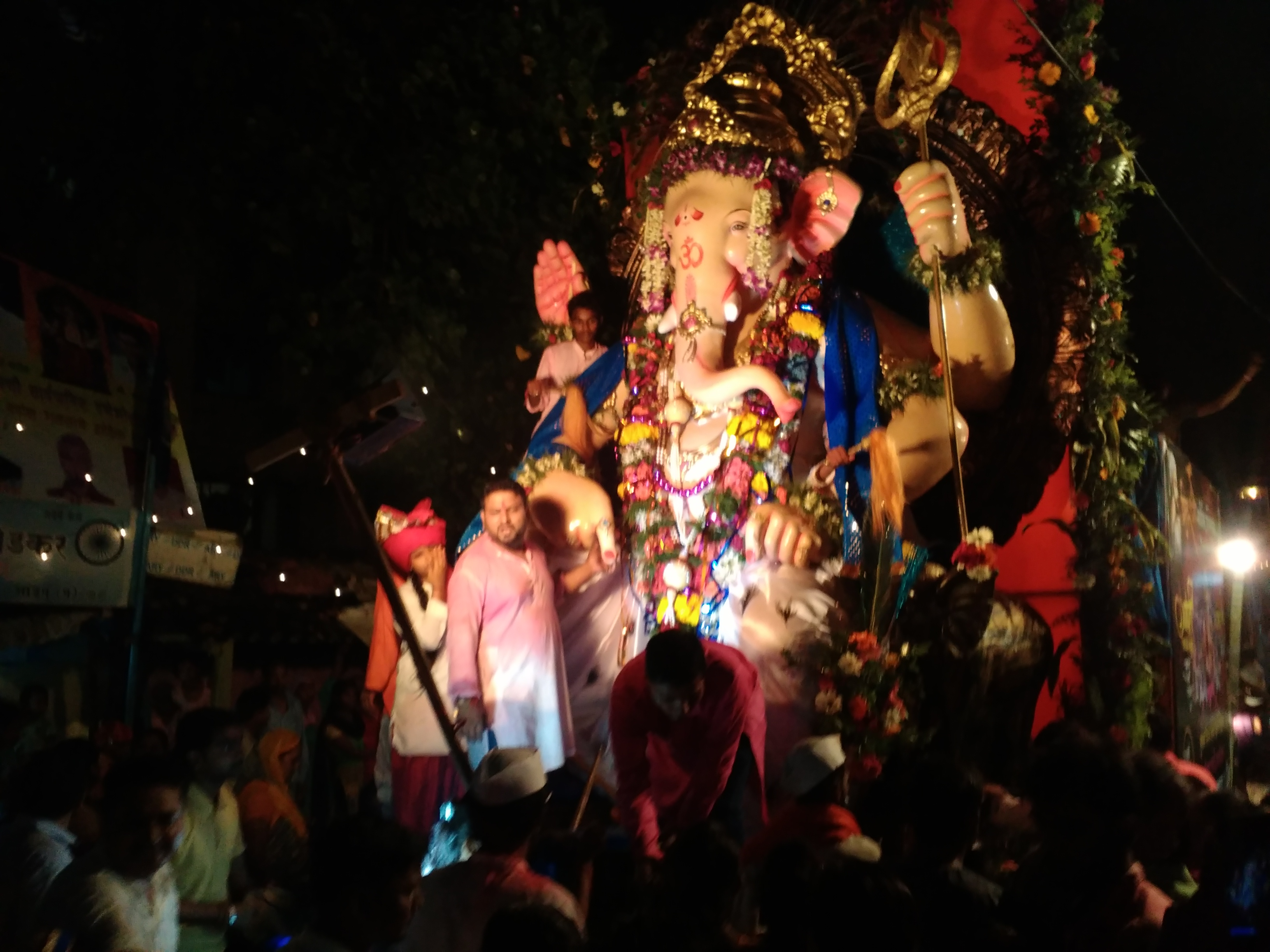
2016 Ganpati Visarjan (Ganesh Chaturthi) - Bhandup west

Bhandup is one of the oldest suburbs in Mumbai. It is home to the Shivaji Talao, or Shivaji Lake, named after the Maratha ruler, Shivaji. Devotees of Ganapati immerse idols of the elephant god, Ganesh at the lake during the months of August through September, as well as in the Bhandupeshwar Kundh in Bhandup Village East, near the Eastern Express Highway.

The earliest records of Bhandup come from 1803, and show the contemporary Bhandup estate to comprise Bhandup, Nahur, and Kanjur Marg.

The Silaharas, also known as Shilahara, were the rulers of this region, with partial Dravidian ancestry, who later mixed with the Prakrit speaking Indo-Aryan locals of Konkan. The Silaharas promoted socio-economic progress in the 11th century around Bombay. To control the regions in Bombay and Thane, they built the Rajapatha, passing from the north of Bhandup, following the current Bombay-Thane road.

Historical records indicate that the distillery at Bhandup was one of the two biggest sources of liquor in the Bombay Presidency, the other being the Uran distillery.

Bhandup was also one of the first railway stations in India. The first train ran between Bori Bunder and Thane on 16 April 1853 with 400 passengers aboard 14 railway carriages, at 3:35 pm. It is said that the idea to connect Bombay with Thane and Kalyan occurred to Mr. George Clark, the Chief Engineer of the Bombay Government, on a visit to Bhandup in 1843.

However, Bhandup was not a part of Bombay until 1950, when the boundaries of the Bombay municipal corporation were extended up to Andheri on the western side and Bhandup on the eastern side.

== Demographics ==
Bhandup falls within the S-ward, as defined by the Municipal Corporation of Greater Mumbai. The population of Bhandup has risen exponentially in the last twenty years.

Census Year	Population	Density per square km	% change in population from previous year	Sex ratio (females/1000 males)
1981	297,108	7860	NA	740
1991	568,028	15,027	91%	813
2001	691,227	10,800	21%	823

- The discordance between population and density could be due to re-drawing of ward boundaries

The majority of residents of Bhandup are Hindus by religion. The dominant language is Marathi. Although a large percentage of the residents are natives of Maharashtra, in the last few decades, there has been a huge influx of non-native residents into Bhandup, reflecting the trend witnessed for Mumbai as a whole.

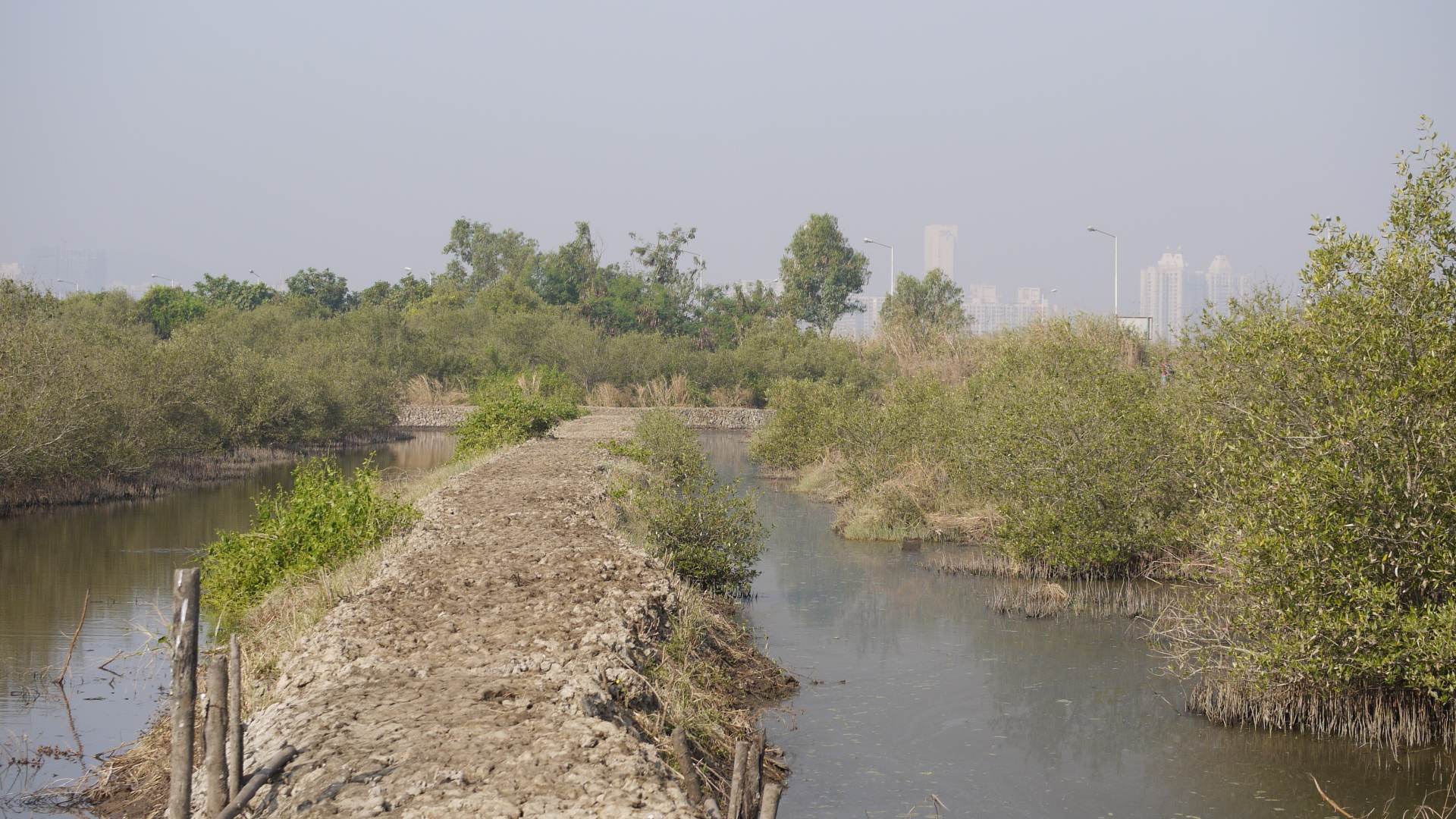
near Bhandup Pumping Station

== Economy ==
=== Industry ===
According to the 2001 census, there were 12,380 industrial establishments in Bhandup (S-Ward), providing employment to 36,921 residents of Bhandup. The rest of the employed populace are employed outside the limits of the S-ward.

One of the first industries to start in this area was Crompton Greaves in 1937, currently in Kanjur Marg. Currently, almost all of the industries in Bhandup are in Bhandup West, including CEAT Tyres, Asian Paints Ltd, BASF, and the Indian Smelting And Refining Company Limited. Apart from these big companies, there are several small-scale manufacturing units all over Bhandup West.

The presence of a large number of industries, coupled with large traffic flows throughout the day, led to Bhandup's air is one of the worst in Mumbai in 1999. However, several of the polluting industries have moved out of Mumbai since, leading to slightly better air quality.

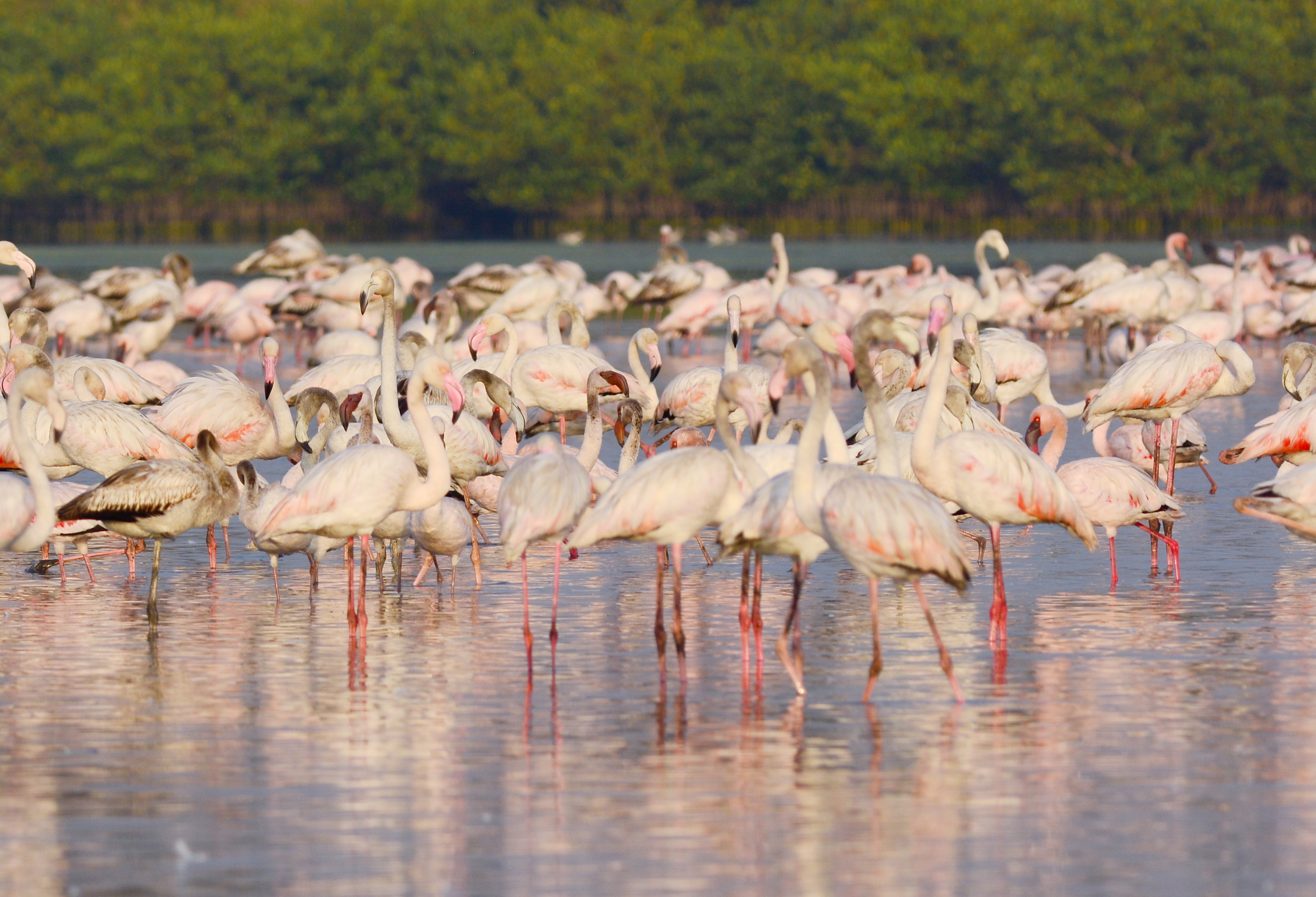

Bhandup has Asia's biggest water filtration plant. The eastern sections of Kanjurmarg and Nahur blend into Bhandup without clear demarcation.

=== Retail ===
In recent years, several mall construction projects have been initiated in Bhandup. One reason for Bhandup being a prime location for malls is its proximity to affluent areas like Powai and Mulund. In the past few years, several industries in Bhandup have shifted or started shifting out of Mumbai, rendering vast tracts of land vacant. These land-plots are being used for the construction of huge residential complexes, in turn, providing the customer base for these malls.

Neptune Magnet Mall is a shopping mall that is part of a satellite township, Living Point, comprising six towers of 22 stories each being developed by Neptune group. Some of the other malls in the area include the Leo Mall and a shopping space being developed by HBS Centrix. Dreams the Mall, developed by Satra Properties, located close to Bhandup Railway Station, was one of the biggest malls in Bhandup. However due to multiple fires, the 1st occurring on 25-March-2021 in Sunrise Hospital with a loss of 11 lives and the 2nd incident on 04-March-2022 the Dreams mall is currently non operational.

== Transport ==
Bhandup is connected with the rest of the city through the road network. The arterial road of Bhandup West is the Agra Road i.e. L.B.S. Marg, while Bhandup East is flanked by the Eastern Express highway. Four buses (numbers 144, 453, 545 and 603), however, pass through Bhandup East, as the area is relatively sparsely populated. There is also a special bus service in the mornings for female commuters, going from Bhandup to Andheri. There is also a special State Transport Bus service in the morning which run between Bhandup and CWC (Navi Mumbai) and Navi Mumbai Municipal Transport Corporation runs a bus (route no 144) through Bhandup East which plies between Andheri East and Airoli.

Bhandup is also a railway station on the Central Line of the Mumbai Suburban Railway network, between KanjurMarg and Nahur.

== Schools ==
There are over 35 schools in Bhandup. Notable schools include:

- NES High School and Junior College

=== Colleges ===
Bhandup has five major accredited colleges, out of which two are in Bhandup (East) and three in Bhandup (West). All of them are affiliated to the University of Mumbai. The breakup is as follows:

Name of college	Location	NAAC accreditation status	Class levels Junior College
NES Ratnam College Of Arts, Science & Commerce	N.E.S. Marg, Bhandup (West)	A	Junior college to Postgraduate
V. K. Krishna Menon College of Commerce and Economics & Science	Bhandup (East)	B	Junior college to Postgraduate
Ramanand Arya D. A. V. College, Station Road	Datar Colony, Bhandup (East)	A	Junior college to Bachelors
Jijamata Junior College, Maharashtra Nagar	Bhandup (West)	B	Junior college to Bachelors
Shri Ram College of Commerce, Subhash Nagar	Bhandup (West)	B	Junior college to Postgraduate

== Sports ==
=== Football ===
Bhandup has several Football clubs which are members of the Mumbai District Football Association (MDFA), including the Sunday Boys Football Club, the GKW Rangers, Ushanagar Youth CluB, DATAR CHAMP'S Football Club (DC), Samarth Garden Football Club (S.G.F.C), UshaComplex Football club (U.C.F.C). And Gunners Football Club and GN Boys and Loss Fc and Satya Vijay Football Club (SVFC), Bhandup Sports Academy (BSA).

Bhandup also has its own football association called the Bhandup Suburb Football Association (BSFA).

=== Cricket ===
Bhandup has several cricket clubs.

== Social organisations ==
There are several social organizations in Bhandup of which Sarvajanik Pooja Samiti Bhandup village east, founded in 1946, is the oldest, followed by Adrash Sports Club (1956), followed by Vijay Krida Mandal, Shree Saibhajan Sanskrutik Mandal (Bhandup), Vikas Mandal, Sai Vihar, Prajapita Brahma Kumaris Ishwariya Vishwa Vidyalaya, Jeevan Vidya Mission and the Rotary Club of Mumbai Bhandup., Shiv Shambhu Raje Pratishthan Village Road Bhandup

== Notable people ==
- Vinod Kambli - former India Test/ODI player. Grew up in a chawl in the Kanjur/Bhandup area
- Dhananjay Mahadik - Indian National Hockey Player
- Ashok Patil- MLC from Bhandup west
- Sanjay Dina Patil - ex-Member of Parliament-North-East Mumbai and Nationalist Congress Party
- Om Puri - Bollywood actor used to stay here before getting into Bollywood
- Sanjay Raut - editor of Saamana and Shiv Sena leader
- Rupali Repale - long-distance swimmer
- Jemimah Rodrigues - Indian Women's Cricket Teams Youngest Player
- Ramchandra Sapre - chess master
