= Vitamin She (2020 film) =

- Directed by: V. Jayashankarr
- Written by: V. Jayashankarr
- Produced by: Ravi Kumar Polishetty
- Starring: Srikanth Gurram, Prachi Thaker
- Cinematography: Shiva Shankara Vara Prasad
- Edited by: Nani Lukka
- Music by: P.V.R. Raja
- Production company: Full Moon Media Production
- Distributed by: MX Player, Amazon Prime Video
- Release date: 29 December 2020
- Running time: 73 minutes
- Country: India
- Language: Telugu

Vitamin She is a 2020 Indian Telugu-language comedy drama film written and directed by V. Jayashankarr who made his debut directional with Paper Boy Movie and produced by Ravi Kumar Polishetty under the banner Full Moon Media Production. The film features Srikanth Gurram and Prachi Thaker in lead roles with Ranjit Reddy and Sanjeev Joshi in pivotal roles. Music composed by P.V.R. Raja. The movie was filmed during the lockdown and released on MX Player and Amazon Prime Video.

== Plot ==
Software Engineer Leo alias Lingababu Yoganandam is a smart phone addicted person. Also, while spending time with his cell phone, he spends the rest of his time in love with a girl named Vaidhehi who works in the same company. He is wondering how to express his love to that girl. In this way his phone will be lost and a new phone will be bought. But the moment the new phone comes into his hands, his life takes a turn.

== Cast ==
- Srikanth Gurram as Leo
- Prachi Thaker as Vaidhehi

== Soundtrack ==
Vitamin She (2020 film)

Soundtrack album by P.V.R. Raja
- Released: 2021
- Recorded: 2022
- Genre: Feature film soundtrack
- Length: 5:56
- Language: Telugu
- Label: Times Music
- Producer: P.V.R. Raja

P.V.R. Raja chronology
Jandhyala Rasina Prema Katha	Vitamin She (2020 film) (2021)	Madhi (2022 film) (2022)
External audio
- EP on Spotify

The film score and soundtrack album of the film are composed by P.V.R. Raja.

Track list
No.	Title	Lyrics	Singer(s)	Length
1.	"Ninne Chusina Kshaname"	P.V.R. Raja	Dhanunjay Seepana	2:16
2.	"Ninne Chusina Kshaname"	P.V.R. Raja	Brinda	1:23
3.	"Naa Yadhane"	P.V.R. Raja	Dhanunjay Seepana	2:17
Total length:				5:56

== Release ==
The film was released on 29 December 2020.

== Critical reception ==
The film received 2.75 stars out of five in a review by The Hans India and 3 stars out of five in a review by The Times of India telugu.samayam.com.
