= Mitti: Back to Roots =

2022 film by Anshul Sinha

Mitti-back to roots
- Directed by: Anshul Sinha
- Written by: Anshul Sinha
- Produced by: crowd-fund (Campaign Head - Dinesh Chandrasekhar)
- Starring: Anumeha Rai
- Music by: P.V.R. Raja
- Release date: 26 January 2018
- Running time: 120 minutes
- Country: India
- Language: Hindi

Mitti: Back to roots is a 2018 Indian Hindi-language crowd-funded feature film written and directed by Anshul Sinha starring Anumeha Rai. The music was composed by P.V.R. Raja.

== Plot ==
The film follows Ekta Singh, an agricultural scientist, who tries to investigate about farmer suicides and the agrarian crisis including 27 major issues of farmers and provide practical solutions.

== Cast ==
Adapted from the film's end credits:

- Anumeha Rai as Ekta Singh
- Subhash Gupta as the senior scientist
- Sandeep Yadav as Madhav
- Harischandra Rayala as Ishwar Kaka
- Abhinay Shukla as Shambu
- Pushpent Pant as Pandey
- Ratnashekar as Ekta's father
- Padmavathy as Ekta's mother
- Soni as Teen Ekta
- Satyavaani as Kaki / Janaki
- Sakshi Malhotra as Laxmi
- Suhani Sharma as Vyjyanti
- Rohit Chauhan as Rishi

== Production ==
To prepare for the film, Anshul Sinha visited 250 villages including the organic Enabavi village and researched their hardships for eight months. Sinha's research involved the agrian crisis of four states: Andhra Pradesh, Telangana, Maharashtra and Punjab.

== Release ==
Prior to the film's direct release on YouTube, the film was screened at educational, urban centres and rural areas in an attempt to bring light to the dire situation of Indian farmers.
