= Madhi (2022 film) =

- Directed by: Naga Dhanush
- Written by: Naga Dhanush
- Produced by: Ram Kishan
- Starring: Sreeram Nimmala, Richa Joshi
- Cinematography: Vijay Tagore
- Edited by: Pradeep Jambiga
- Music by: P.V.R. Raja
- Release date: 11 November 2022
- Country: India
- Language: Telugu

Madhi (lit. 'The Mind') is a 2022 Indian Telugu-language romantic drama film written and directed by Naga Dhanush and produced by Ram Kishan for Pragathi Pictures. The film features Sreeram Nimmala, Richa Joshi in lead roles with Sneha Madhuri Sharma, Srikanth Biroju and Yogi Khatri in pivotal roles. The music and background score was composed by P.V.R. Raja.

== Plot ==
Madhu and Abhi live in the neighboring houses, both of them not belong to the same caste, Madhu's father disapproves of their love and Madhu's marriage is arranged with someone else. Later, abhi unable to stay away from madhu, they meet occasionally, and as Madhu moves away, Abhi gets very sad, and finally Abhi leaves the world.

== Cast ==
- Sreeram Nimmala as Abhi
- Richa Joshi as Madhu

== Soundtrack ==
Madhi

Soundtrack album by P.V.R. Raja
- Released: 2022
- Recorded: 2021
- Genre: Feature film soundtrack
- Length: 14:26
- Language: Telugu
- Label: Aditya Music
- Producer: P.V.R. Raja

P.V.R. Raja chronology
Vitamin She (2020 film)	Madhi
External audio
- Audio Jukebox on YouTube

The film score and soundtrack album of the film are composed by P.V.R. Raja.

Track list
No.	Title	Lyrics	Singer(s)	Length
1.	"Kavvinche Kalavu"	Kadali	Ramya Behara, Sai Charan	2:50
2.	"Pranayam"	Purnachary	Sai Charan, Harini Ivaturi	3:45
3.	"Sirimallave DJ Song"	Naga Dhanush	Raghu Kunche	1:45
4.	"Soul Of Madhi"	Kadali	Sunitha, Deepu	2:58
5.	"Maruvana"	Kadali	Dinakar	3:08
Total length:				14:26

== Release ==
The film was released on 11 November 2022.
