= Mangala Stadium =

Athletics stadium in Mangaluru, Karnataka, India

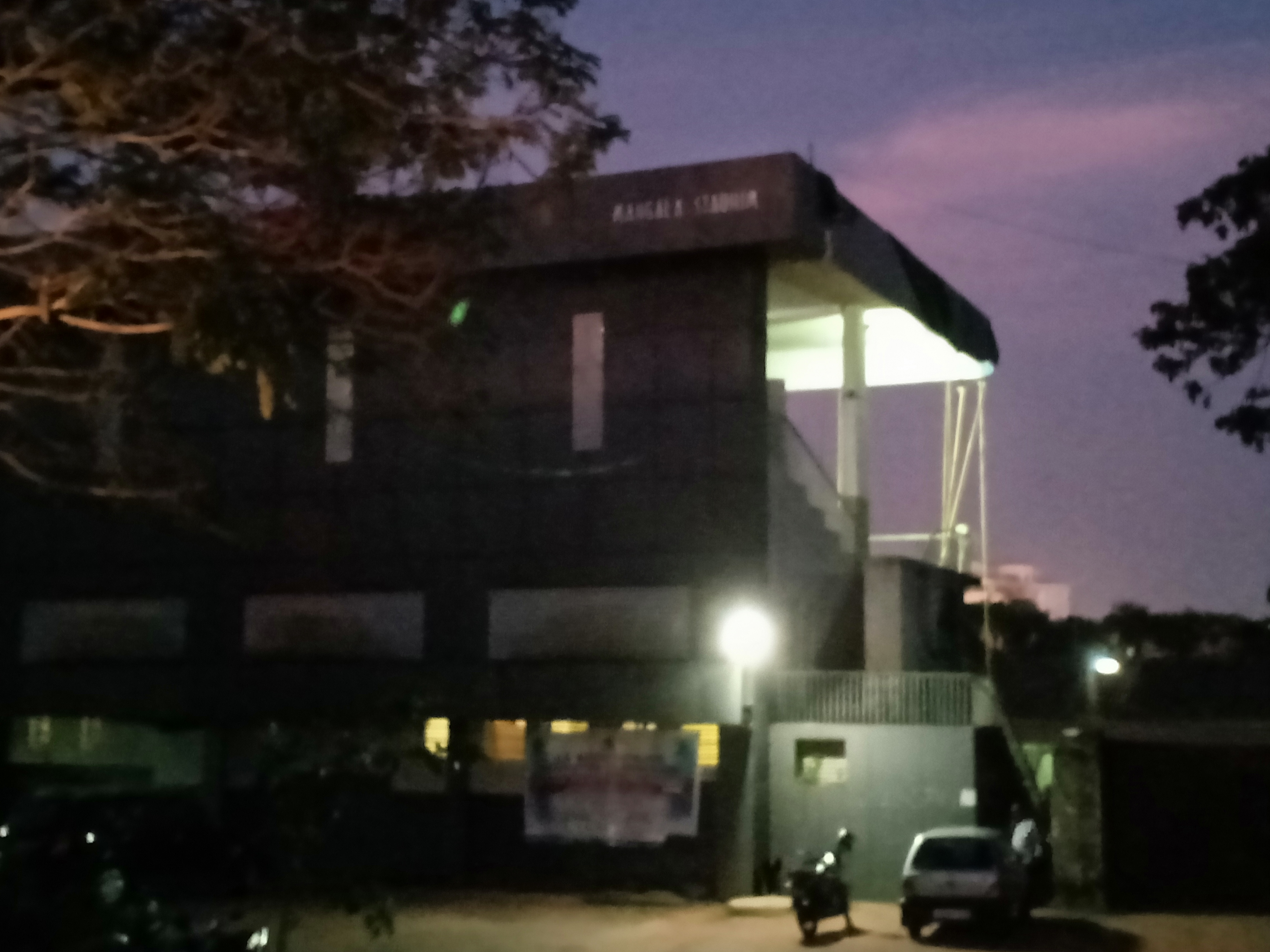
- Near the entrance of Mangala Stadium in Mangalore
- Location: Mangaluru, Karnataka
- Owner: Mangaluru City Corporation
- Operator: Mangaluru City Corporation
- Capacity: 8,000

Construction
- Groundbreaking: 2009
- Opened: October 2011

Tenants
- Karnataka cricket team, Mangalore United; South United F.C.(2018-Present )

The Mangala Stadium is a public sports and athletics stadium located in the heart of Mangaluru, Karnataka, India, managed by Karnataka State Department of Youth Affairs and Sports. The term Mangala Stadium also refers to the various sports facilities adjacent to the stadium, which includes a swimming pool and a gymnasium. There is vacant ground adjoining the stadium which is used for various sporting as well as non-sports related events such as trade fairs, carnivals, commercial expositions and other cultural events.

== History ==
The stadium is at least 30 years old, and over the course of time it has become a centre for athletic activity in Mangaluru.

== Facilities ==
There are facilities for major track events such as a running track, long jump, shot put, javelin and a hammer-throw cage. Adjacent to the stadium is the swimming pool with five lanes.

The stadium is set to get a full-fledged synthetic track with the Dakshina Kannada district administration favourably responding to demands from the athletes to provide facilities on either side of the track.

The Rs. 3.15-crore project, awarded through tender, had been secured by the Delhi-based sports infrastructure company Syncotts International. This will enable the stadium to conduct sporting events on a larger scale. The company, which was expected to begin work on 7 January, has been given three months to complete the upgrade of the existing cinder track to a synthetic one, with an additional fifteen days to provide the facilities for pole vault, javelin throw, hammer throw, discus throw, and shot put and steeple chase events in the D area.this track was opened by cm of karnataka on 18 March 2013.

Mangala stadium has a seating capacity of approximately 8,000 capacity currently.

== Other uses ==
The stadium was recently used for hosting the 17th National Youth Festival (India) organised by the Department of Youth Affairs, Ministry of Youth Affairs and Sports, Government of India in collaboration with the Nehru Yuva Kendra Sangathan (NYKS) and National Service Scheme (NSS).

== See also ==
- U S Mallya Indoor Stadium
