= Black (2022 film) =

- Directed by: GB Krishna
- Written by: GB Krishna
- Produced by: Mahankali Diwakar
- Starring: Aadi Saikumar; Darshana Banik
- Cinematography: Satish Muthyala
- Edited by: Amar Reddy
- Music by: Songs: Suresh Bobbili; Score: P.V.R. Raja
- Release date: 28 May 2022
- Running time: 138 minutes
- Country: India
- Language: Telugu

Black is a 2022 Indian Telugu-language crime action thriller film written and directed by GB Krishna and produced by Mahankali Diwakar for Mahankali Movies. The film features Aadi Sai Kumar and Darshana Banik in lead roles with Kaushal Manda, Aamani, Prudhvi Raj and Thagubothu Ramesh in pivotal roles. Songs and background score are composed by Suresh Bobbili and P.V.R. Raja, respectively.

== Plot ==
Aditya and Arjun are twins, Constable Vikramaditya Dharmaraj also known as Aditya becomes a policeman as per his father's wish. Arjun is attracted to Radhaki and falls in love with her. Meanwhile, Arjun accidentally gets involved in a mysterious robbery and murder case. As the investigation takes a new turn with the entry of the new boss Vihan Varma Sub- Inspector of Police, Aditya finds out shocking secrets related to his past.

== Cast ==
- Aadi Saikumar as Constable Vikramaditya "Aditya" Dharmaraj
- Darshana Banik as Haanika
- Kaushal Manda as Vihan Varma
- Aamani as Aditya's Mother
- Prudhvi Raj
- Thagubothu Ramesh
- Satyam Rajesh

== Soundtrack ==
Black

Film score by Suresh Bobbili
- Released: 2022
- Recorded: 2022
- Genre: Feature film soundtrack
- Length: 3:33
- Language: Telugu
- Label: Aditya Music
- Producer: Suresh Bobbili
External audio
- EP on Spotify

Music composed by Suresh Bobbili

Track list
No.	Title	Lyrics	Singer(s)	Length
1.	"Naa Guppedantha"	Purna Chari	Suresh Bobbili, Ishaq Vali	3:33
Total length:				3:33

== Release ==
The film was released on 28 May 2022.

== Critical reception ==
The film received 2.75 stars out of five in a review by The Times of India, a rating of 2 out of five from NTV Telugu, and a rating of 1.5 out of five from ABP Desam.
