= Jandhyala Rasina Prema Katha =

- Directed by: Krishna Varma
- Produced by: Manegunta Karthik Reddy; Ashok Siriyala
- Starring: Dileep; Sekhar; Srilakshmi; Gayatri Gupta
- Cinematography: Ratna Babu
- Edited by: Narasimha Reddy
- Music by: P.V.R. Raja; Gopi
- Production company: Keerthi Creations
- Release date: 24 November 2017
- Country: India
- Language: Telugu

Jandhyala Rasina Prema Katha (transl. Jandhyala's written love story) is a 2017 Indian Telugu-language romantic drama film directed by Krishna Varma and produced by Manegunta Karthik Reddy and Ashok Siriyala for Keerthi Creations. The film features Sekhar, Srilakshni and Gayatri Gupta in lead roles. The music and background score was composed by P.V.R. Raja and Gopi. It is a remake of Nalugu Stambhalata (1982) directed by Jandhyala.

== Plot ==
Different people from different backgrounds embark on a journey to discover what love means to them and how to deal with it. The gist of this film is how their lives have turned around due to the situations they face in this journey.

== Cast ==
- Sekhar as Vamsi
- Dileep as Ram
- Srilakshmi as Pavithara
- Gayatri Gupta as Chithra

== Soundtrack ==
Jandhyala Rasina Prema Katha

Soundtrack album by P.V.R. Raja Gopi
- Released: 2017
- Recorded: 2017
- Genre: Feature film soundtrack
- Length: 14:26
- Language: Telugu
- Label: Aditya Music
- Producer: P.V.R. Raja, Gopi

P.V.R. Raja chronology
Jandhyala Rasina Prema Katha	Vitamin She (2020 film)
External audio
- EP on Spotify

The film score and soundtrack album of the film are composed by Gopi and P.V.R. Raja.

Track listing
No.	Title	Lyrics	Music	Singer(s)	Length
1.	"Neeve"	Sreemani	Gopi	Raghuram, Mounika Reddy	4:29
2.	"Choodavera"	Varikuppala Yadagiri	Gopi	Ashwini	3:30
3.	"Ghathagyapakala"	M. M. Keeravani	P.V.R. Raja	Deepak Blue	1:24
4.	"Sye Sarigamalo"	Chaitanya Prasad	Gopi	Laxmi	3:14
5.	"Reppapatulo"	Lipsika	P.V.R. Raja	Krishna	2:09
6.	"Gulebakavali"	Ramajogayya Sastry	Gopi	Abhinay	1:59
Total length:					16:47

== Release ==
The film was released on 24 November 2017.
