= NES Ratnam College Of Arts, Science & Commerce =

- Motto in English: Learn, Live & Lead
- Type: Co-education
- Established: 1983; 43 years ago
- Founder: Dr. R. Varadarajan
- Accreditation: NAAC "A" GRADE (4th Cycle)
- Affiliations: Mumbai University; Maharashtra Board
- Principal: Dr. Vinita Dhulia
- Director: Dr. Balasubramanian. V
- Students: 6000+
- Location: Bhandup, Mumbai, Maharashtra, India; 19.0412525°N 72.8612799°E
- Campus: NES Complex, Bhandup
- Website: www.ratnamcollege.edu.in//

NES Ratnam College of Arts, Science, and Commerce is an educational institution located in Bhandup, Mumbai, Maharashtra. Founded in 1983 by the National Education Society, the college provides a comprehensive range of undergraduate and postgraduate programs. Affiliated with the University of Mumbai, it holds an "A" grade accreditation from the National Assessment and Accreditation Council (NAAC) in its fourth assessment cycle.

== History ==
NES Ratnam College of Arts, Science and Commerce is a college in Bhandup, Mumbai, India, owned and managed by the National Education Society and established in the year 1983. The College is named in memory of the late mother of its Founder-President whom he lost at the age of one.

== Courses ==
=== Junior college (MSBSHSE) ===
- F.Y.J.C Science
- S.Y.J.C Science

=== UG Courses ===
- Bachelor of Arts
- Bachelor of Commerce
- Bachelor of Science
- Bachelor of Management Studies
- Bachelor of Accounts and Finance
- Bachelor of Banking and Insurance
- Bachelor of Science in Information Technology

== Master’s Programme ==
- Commerce
- Physics
- Microbiology
- Organic Chemistry
- Inorganic Chemistry
- Biochemistry
- Computer Science
- Information Technology
- Botany
- Zoology
- Bio-Technology

== Master's programme by research ==
- Chemistry
- Biochemistry
- Microbiology
- Botany
- Zoology

== Doctoral programmes ==
- Zoology

== Autonomous Courses ==
- PG Diploma in Counselling
- PG Diploma in Special Education (Autonomous)
- PG Diploma in Early Childhood Education (Autonomous)
- PG Diploma in Guidance and Counselling (Autonomous)
