= Rupali Repale =

Indian swimmer and triathlete

Sagar Kanya Rupali Repale
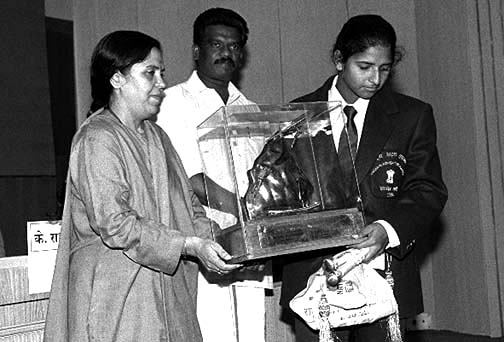
- Repale receiving National Adventure Award at the hands of Hon. Uma Bharti, New Delhi 1999.
- Born: 3 February 1982 (age 44); Mumbai, Maharashtra, India
- Occupations: Swimmer; Triathlete; Entrepreneur, Chairperson of Rupali Industries
- Relatives: Vishal Hinge (Spouse), Swaraj Hinge (Son), Hindavi Hinge (daughter)
- Website: rupalirepale.com/about-us/

Rupali Ramdas Repale (born 3 February 1982 in Mumbai), is an Indian open-water long-distance swimmer and triathlete. She swam the English Channel in the solo swim category on 15 August 1994 in a time span of 16 hours and 7 minutes, making her the youngest successful swimmer (12 years old) to cross the English Channel for the year 1994. She swam a total of seven straits during the course of her swimming career, Gibraltar Strait, Palk Strait, Bass Strait, Cook Strait, Robben Island Channel and Mumbai-Dharamtar Channel.

== Early life and background ==
Rupali Repale was born in Mumbai, the daughter of Ramdas Repale and Rekha Repale, who were small-scale business owners from a modest financial background. Born in rural Pune, both the parents moved to Mumbai city in 1970s shortly before their marriage and settled in Bhandup, a suburb of Mumbai. Rupali completed her schooling at Bright High School & Junior College Bhandup-(west) and went on to graduate with a degree in sociology from Mumbai University.
Rupali started swimming at an early age and soon developed a penchant for it. She showed remarkable stamina even at an early age and could swim for hours at a stretch. Noticed by her coaches and later backed by her father, she soon started training for long-distance events and later in the open waters. Apart from swimming, she also participates in Triathlon events and has achieved many accolades in it as well.

== Swimming career ==
- 1994: English Channel, England to France, 34 kilometers in 16 hours and 7 minutes. Youngest Swimmer for the year 1994.
- 1994: Gibraltar Strait, Spain to Morocco, 28 kilometers in 5 hours and 5 minutes.
- 1995: Mumbai to Dharamtar two-way Gateway of India swim, 72 kilometers in 21 hours and 30 minutes.
- 1995: Sri Lanka to India, 40 kilometers in 11 hours and 5 minutes.
- 1996: Bass Strait, Phillip Bay to Melbourne, 65 kilometers in 17 hours, required swimming within the confines of a cage due to the shark-infested nature of the strait.
- 1998: Cook Strait, Pegano Head to Waipiro Bay (New Zealand), 80 kilometers in 19 hours 44 minutes, record for the longest successful swim in first attempt
- 2000: Three Anchor Bay to Robben Island (South Africa) two-way. 30 kilometers in 7 hrs.

== Awards and honors ==
- National Youth Award awarded by then President of India late Hon. Shankar Dayal Sharma, Bhopal 1995.
- Tenzing Norgay National Adventure Award awarded by then Minister of Youth Affairs and Sports (India) Hon. Uma Bharti, New Delhi 1999.
- HIMA Foundation Award awarded by then Governor of Maharashtra late Hon. Dr. P C Alexander, Mumbai 1995.
- Sagar Kanya title conferred upon by the Government of Maharashtra.
- Dolphin Queen title conferred upon by the Government of New Zealand.

== Present activities ==
Rupali is the founder and director of Rupali Industries, a water purification based home appliance company. In her spare time she likes to coach young talent at local swimming pools.

== Books on Rupali ==
- Biographical book Jal Akramile (Marathi) written by Sumedh Vadavala and published by Rajhans Prakashans.
- Excerpt from Rupali's book is included in the Maharashtra state school curriculum to encourage youth involvement in sports.
