= National Youth Festival (India) =

Annual youth gathering in January

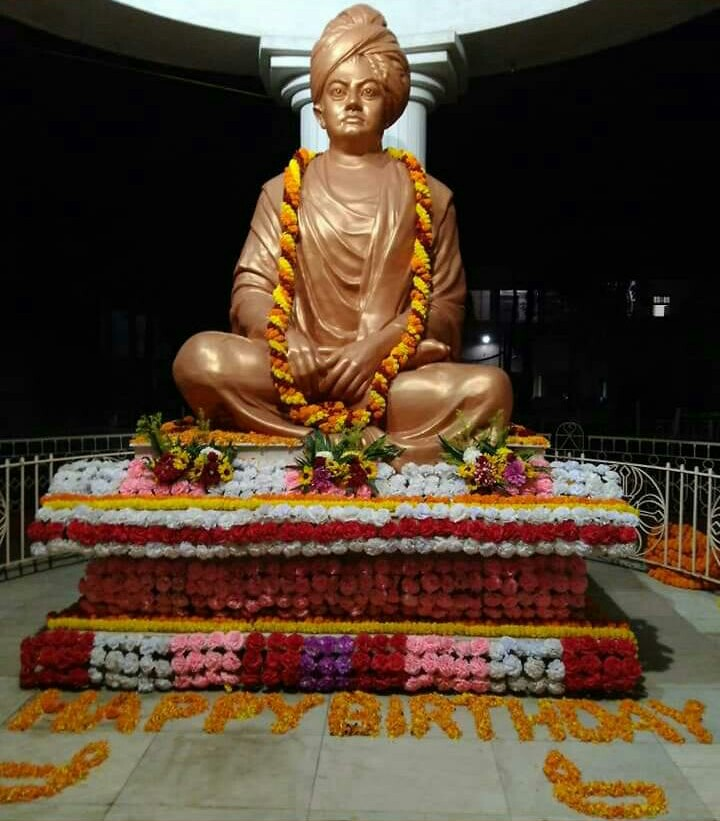
Celebration of Swami Vivekananda's 156th birthday at Baranagar Ramakrishna Mission in West Bengal, India on 12 January 2019

The National Youth Festival in India is an annual gathering of youth with various competitive and collaborative activities. Celebrated to commemorate the birth anniversary of youth icon Swami Vivekananda, it is organized by Ministry of Youth Affairs and Sports, Government of India in collaboration with one of the state governments. It is held in a different state each year during National Youth Week, 12–16 January every year.

== Background ==
Swami Vivekananda's birthday on January 12 is always celebrated as National Youth Day and the week commencing from that day is known as the National Youth Week. As part of National Youth Week celebrations, the Government of India holds the National Youth Festival every year. This is an event of the Ministry of Youth Affairs and Sports, Government of India and is celebrated annually in one of the States in a joint venture. The youth festival aims to propagate the concept of national integration, spirit of communal harmony, brotherhood, courage and adventure by exhibiting their cultural prowess in a common platform. This is done by organizing gatherings of youth across the country and encouraging them to take part in different activities.National Youth Day (India)

Competitive events are a main part of the festival. To compete at the national level, contestants outperform the rest, obtaining medals and awards. To conduct these competitions, eighteen in all disciplines, a team of officers was deployed that managed the competitions, helped in creating logistical arrangements for smooth conduct of competitions, and collected and collated the results.

The activities held during the festival include competitive and non-competitive cultural events, martial arts, exhibitions, intellectual discourses, young artists camps, seminars and adventure Programmes. The presentation of National Youth Awards also takes place.

== Objective ==
The National Youth Festival began in 1995 as a major activity under the Programme of National Integration Camp (NIC). In collaboration with one of the States and institutions like Nehru Yuva Kendra Sangathan (NYKS) and the National Service Scheme (NSS), the Government of India conducts this Programme every year. Like the National Youth Festival, States are also encouraged to hold state level, district level and block level youth festivals in the same format as that of the National Youth Festival. The Centre of the festival focuses on cultural aspects and a number of other Programmes covering a wide variety of activities, which not only reflect the spirit of friendship but also peace and development. Besides all this, this festival provides a nationwide exposure to the youth for the expression and fulfillment of their cultural talents and aspirations.

== 2010 ==
Orissa hosted for the first time the 15th National Youth Festival in Bhubaneswar from 8 to 12 January 2010.This was the 15th year in which Orissa State celebrated this event. This was celebrated in collaboration with the Government of India under with various state and national groups like NSS etc.

=== Program Venues ===
The participants from across the country were around 6,000 coming from all states and union territories.

- For cultural activities - 100 per state/ UT
- For the exhibition to showcase each State products - 40 per state/ UT
- For the young artist camp (artistic work and painting) - 10 per state /UT
- National youth awardees – 30
- Judges for conduct of events - 60
- Suvichar (seminar) /intellectual invitees - 100
- Event conducting officials – 500
- VIPs and celebrities, including secretaries and directors of different states
- Folk dances
- Classical dances
- One act play
- Classical vocal solo
- Folk song
- Classical instrumental solo

==== Non-competitive ====
- Folk dance
- elocution
- Hasya Kavi Samillani show omg
- Rock show
- Special cultural evening
- Martial Arts

==== Other events ====
- Yuva Kirtti
- Food festival
- Youth convention
- Suvichar
- Young artist camp
- Adventure sports

=== Logo/Mascot/Theme of the festival ===
The Logo/Mascot and Theme were approved on 30 November 2009 at the National Steering Committee Meeting for NYF-2010 held in New Delhi with Hon’ble Union Minister of Youth Affairs and Sports, Mr MS Gill and Hon’ble Chief Minister, Mr Naveen Patnaik, Orissa, Government of India.

==== Logo ====
The logo of the festival depicts six active and stylised youth, portraying the “unity in diversity” of India. It uses various colour shades to suggest the multi-hued cultural facet of India and symbolizes the theme ‘Celebrating Diversity’.

==== Mascot ====
Gori, India's 34-year-old rare white crocodile has been chosen as the mascot for the festival. India's this captive albino crocodile Gori, bred and reared in a pen within Bhitarkanika Wildlife Sanctuary in Kendrapara, had become a sort of cynosure for wildlife experts.

==== Theme ====
“Celebrating Diversity” was accepted as the theme of the festival.

=== Ceremonies ===
==== Inaugural ceremony ====
The opening ceremony of the 15th National Youth Festival in Bhubaneswar was attended by Hon’ble Union Minister for Youth Affairs and Sports, Hon’ble Union Minister of State for Youth Affairs and Sports, Government of India in presence of Hon’ble Chief Minister, Orissa and Hon’ble Minister, Sports, YS and Revenue, and other Hon’ble Ministers of Orissa at Kalinga Stadium sports complex on 8th Jan-2010 at 3 PM. More than five thousand police officers and hundreds of state government officials had been deployed. An Indian Air Force helicopter showering flower petals and carrying the logo of the event followed by Akash Ganga formation over the main festival venue took place. The event also included a dare devil display by the Indian Army, a cultural march past, a fusion dance of Odissi/ Gotipua / Ranappa, Ghumra dance, a crocodile dance and a laser show. Young artists from across the country performed diverse forms of classical and folk dances on the opening day of the Youth Festival.

==== Closing ceremony ====
The event ended on the evening of January 12 after the National Anthem and fireworks. The closing ceremony started after the Surya Kiran Show by the Indian Air Force and a cultural display by the Event Management. The ceremony was marked by an aerobatic show by the Indian Air Force, Chhau Dance, a Malkhamba presentation, Beating the Retreat by the Ceremonial Band of the Indian Navy, a dance show by Prince Dance Group and fireworks. The aerobatic show by the IAF personnel was viewed by a crowd of over 50,000 people in the stadium. The sky divers drifted down from a height of thousands of feet to land in the middle of the stadium. A march past by the state contingents Hum Yuba was followed by an address by the Minister of State Sports and Youth Services, Praveen Chandra Bhanj Deo. There followed an address by the celebrity guest Vijendra Singh, a bronze medallist in boxing at the Olympic Games in Beijing 2008 and then an address by the Union Minister of State Youth Affairs and Sports Pratik Prakashbapu Patil. The Chief Minister Naveen Patnaik released a souvenir and distributed the prizes and medals to the winners of the various competitions held during the past five days. He said that the festival demonstrated India's unity in diversity. The Commissioner cum Secretary, Sports and Youth Services P.K. Mohapatra proposed the vote of thanks and the Chief Minister announced the close of 15th National Youth Festival 2010. Finally, a ceremonial band of the Indian Navy performed 'Beating the Retreat'.

== 2011 ==
The 16th National Youth Festival was held in Udaipur, Rajasthan. Udaipur hosted the expected 5000 participants from all 35 states and union territories. Apart from the young enthusiasts and many government officials, the City of Lakes, for the first time in any NYF, was graced by the presence of foreign delegations from ASEAN and SAARC. The event, with the theme 'Sabse Pehle Bharat', comprised competitive cultural events including folk & classical dances, one act plays, and numerous non-competitive events.

=== Events ===
The events aimed at inculcating qualities and attributes like teamwork and leadership among the participants. The various performances and competitive events were

Classical Dances:

- Bharat Natyam
- Kathak
- Kuchipudi
- Manipuri
- Odissi

Classical Instrumental Solos:

- Flute
- Guitar
- Mridangam
- Sitar
- Tabla
- Veena

Other Events:

- Folk Dance
- Folk Song
- One-Act Play
- Hindustani Vocal Solo
- Carnatic Vocal Solo
- Harmonium (Light)
- Elocution (Extempore)
- Painting
- Sculpture
- Photography

=== Logo ===
The logo illustrates the initials of the festival name as a graphical pneumonic with abundant usage of vibrant colours along with Rajasthani motifs exhibiting the cultural touch associated with the event. The 'n' 'y' 'f' formed in the logo carried the advantage of registering a graphical recognition for the festival with a high recall value conveying its significance amongst the people.

=== Mascot ===
The chosen mascot for the NYF 2011 conveyed all the attributes associated with the annual occasion celebrated. Named as Teengur, the mascot was a fun-loving & an enthusiastic tiger wearing a Rajasthani 'pagri'.

== 2012 ==
The 17th National Youth Festival was held in Mangalore, Karnataka. Mangalore hosted the expected 5000 participants from all 35 states and union territories of India. The event, with the theme "Celebrating Diversity In Unity", comprised competitive cultural events including folk & classical dances, one act plays, and numerous non-competitive events.

=== Mascot ===
Yakshi was the mascot for the 17th National Youth Festival 2012 being held from January 12 to 16 in Mangalore. Yakshi is an elephant, the heritage animal of India, adorned with the traditional Mangalorean Yakshagana headgear.

=== Events ===
The events aimed at inculcating qualities and attributes like teamwork and leadership among the participants.2222015 The various performances and competitive events were

Classical Dances:

- Bharat Natyam
- Kathak
- Kuchipudi
- Manipuri
- Odissi

Classical Instrumental Solos:

- Flute
- Guitar
- Mridangam
- Sitar
- Tabla
- Veena

Other Events:

- Folk Dance
- Folk Song
- One-Act Play
- Hindustani Vocal Solo
- Carnatic Vocal Solo
- Harmonium (Light)
- Elocution (Extempore)
- Painting
- Sculpture
- Photography
- Adventure Events
- Yuva Kriti
- Food Festival
- Suvichar - Youth Convention

=== Venues ===
The venues for the various events included:

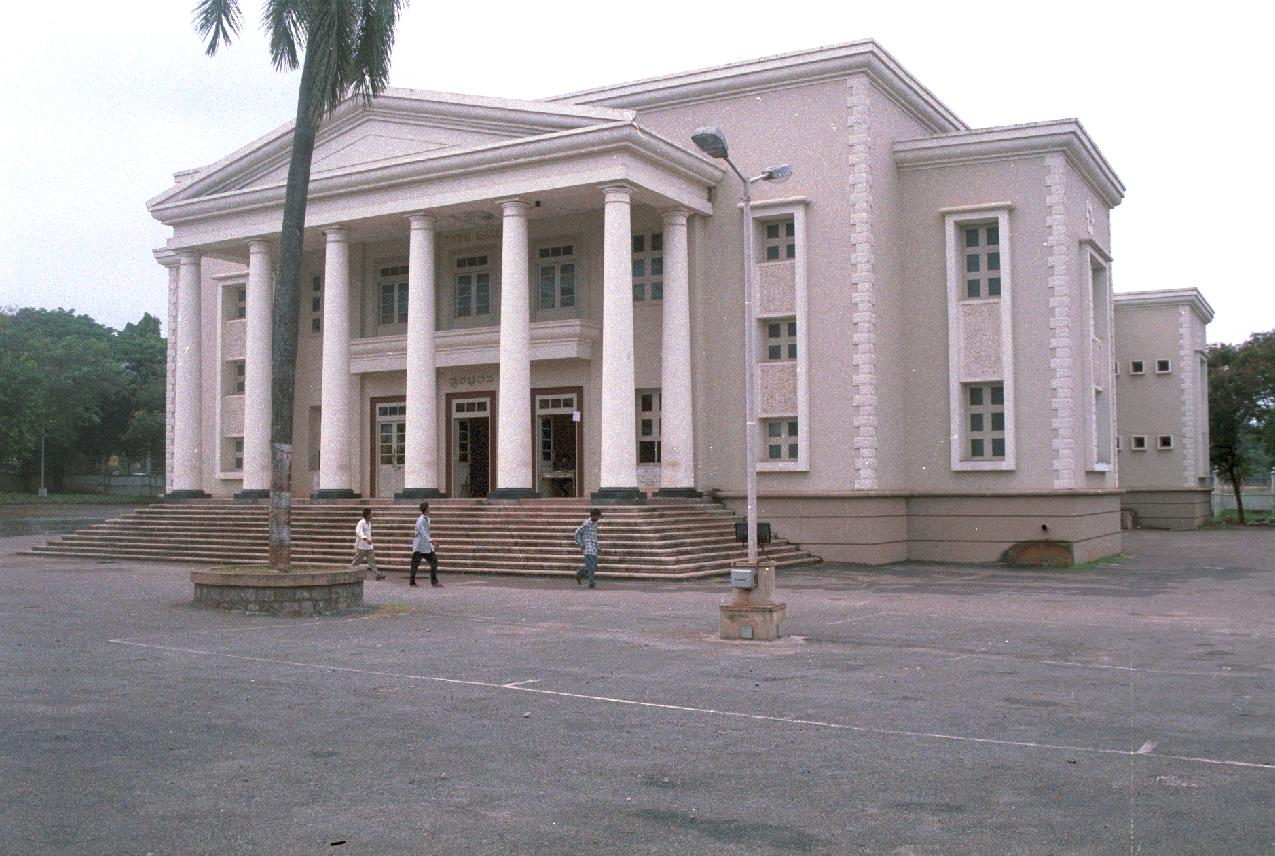
Town Hall, Mangalore

- TMA Pai Conventional Hall, Kodialbail
- Town Hall, Hampankatta
- Gokarnanatheshwara Hall, Kudroli
- Koragappa Kalyana Mantap, Kudroli
- Devadiga Bhavan, Mannagudda
- SDM Law College, Kodialbail
- Loyala Hall, St. Aloysius College
- Mangala Stadium

== 2013 ==
Bihar is hosting National Youth Festival, second time in seven years, in January 2013. The five-day festival will be held from January 12 to 16 in Patna. The first festival was held here in 2006 soon after the Nitish Kumar led government took over.

== 2016 ==
The 20th National Youth Festival was held in the state of Chhattisgarh. It took place in the city named "Naya Raipur".

The theme for the National Youth Festival 2016 was 'India Youth for Skill, Development and Harmony' Over 6000 participants from across the country participated in the National Youth Festival 2016 For the first time in the youth festival, para-trooping was displayed by Indian Army, while weapons and explosives used during war were put on exhibition.

== 2017 ==
The National Youth Festival 2017 is organized by the Government of Haryana in collaboration with the Ministry of Youth Affairs and Sports, Government of India. The theme for the current festival is 'Youth for Digital India'. The festival will be attended by over 10000 youth from across the country. The event will be kickstarted with a grand opening ceremony with a theme song and live address. There will be cultural performances by youth representing each state and UT. There will be special events to celebrate the birth anniversary of Swami Vivekananda, who has been a great source of inspiration for the youth of the nation. The festival will also host a 'National youth convention' to connect and inspire with motivational and inspirational talks by select youth icons and youth achievers. There will be celebrity performances and acts highlighting the rich culture and heritage of the Haryana state

== 2018 ==
Jaipur and kooda

== 2019/2020 ==
Lucknow

Yogi adityanath was the chief guest at the opening ceremony of the program.

== 2023 ==
The 26th National Youth Festival was held in Dharwad, Karnataka. Dharwad hosted the fest and had 8000 delegates from all over the country and union territories of India. The theme of the event was Viksit Yuva – Viksit Bharat.

=== Mascot ===
Champi Chikka was the mascot for the 26th national Youth Festival. It was described as "The Mascot is energetic image of Champi Chikka, which translates to Young Champion. It represents the image of a young and modern India championing various global causes such as Climate Change, SDGs and Global Peace. It also showcases Indias youth champions excelling at various sectors such as Start-ups, Sports, Innovation and Education. The national flower, lotus, was the official logo for the event selected through a competition.

=== Events ===
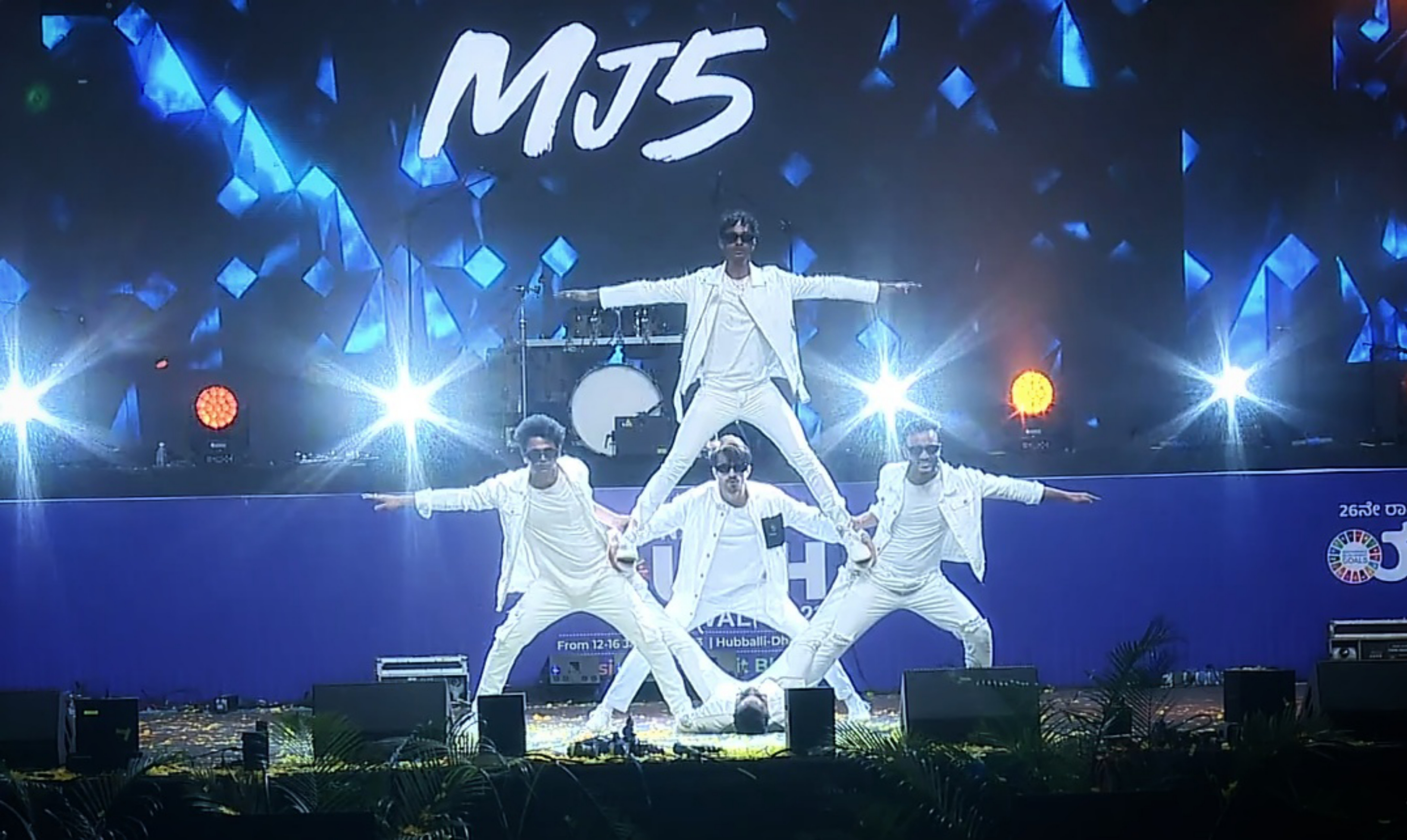
MJ5 dance group performing at KCD Dharwad during 26th NYF

The events included

Classical Dances:

- Bharat Natyam
- Kathak
- Manipuri
- Odissi
- Ojapali

Classical Instrumental Solos:

- Flute
- Guitar
- Sitar
- Tabla
- Veena

Other Events:

- Cello
- Folk Dance
- Folk Song
- Hindustani
- Carnatic
- Harmonium (Light)
- Laser show
- Painting
- Sculpture
- Adventure Events
- Yuva Kriti
- Food Festival

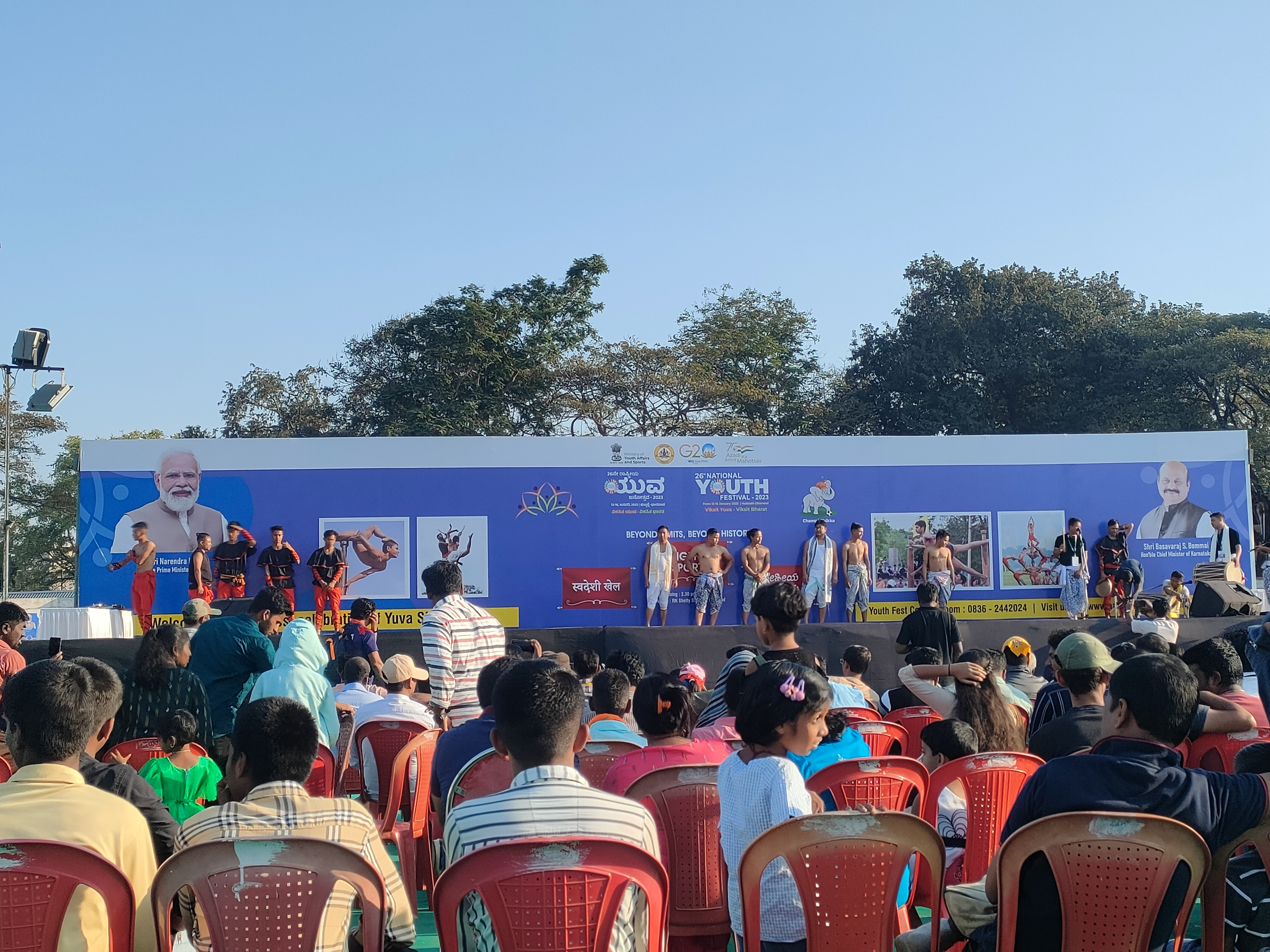
Indigenous sports

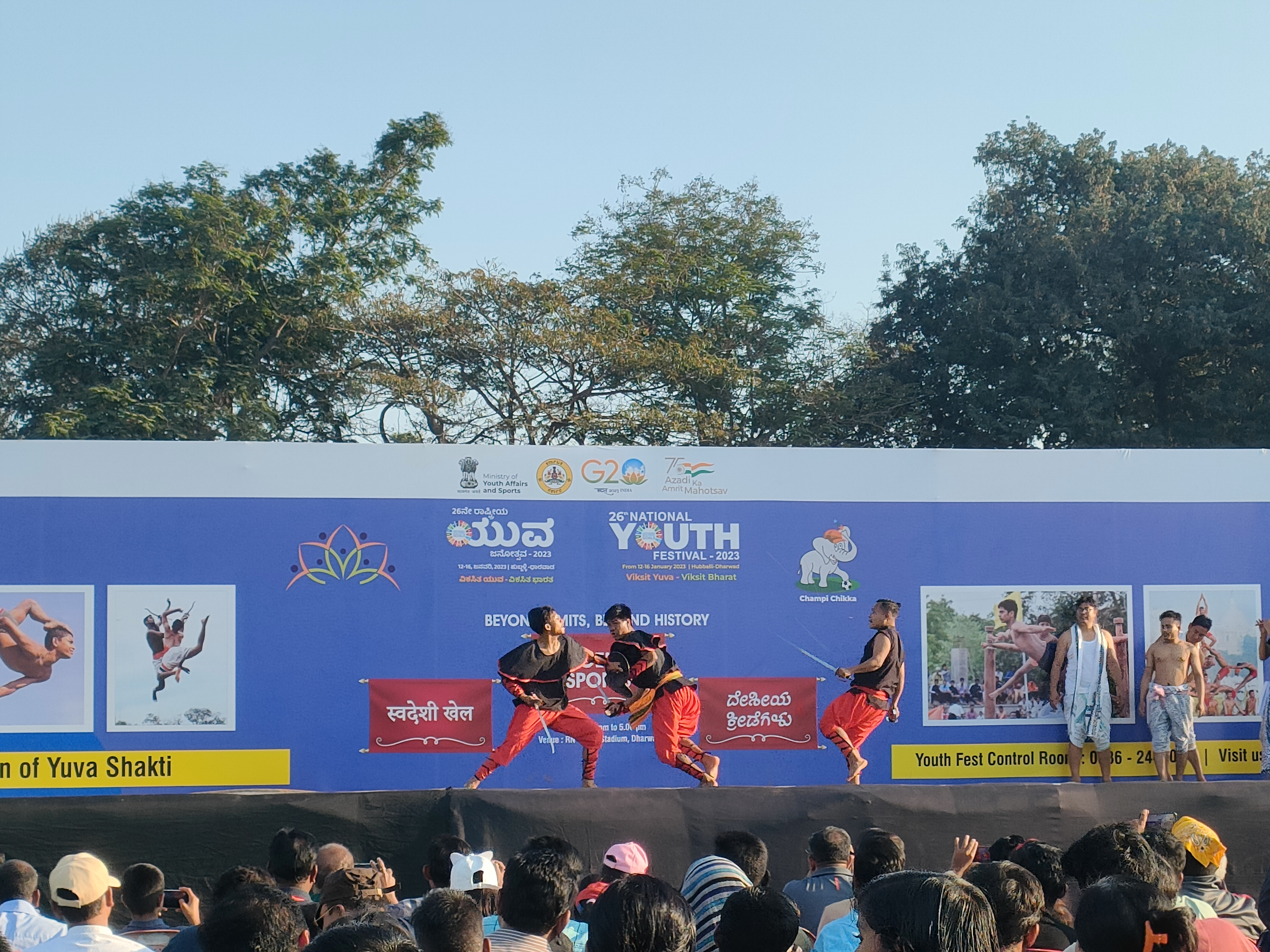
Indigenous sports

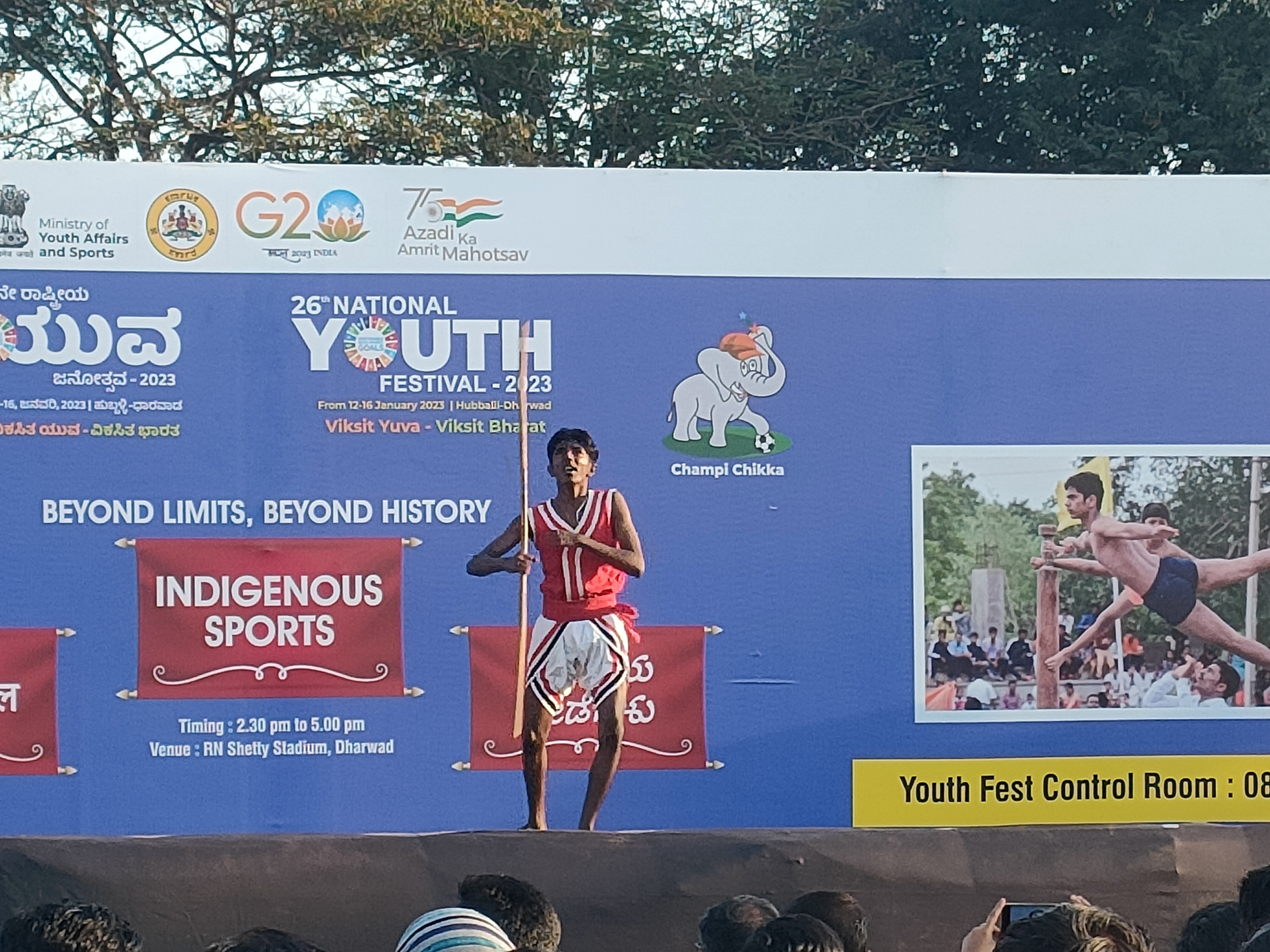
Kolthari

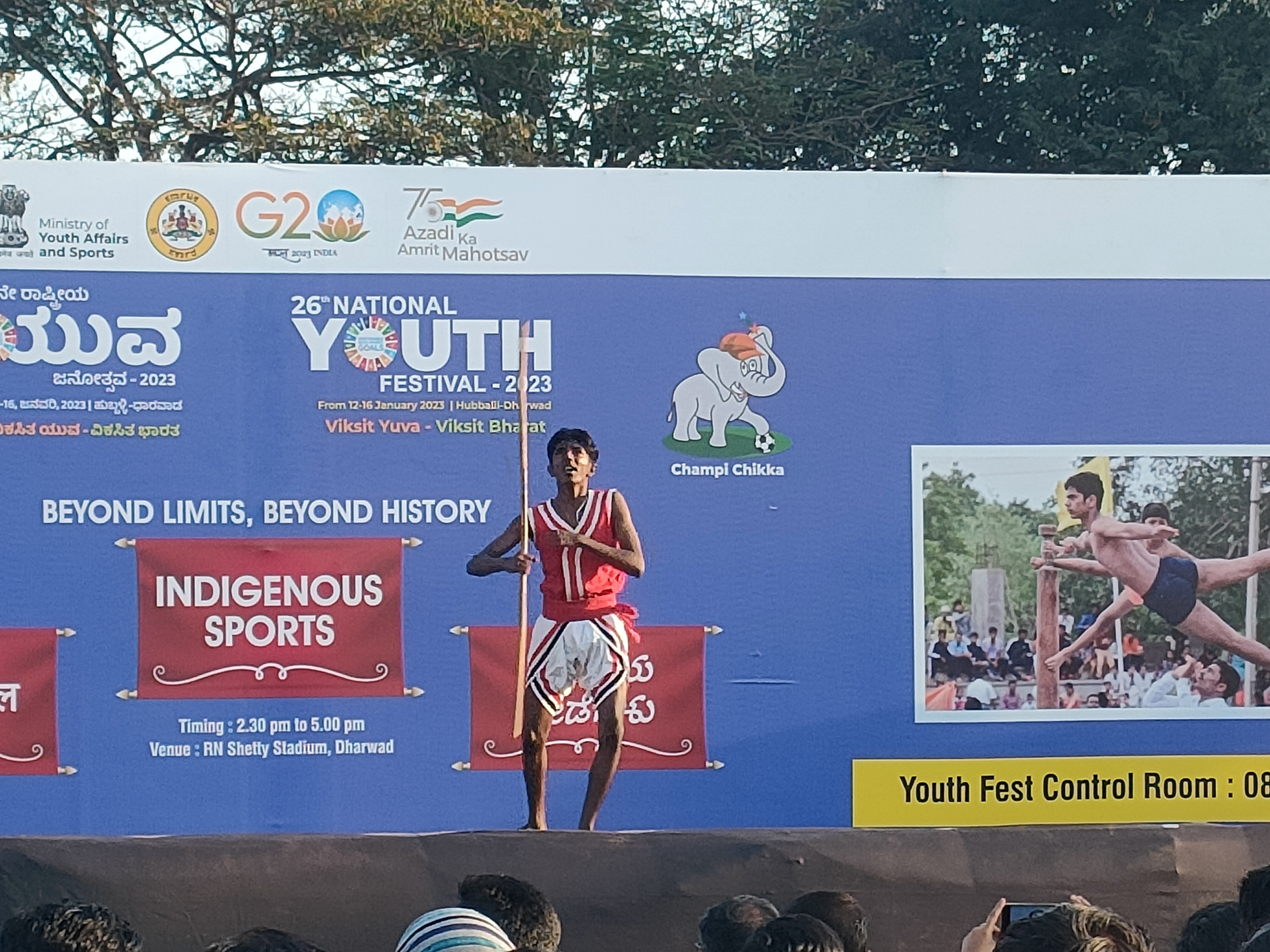
Kolthari

=== Venues ===
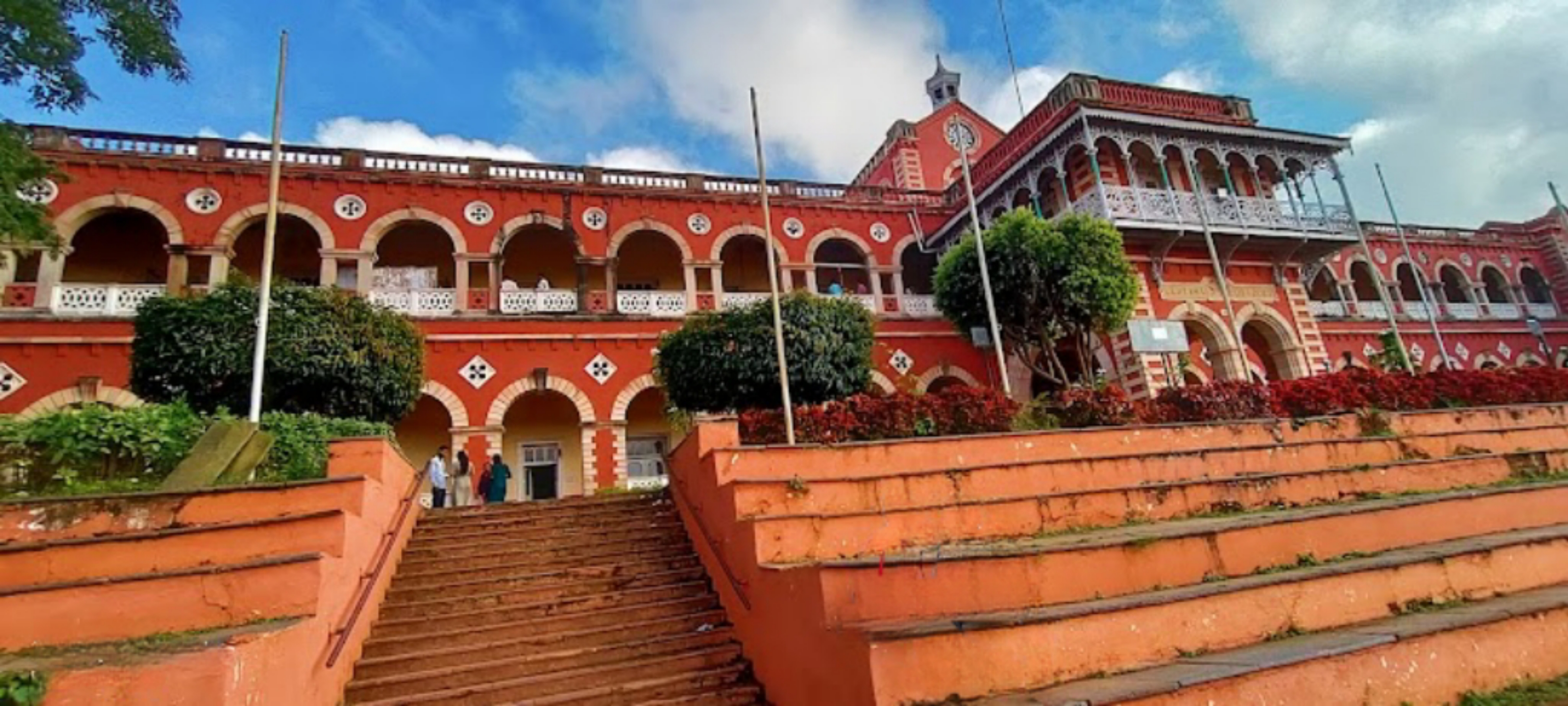
Karnatak College (KCD) primary venue of NYF 2023

Karnatak College (KCD), Karnatak University, and University of Agricultural Sciences were the prime venues for the event. Karnatak College (KCD) had most of the events hosted, with 50 food stalls and mega kitchen for the 8000 delegates participating from all over the country.

R N Shetty Stadium Dharawada

Locations include :

- Srujina Ranga Mandira
- KCD ground
- KCD Football Ground
- Agriculture University AC Hall 1
- R N Shetty Stadium
- Kelageri Lake Dharwad
- KUD green garden

== 2025 ==
The 28th National Youth Festival, themed Viksit Bharat Young Leaders Dialogue, was held in January 2025. Delegates from across India, including representatives from Nagaland, participated in discussions on national development. Among the Nagaland delegates was the founder of Kohima-based cybersecurity firm NexusCipherGuard India, who addressed participants on the importance of digital security in India's development.
