= Nahur railway station =

Railway Station in Maharashtra, India

Nahur
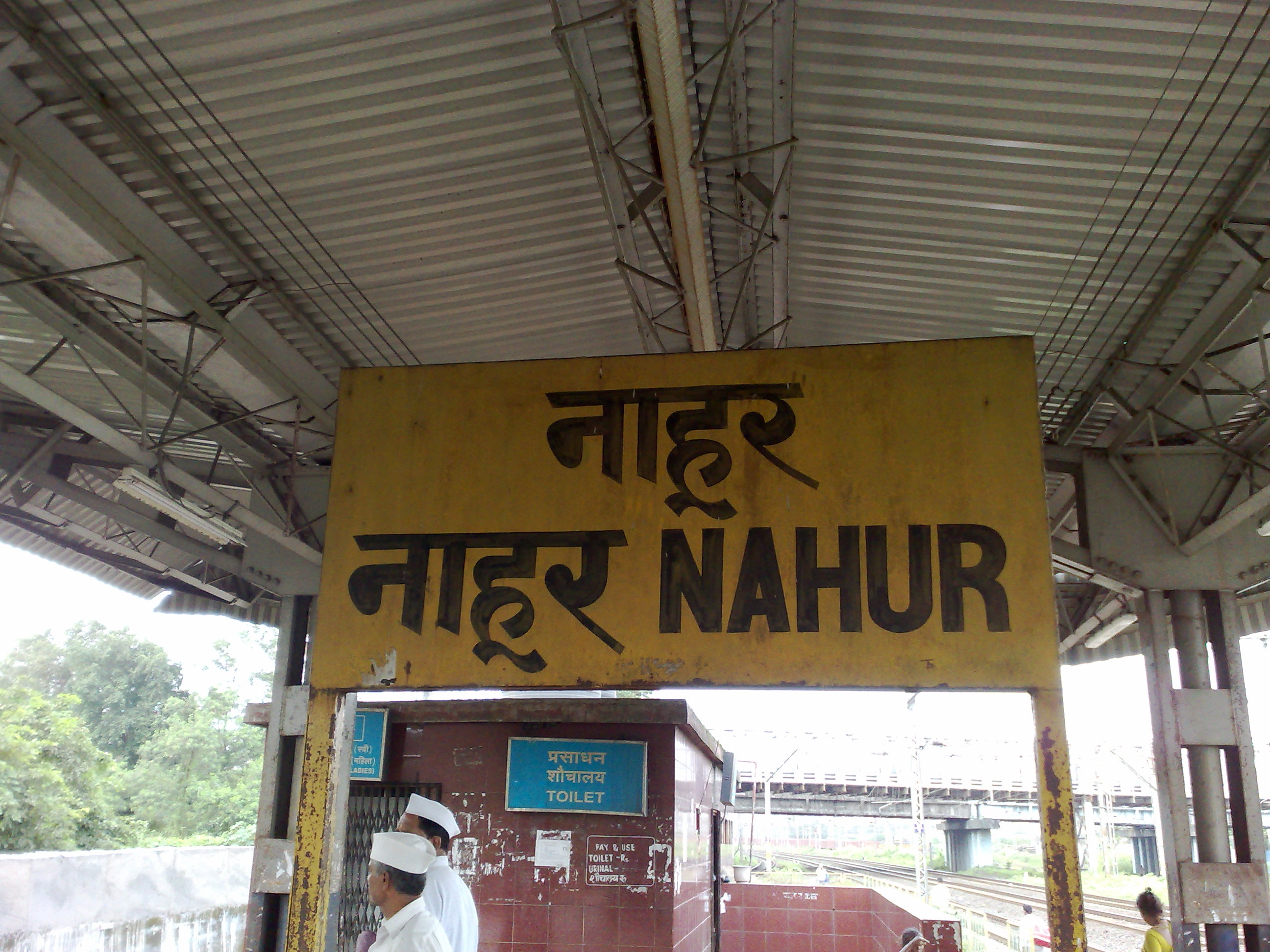

General information
- Coordinates: 19.14°N 72.93°E
- System: Indian Railways and Mumbai Suburban Railway station
- Owner: Ministry of Railways, Indian Railways
- Line: Central Line
- Platforms: 2

Other information
- Status: Active
- Station code: NHU
- Fare zone: Central Railways

History
- Opened: 21 April 2006

Services
Preceding station	Mumbai Suburban Railway	Following station
Bhandup towards Chhatrapati Shivaji Terminus	Central line	Mulund towards Kasara or Khopoli
Route map
Location
- Location within Mumbai

Nahur (station code: NHU) is a railway station on the Central line of the Mumbai Suburban Railway network.

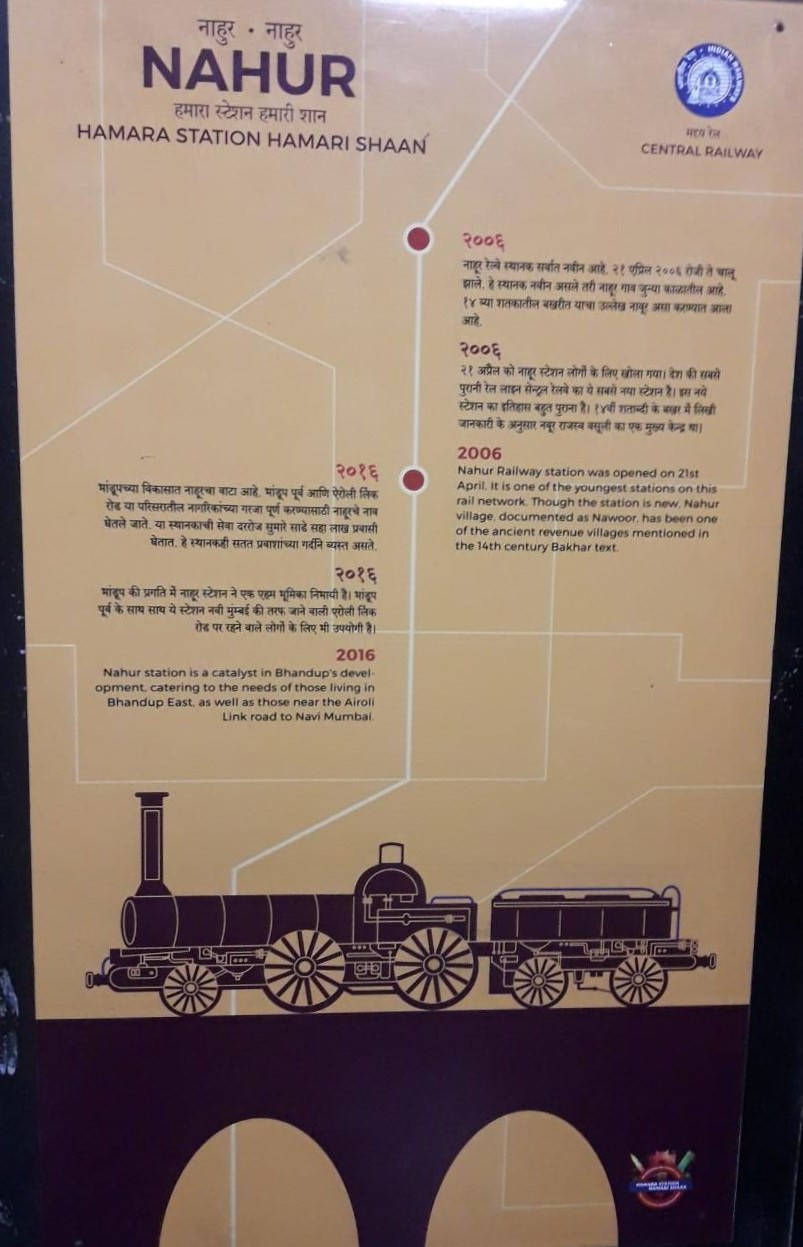
Nahur station banner

Nahur railway station falls under the jurisdiction of Central Railways and it was constructed to reduce the distance (between two consecutive train stations) between Bhandup and Mulund railway stations, which was quite large. Nahur has also helped in reducing the congestion in these stations, especially during the peak hours. Only slow trains halt at Nahur, as it currently doesn't have the provisions (or the need) to introduce platforms for fast trains. Nahur station was officially inaugurated on 21 April 2006.

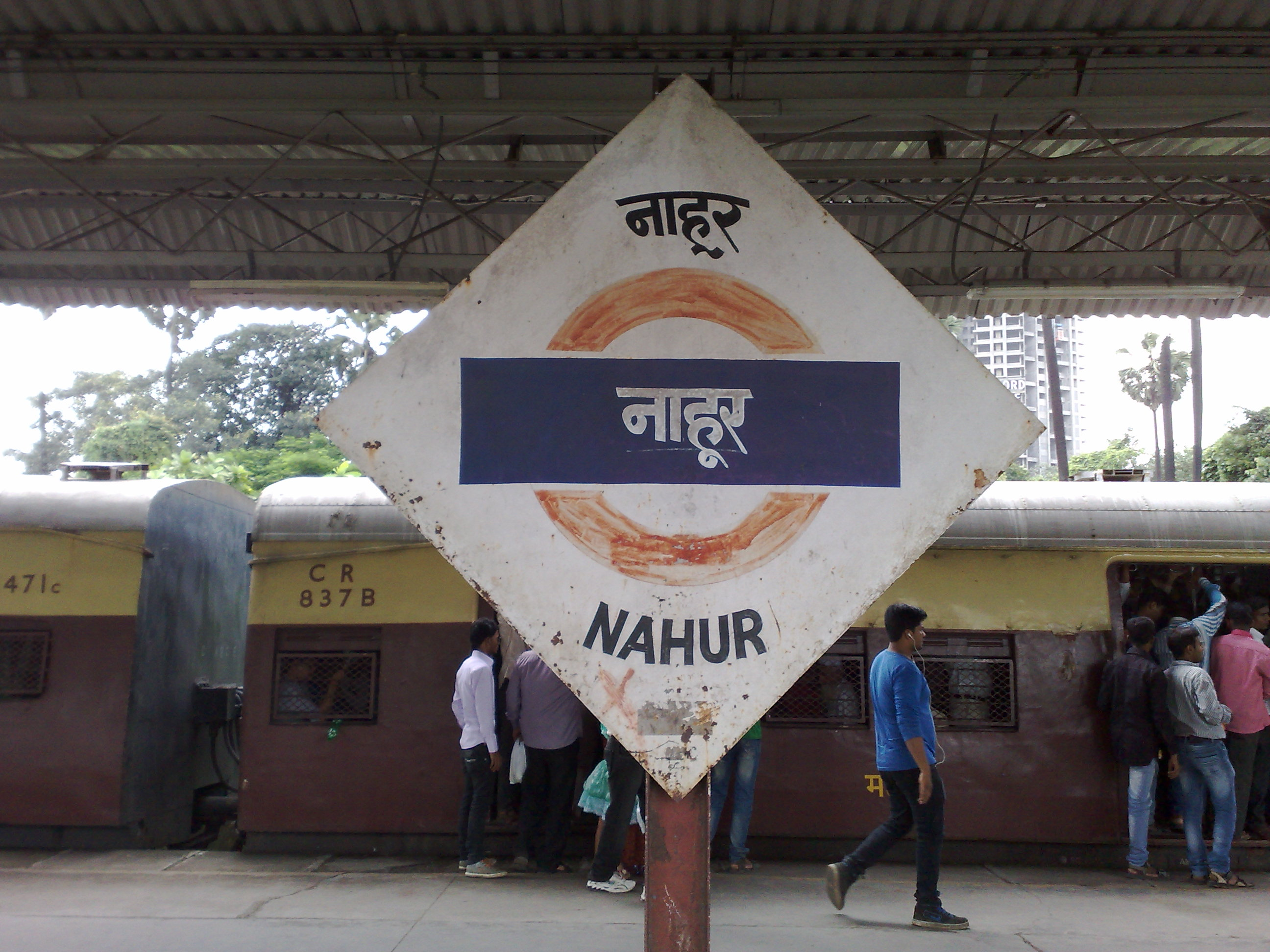
Nahur railway station – platformboard

Nahur station has been a catalyst in Bhandup's development, catering to the needs of those living in Bhandup East, as well as those near the Airoli Link road. This is also the nearest railway station on the Central Railway connecting to Airoli in New Mumbai. It can also be approached from Bhandup Station from either side. East and West of Nahur station are connected though the Mulund-Goregaon Link Road.
