= National Youth Day (India) =

Swami Vivekananda Jayanti is celebrated as National Youth Day

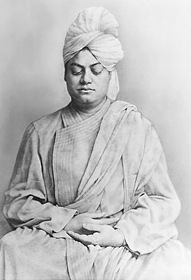
- Official name: National Youth Day
- Also called: Vivekananda Jayanti
- Observed by: India and RKM branch centres worldwide
- Liturgical color: Browny Orange
- Significance: Birth anniversary of Swami Vivekananda
- Begins: 1985; 41 years ago
- Date: 12 January
- Next time: 12 January 2026
- Frequency: Annual
- Started by: Government of India

National Youth Day, also known as Vivekananda Jayanti, is celebrated annually on 12 January, being the birthday of a Hindu monk, Swami Vivekananda. In 1984, the Government of India declared this day as National Youth Day and since 1985 the event is celebrated in India every year.

== History ==
It was a decision of the Government of India taken in 1984 to celebrate the birthday of the great Swami Vivekananda, i.e. 12 January, as National Youth Day every year. The Government said that the philosophy of Swamiji and the ideals for which he lived and worked could be a great source of inspiration for the Indian Youth Day.

== Celebration and activities ==
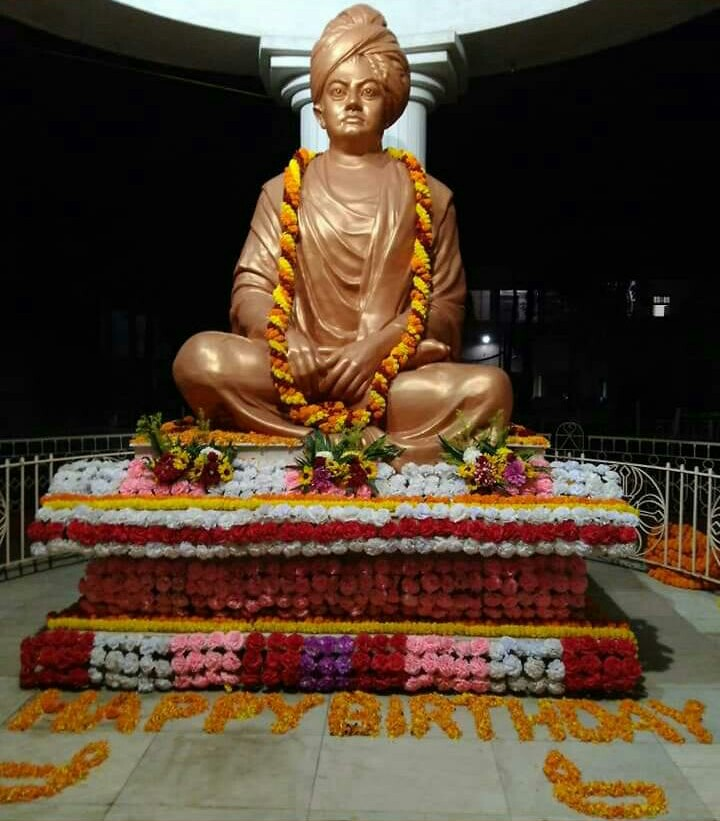
Celebration of Swami Vivekananda's 156th birthday at Baranagar Ramakrishna Mission of West Bengal, India in 2019

The National Youth Day is observed all over India at schools and colleges, with processions, speeches, music, youth conventions, seminars, yogasanas, presentations, competitions in essay-writing, recitations and sports on 12 January every year. Swami Vivekananda's lectures and writings, deriving their inspiration from Indian spiritual tradition and the broad outlook of his Master Sri Ramakrishna Paramahansa. These were the source of inspiration and have motivated numerous youth organizations, study circles and service projects involving the youth.

Swami Vivekananda's birthday (12 January 1863), according to the Indian Almanac (Vishuddha Siddhanta Almanac) is on Pausha Krishna Saptami tithi, which falls on different dates in the English Calendar every year (generally in the month of January). This is observed in various centres of Ramakrishna Math and Mission in a traditional Hindu manner which includes mangal arati (a kind of worship practised in India, especially by Hindu people), special worship, homa (fire-ritual), meditation, devotional songs, religious discourses and sandhya-arati (vesper service at evenings).
