= Bhandup railway station =

Railway station in Mumbai, Maharashtra, India

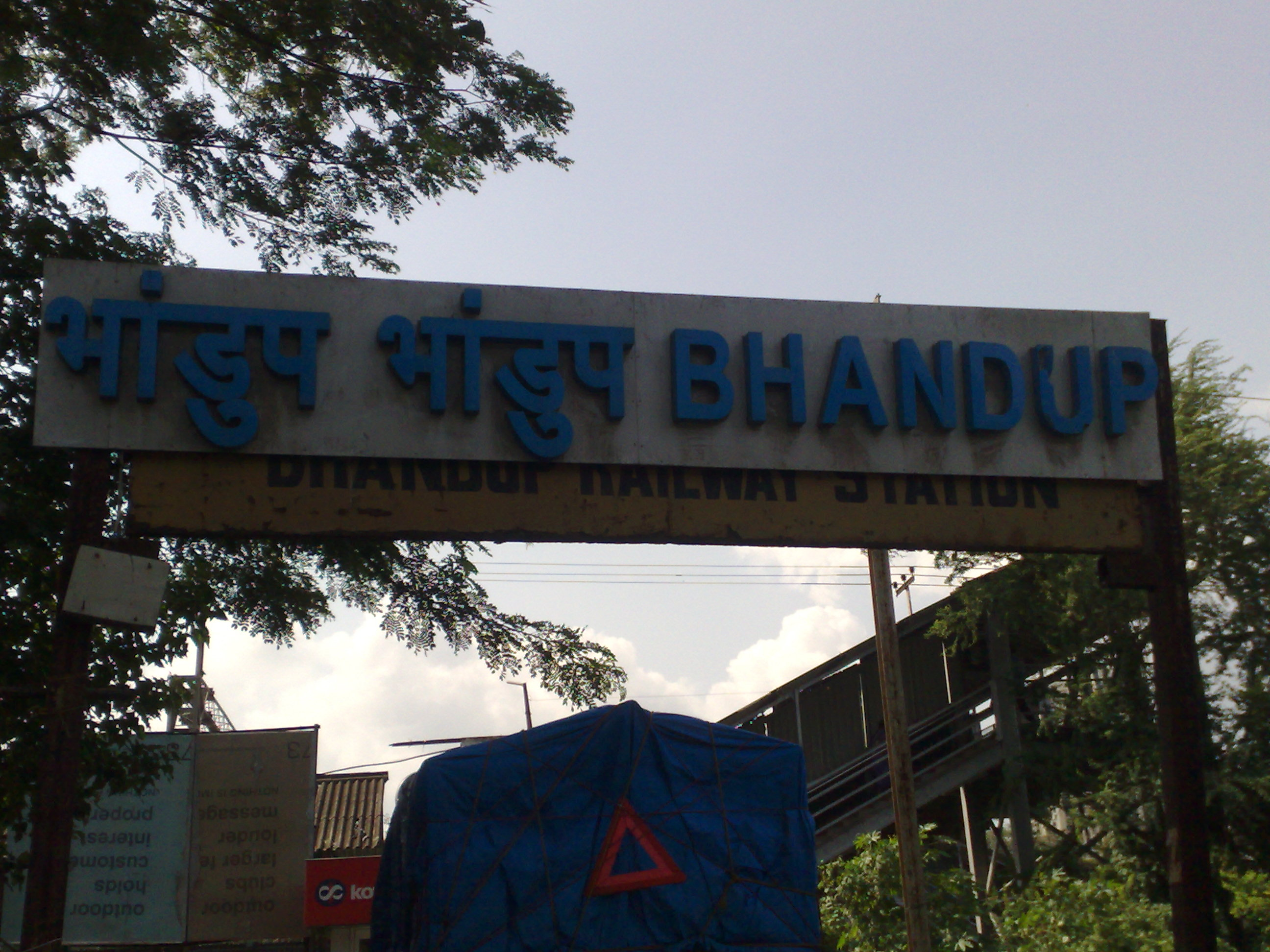

General information
- Coordinates: 19.14°N 72.93°E
- Elevation: 5.205 metres (17.08 ft)
- System: Indian Railways and Mumbai Suburban Railway station
- Owner: Ministry of Railways, Indian Railways
- Line: Central Line
- Platforms: 4
- Tracks: 7

Construction
- Structure type: Standard on-ground station
- Platform levels: 1
- Parking: only for bikes

Other information
- Status: Active
- Station code: BND
- Fare zone: Central Railway zone

History
- Opened: 18 April 1853

Passengers
- 2012-13: 1,75,273

Services
Preceding station	Mumbai Suburban Railway	Following station
Kanjur Marg towards Chhatrapati Shivaji Terminus	Central line	Nahur towards Kasara or Khopoli
Route map
Location
- Location within Mumbai

Bhandup (station code: BND) is a railway station on the Central line of the Mumbai Suburban Railway network. A few fast trains stop at Bhandup station, mostly during the peak hours.

== History ==
Bhandup's relationship with trains goes back to the very earliest times, for it was during a visit to Bhandup in 1843 that Colonel George Thomas Clark, Chief Engineer to the Bombay Government, first had the idea of linking Mumbai to Thane by railway. The route of the Bombay railway was worked out by G. T. Clark while on a visit to Seth Framji Cawasji Banaji's Bhandup Estate. Bhandup was a stop on the first railway service between Bombay's Bori Bunder Railway Station and Tannah (Thane), when it opened on 16 April 1853.

== Gallery ==
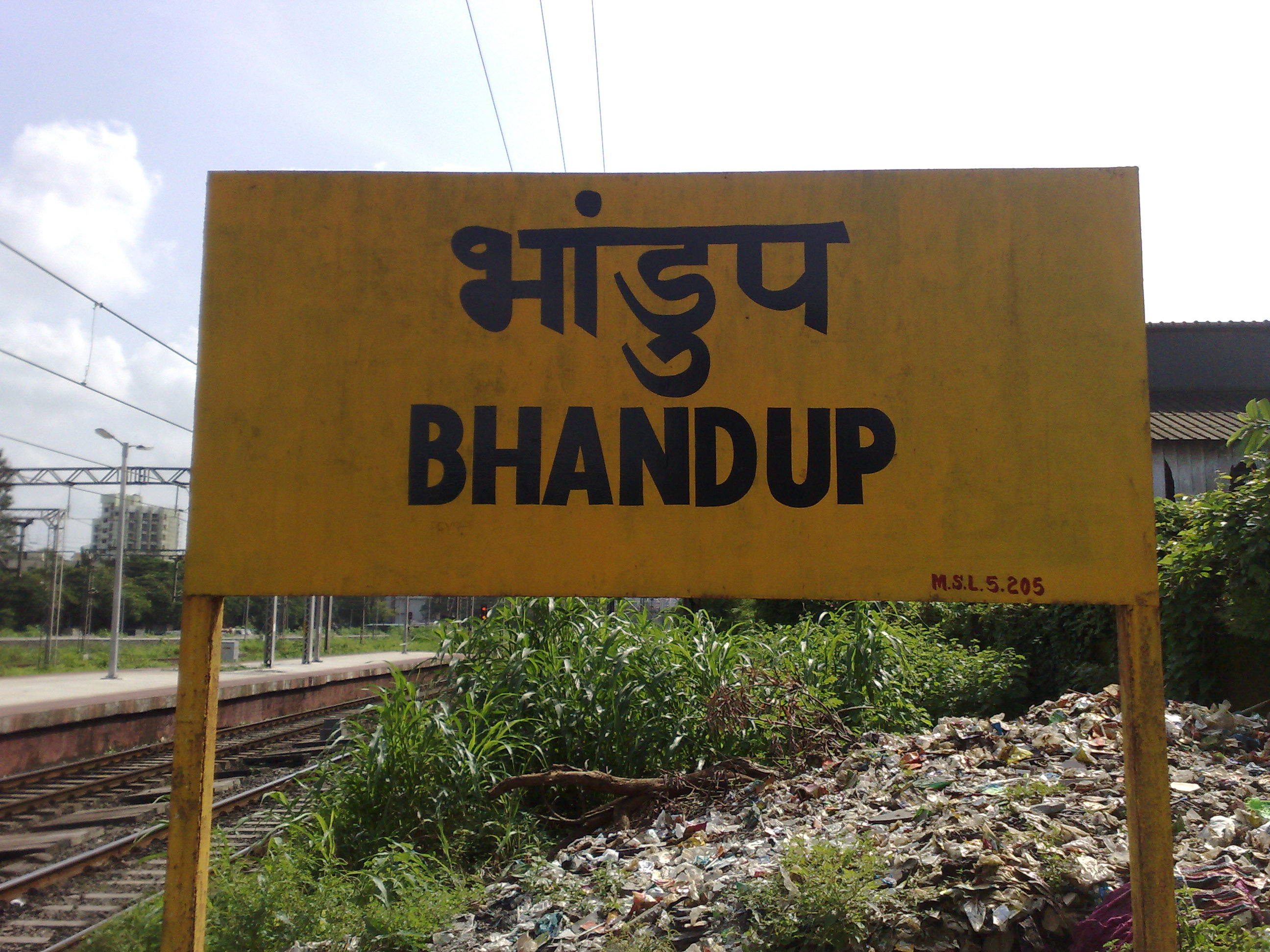
Bhandup Station board

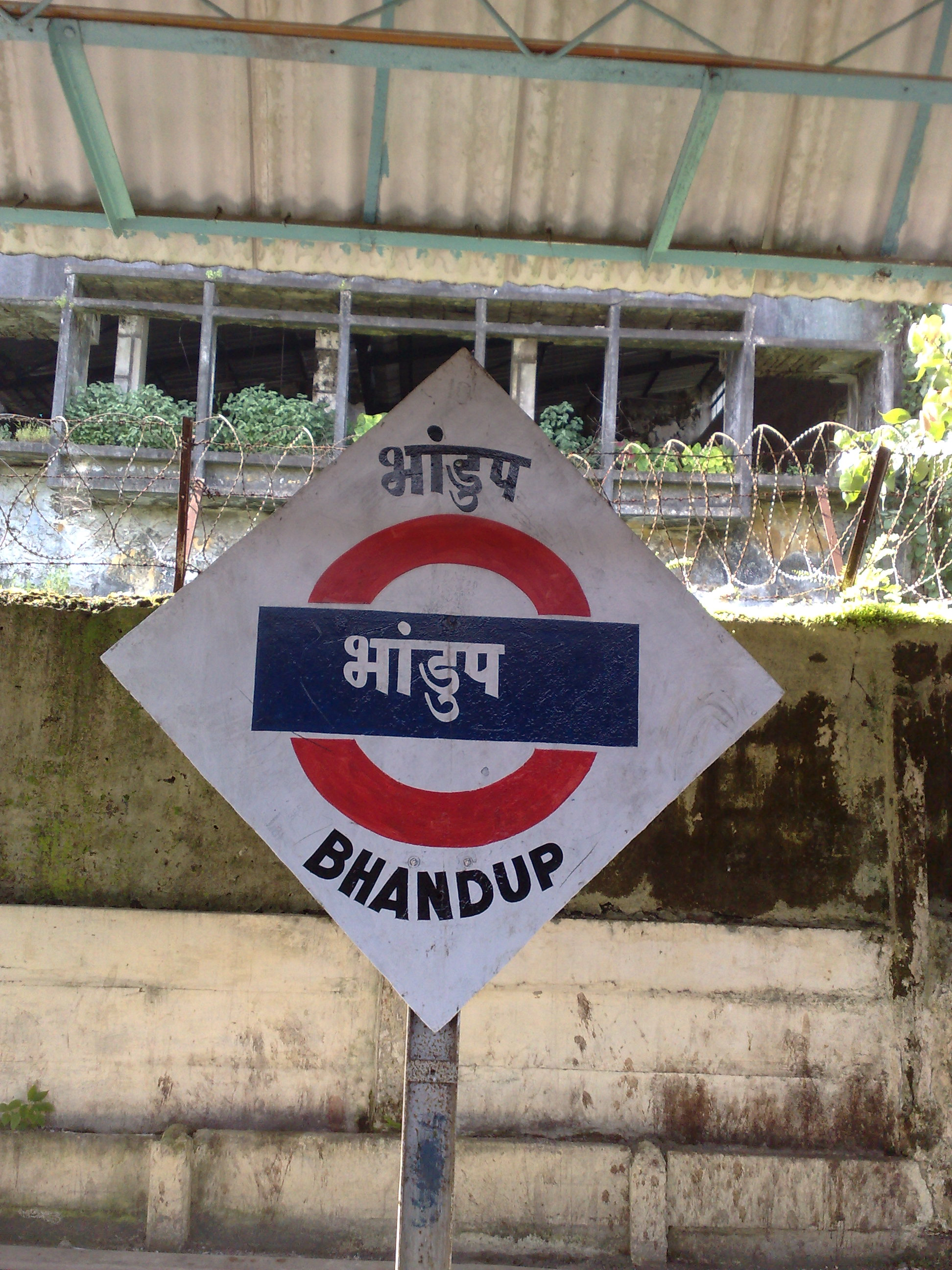
Bhandup Platform board

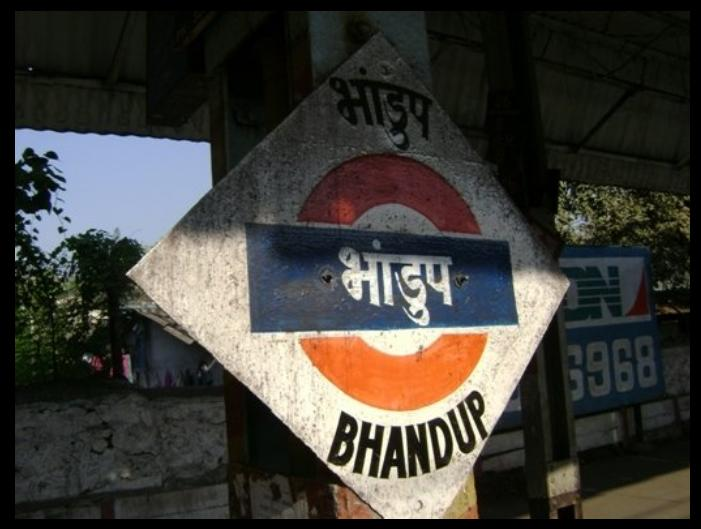
Another platform board of Bhandup
