= Ramji Bhangare =

Indian freedom fighter

Jemadar of British Indian Army Ramjirao Manajirao Bhangare Patil of Devgaon
- रामजीराव माणाजीराव भांगरे
- Born: Ramjirao Manajirao Bhangare; Devgaon, Maratha Empire
- Other names: Ramji Patil
- Occupation: Military personnel
- Movement: Indian independence movement
- Criminal charges: Murders
- Criminal penalty: Death
- Children: Raghoji Bhangare; Bapuji Bhangare
- Parent: Manaji Bhangare (father)

The Ramji Bhangare, or Ramji Bhangria was a revolutionary from Maharashtra, Patil of Devgaon, Jemadar in British Indian Army and was father of the revolutionaries Raghoji Bhangare and Bapuji Bhangare. He challenged and breakdown the British authorities in Konkan from 1798 to 1814. but before this, during the reign of Bajirao Peshwa, he along with his uncle Valoji Bhangare, revolted against Peshwa government because of land rights of locals and plundered the several territorial places of Peshwa.

During revolt of Ramoshis, Ramji Bhangare leaves the Jemadar post in British army and revolted against British rule. He joined another revolutionary Govindrao Khare from Konkan and plundered the several villages.

== Early life ==
The Ramji Bhangare was born in a Koli family to Manaji Bhangare who was Patil of Devgaon and chief of Mahadev Kolis of Bhangare clan.

== Rebellions ==
In 1798, a fresh disturbance took place among the Kolis. The leader of this outbreak was Ramji Naik Bhangria, he was an abler and more daring man than his predecessors, and succeeded in baffling all the efforts of the Peshwa Government officers to seize him. As force seemed hopeless, the Peshwa offered Ramji to be pardon and gave him an important Subedar post, in which he did excellent service.

Even after the establishment of the British rule in the Deccan, nearly twenty years passed before the warlike Kolis were brought to order. In 1822, Ramji along with his close aide Rama Kirwa who was Subedar of Ratangadh fort, planned to attack the British troops in Ahmednagar but it was controlled by government and Gwalior State army. But later in 1828, he infested the Thane and Pune districts. In 1829, Kolis were again troublesome and, under their leaders Ramji Bhangria and Rama Kirwa, ravaged the country far and wide. In 1830, he was joined by the Bhils and their conjoint raids became most daring and systematic. British Troops were despatched against him under the command of Captain Luykin and Lieutenants Lloyd and Forbes and, with the help of the Brahmins, the revolt was put down and the leaders were taken and executed.
