= Dhangar =

Shepherd caste in India

The Dhangars is a caste or clan whose members are found in the Indian states of Maharashtra, northern Karnataka, Goa, and Madhya Pradesh. They are referred to as Gavli Dhangars in northern Maharashtra (Khandesh region) and the forested hill tracts of India's Western Ghats. There are many distinct Gavli castes in Maharashtra, and Dhangar Gavli is one of them.

== History ==
=== Etymology ===
The word "Dhangar" is inscribed in a Buddhist cave in Pune district of Maharashtra. It is believed that this inscription has its origin between the first and the third century AD. Multiple theories have been proposed for the origin of the word Dhangar. It may be associated with a term for "cattle wealth". Bhagwan Lal Indraji maintains that it is derived from the Sanskrit word Dhang which means 'hill'. Syed Siraj-Ul-Hassan noted that some people of his time believed the term to come from the Sanskrit "dhenugar" ("cattle herder") but dismissed that etymology as being "fictitious". In Kannada, the word Danagãra means 'cowherd' and is derived from Dana which means 'cattle'. Dana is the tadbhava of Dhana, which comes from Go-dhana, meaning 'cattle' in Sanskrit.

According to Shamba Joshi, Hatakara-Dhanagara (Hatkar-Dhangar) is a compound of two words of the same meaning.

=== Subdivisions ===
Initially there were twelve tribes of Dhangar, and they had a division of labour amongst brothers of one family. The nation around Hingoli was called Bara-Hatti which means country of twelve Hatkar-Dhangars. These twelve tribes later formed three sub-divisions and one half-division. These three being Hatkar (shepherd), Gavli or Dange (cowherd) and Khutekar (wool and blanket weaver)/Sangar. All sub-castes fall in either of these divisions.

=== Historical migrations ===
The archaeological evidence and ethnographic data suggest that the contemporary Dhangar castes are the result of more than one migration from North-West India, between 4000 and 10000 BC. The density and distribution patterns of the different groups of Dhangars seem to have been guided by the suitability of the region for the sustenance of the animals that they traditionally maintained and the products of those animals on which the specific groups subsisted. Ethno-historic investigations among the Dhangars suggest that the Kannade, Unnikankan and Kurmar who speak Kannada were originally from Karnataka and might have migrated to the present habitats in Maharashtra at different points of time. Whereas Hatkar, Zende, Thellari and Dange trace their origin to a single caste in the remote past, Shegars or Sagar Rajputs claim that they have nothing to do with the Dhangars and are descendants from Rajputs of Rajasthan. Ahirs speak "Ahrani", also known as Gavli boli, a mixed dialect of Gujarati and Marathi and are closely related to the Ladshe and Dange who have supposedly come from Gujarat. On the other hand, Gadhari-Nikhar and Gadhari-Dhangar, having migrated from North India, speak Sanskrit and Hindi. Telangi speaks Telugu and probably migrated from Andhra Pradesh, the remaining groups speak Marathi.

=== Past occupation ===
The Gavli or Dange Dhangars found in the coastal strip practiced cattle/buffalo/sheep herding and shifting cultivation. ahir, Halmat, Khutekar, Kurmar-Unnikankan, Mendhe, Shegar, Telangi, Unnikankan and Zade herded sheep and wove woolen blankets. Dhangar, Hande, Hatkar, Hattikankan, Kannade, Kurmar-hattikankan and Zende reared only Sheep. However, Hatkars in Sangli district also maintained cattle and some Zendes used to maintain ponies. Thellaris herded both sheep and cattle. Sangars were weavers of woolen blankets. In the past, some Dhangars were Inamdars and some were tenure-holders, holding lands either by a share or by paying a lump sum for a certain period.

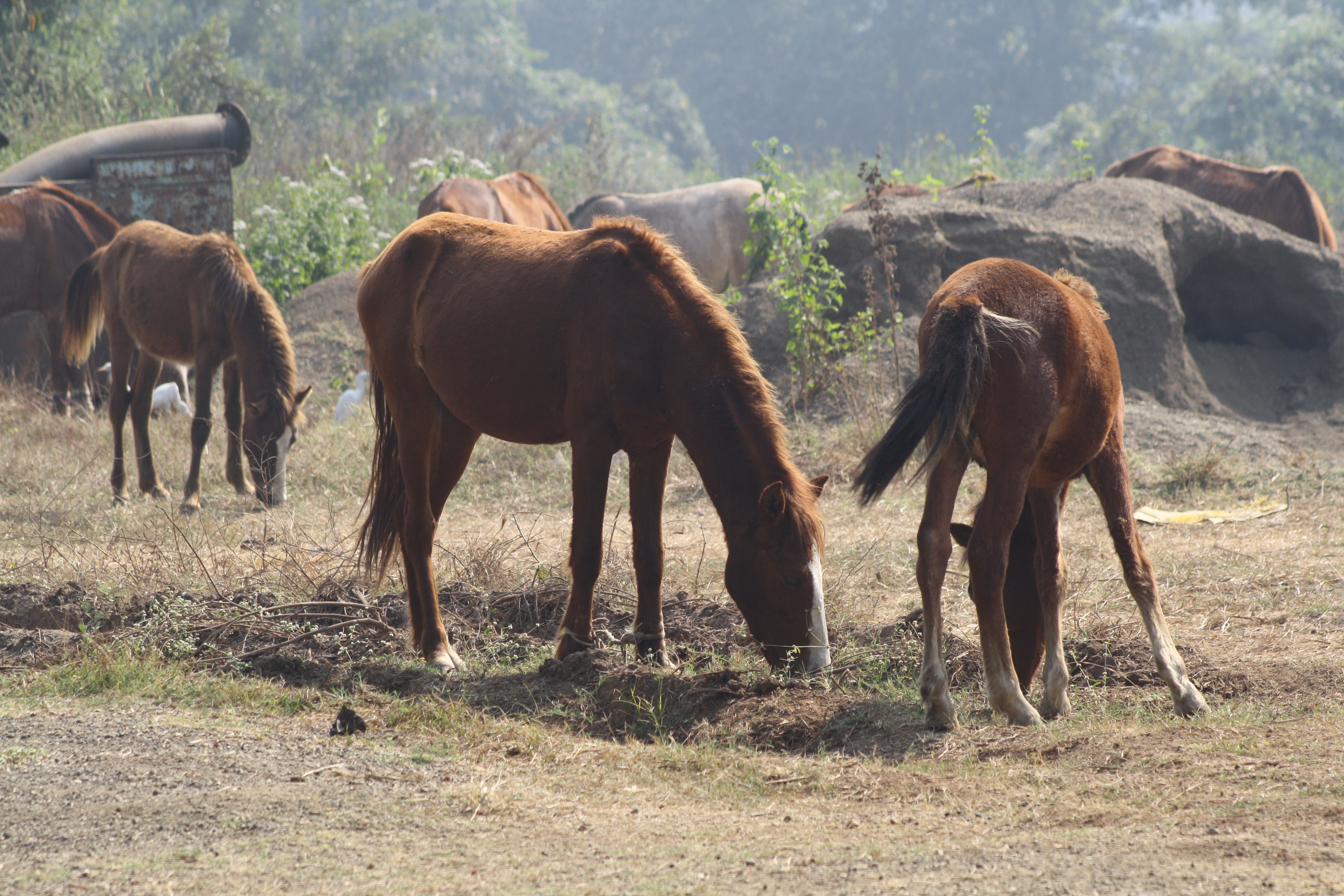
Ponies used by Dhangar tribe of Maharashtra

Dhangars were also known for producing fine breeds of cattle and ponies. Khillari cattle, a mixture with a breed of Mysore, was pioneered by a Dhangar of Nashik named Gowdia who owned cattle in Mysore state. Similarly, Dhangar or Khilari pony is considered the best breed of ponies in Deccan. It is believed that their superior excellence is due to the Dhangar's practice of castrating them.

=== Role in the Maratha Empire ===
Dhangars are noted for their martial qualities. A large number of Shivaji's most trusted Mawalas or Maratha footmen were West-Pune Dhangars. On the other hand, Hatkar Dhangars, who are found mainly in the former Nizam state, especially in Nanded, Parbhani and Vidarbha, are known as Bargi Dhangars or "shepherds with the spears" and were perhaps Bargirs or mounted troopers during the time of the Maratha Empire. However, Bargi or Bande Dhangar is a distinct sub-caste from them. Hatkars were in the army of Shivaji in large numbers and were known for their bravery in the Maratha Empire. "Naik" and "Rao" were the titles given to them. Hatkars were a dread to others and even Nizam was afraid of them. It is on the historical record that for restraining the Hatkars, Nizam had sought help from the British Indian army. While some sources claim Malhar Rao Holkar, Founder of the Maratha Indore state, belonged to the Hatkar Dhangar sub-caste, the bakhars of Holkar dynasty say that he was a Khutekar Dhangar.

"The three great tribes which compose the Maratha caste are the Kunbi or farmer, The Dhangar or shepherd, and the Goala or cowherd. To this original cause may perhaps be ascribed that great simplicity of manner which distinguishes the Maratha people".

— Colonel Tone, Commander of a regiment in the Peshwa's army in 1798

In fact, the word "Maratha" in its narrower use is applied to a society in which Rajputs or quasi-Rajputs, at the top, with Kunbis (farmers), Dhangars (shepherds), and Goalas (cowherds) practise hypergamy, each group taking wives from the one below, causing a superfluity of women at the top and a scarcity at the bottom of the social scale.

— John Henry Hutton, former chair of William Wyse Professor of Social Anthropology at the University of Cambridge

=== Relationship with Yadavs ===
According to the 1891 Census of India, the pastoral class of Indian population was divided into two groups. First group was called cattle graziers which included Ahirs, Gopas, Gawali and Golla. The second group was called shepherds which included Gadaria, Dhangars, Kuruba, Idaiyan, Bharwad and Rabari.

In the early 1920s, the leaders from the North Indian Ahir and the Maharashtrian Gavli which were ritually considered as lower castes and formed the bulk of landless peasants in Gangetic plains, founded All India Yadav Mahasabha (AIYM) in order to lay claims to Yadava identity through sanskritisation of their constituents and by re-imagining a glorified past based on a fabricated descent from the mythical Yadu. Many castes across India adopted Yadav as the last name, illustrating claimed descent from Yadu. They also started practicing vegetarianism and teetotalism. Various communities, all over India, who were traditionally involved in cattle related occupations enthusiastically followed these recommendations. This effort was part of the process of Sanskritization and Aryanization.

Dhangar society in India includes Dhangars in Maharashtra and Goa, Gadaria in North India, Bharwad in Gujarat, and Kuruba both in Karnataka and Andhra Pradesh. However, Dhangar Gavli is a distinct caste from Yadav Gavli in Maharashtra and Goa. Moreover, Ahirs of Maharashtra prefer to be known as Ahir Dhangars and Marathas of Indore (Madhya Pradesh), like Holkars, call themselves Dhangar gadaria. In North India the gadaria, who call themselves dhangar, were at one time a wing of Dhangar society. Ahir is one of the gotra of Dhangars.

== Rajputisation attempt ==
The Shegar Dhangars, also known as Sagar Rajputs, were previously identified as shepherd by occupation and Shudra by Varna but later they changed their surname to Rajput and started wearing sacred thread.

== Culture ==
Khandoba (literally "father swordsman"), the guardian deity of the Deccan is the favorite god of the caste and is worshiped every Sunday and on Saturday – the light sixth of Margashirsha day – with offerings of sweetmeats. Vithoba of Pandharpur is worshiped daily in every household. Biroba and Mhaskoba are other popular gods amongst Dhangars.

Gaja Nach, which literally means the dance of elephant, is a traditional dance of the Dhangars. Since it is considered auspicious, the dance is also performed at the time of temple festivals. The dancers also hold colorful scarves which when moved in a swaying manner suggest the fanning of elephant's ears.

Dhangari Ovi is a type of folk singing, which is about women's work songs and the epic-length performances of Dhangars, in which sung verses alternate with narrative passages in prose.

== Current situation ==
Traditionally being shepherds, cowherds, buffalo keepers, blanket and wool weavers, butchers and farmers, the Dhangars were late to take up modern-day education. In Maharashtra, the Dhangars are classified as a Nomadic Tribe but in 2014 were seeking to be reclassified as a Scheduled Tribe in India's system of reservation. The Dhangar community's population in Maharashtra is around 1.5 crore, which is 13% of the total 11.25 crore (112.5 million) population of the state. Devendra Fadnavis, former Chief Minister of Maharashtra, had said that "The situation of the Dhangars in some areas of the state was worse than that of Scheduled Tribes, and the government was committed to providing them reservation under the ST category".

=== Reservation ===
As per India's system of reservation, Dhangars are classified as Other Backward Class in Goa, Karnataka, Gujarat, Madhya Pradesh, Chhattisgarh, Uttar Pradesh, Uttarakhand and Delhi. In Maharashtra, they are classified as a Nomadic Tribe, which comes under Other Backward Class category.

=== Dhangar vs Dhangad issue in Uttar Pradesh and Maharashtra ===
Dhangar (shepherds) is a sub-caste of the Gadaria caste in Delhi, Madhya Pradesh and Chhattisgarh, the Kuruba caste in Karnataka and the Bharwad caste in Gujarat. Gadaria, Kuruba are classified as Other Backward Class in those respective states while Bharwad is classified as Scheduled Tribe in Gujarat, in India's system of reservation. In Maharashtra, the Dhangars come under Nomadic Tribe category within the larger Other Backward Class category. On the other hand, Dhangad (cultivators), also known as Oraon, Dhanka and Dom, are listed as Scheduled Tribes in the states of Maharashtra, Chhattisgarh, Madhya Pradesh and Orissa. In Bihar, Jharkhand and West Bengal Dhangad or Dom is listed as Scheduled Caste whereas Oraon as Scheduled Tribe.

According to the 27th report of Standing Committee on Labour and Welfare with regards to SCs and STs order (Second Amendment) Bill, 2002:

There are two distinct communities having similar nomenclature, one is Dhangad which is a sub-group of Oraon, a Scheduled Tribe appearing at S.No..36 of the List of Scheduled Tribes. The traditional occupation of this community is cultivation. There is another community known as 'Dhangar' whose traditional occupation is cattle rearing and weaving of woolens. The 'Dhangad' and the 'Dhangar' are two distinct communities having no ethnic affinity at all. The Dhangars who are shepherds have been notified as Nomadic tribe in the State of Maharashtra. Therefore, there is no printing mistake in the Scheduled Castes and Scheduled Tribes (Amendment) Act, 1976 through which the Constitution (Scheduled Tribes) Order, 1950 was amended.

On 17 January 2019, the Scheduled Castes and Scheduled Tribes Research and Training Institute (SCSTRTI) wrote a letter to the Principal Secretary to the Government of Uttar Pradesh stating the difference between Dhangar and Gadaria, and that the Hindi version of the word Dhangar is धंगड़ (Dhangad), which is classified as Scheduled Caste in Uttar Pradesh, as per the Gazette notification issued in 1950 by the President/Indian Government. They recommended that the Gadaria community's धनगर (Dhangar) should not be included in the Scheduled Caste category and rather belong to the Other Backward Class category in the state of Uttar Pradesh.

== Notable people ==
- Malhar Rao Holkar (1694-1766), Maratha founder of the Holkar Indore State.
- Ahilyabai Holkar (31 May 1725 – 13 August 1795), Queen of the Indore State.
- Yashwant Rao Holkar (1797-1811), King of the Indore State.
- Anna Dange, former minister in Maharashtra government.
- Anil Anna Gote, current member of Maharashtra Legislative Assembly.
- Chandrakant Kavlekar, current Deputy Chief Minister of Goa.
- Dattatray Vithoba Bharne, current state minister in Maharashtra government.
- Ganpatrao Deshmukh, former cabinet minister and current MLA from Sangola, holds record for longest serving MLA (1962 to present).
- Gopichand Padalkar, current member of Maharashtra Legislative Council from Maharashtra.
- Mahadev Jankar, founder of the Rashtriya Samaj Party, former cabinet minister and current member of Maharashtra Legislative Assembly.
- Ram Shinde, former minister in Maharashtra government.
- Vikas Mahatme, Member of Parliament in Rajya Sabha for Maharashtra. He has been awarded Padma Shri for his contribution to ophthalmology and social work.
