= Venkoji (Koli chief) =

Koli military leader in Maratha army

Subedar of Maratha Army Venkoji Koli Chief of Koli people
- वेंकोजी कोळी
- Born: Maval, Maratha Empire
- Military career
- Allegiance: Maratha Empire
- Branch: Maratha Army
- Rank: Subedar
- Unit: Mavala

The Venkoji Koli was Koli military leader in Maratha Army of Maratha Empire of Shivaji.

== Background ==
During the Mughal attack at Ahmadnagar Sultanate, the Sultan of Ahmednagar asked Venkoji for help. In response, Venkoji threatened the Mughals and cut off communication with Gujarat. After that, to subdue the Venkoji Koli, a Mughal commander named Saiyid Raja fought against Venkoji but he was defeated and killed by Venkoji. After that, Venkoji Koli harassed the Mughal army.

== Titles ==
- Deshmukh, Venkoji Koli was Deshmukh of a Jagir which was granted by Peshwa for his service.
- Nayak, Venkoji was Nayak of Koli people which he belong and responsible for maintaining the law and order.
