= Javji Bamble =

Koli military leader in Maratha Empire

Mansabdar of Rajur Deshmukh Javjirao Hirajirao Bamble Deshmukh
- Born: Jiwaji Bamble
- Died: 1789; Rajur, Rajur Subah, Maratha Empire
- Children: Hiraji Bamble (son) chief of Deccan Koli Corps
- Relatives: Tuljabai (mother) sister of Ramjirao Manajirao Bhangare; Ramji Bhangare (uncle); Valoji Bhangare (grand uncle); Raghojirao Ramjirao Bhangare (cousin); Bapujirao Ramjirao Bhangare (cousin)
- Military career
- Allegiance: Maratha Empire
- Branch: Maratha Army
- Rank: Governor (Mansabdar) of Rajur Subah
- Nickname: Jiwaji Naik
- Unit: Mavala

The Javjirao Hirajirao Bamble also known as Jivaji Bamble was a Koli Mansabdar of Rajur in the Maratha Empire, was the Deshmukh of 60 villages and chief of the Bamble clan. His family had been Vassals since the time of the Bahmani Sultanate. After the death of his father Hiraji Bamble, he succeeded his father.

In 1760, Javji Bamble revolted against the Peshwa Madhavrao. The reason for the rebellion was Javji Bamble was not given his father's fief and title, due to which Javji took up arms against the Peshwa, and shook the peace of Ahmednagar.

== Rebellion ==
Javji started plundering the area under the Peshwa, after which the Peshwa wanted to compromise, citing Javji and asking him to stop the rebellion happening in the Konkan region. He refused because he had no faith in the Peshwa, and went to Khandesh. So the Peshwa arrested Bamble's family and sent the Maratha Army to capture Javji. Subedar Ramji Sabant, heading the Maratha army, captured three of Javji's kolis, including a cousin Javji had sent to see to the well-being of his family. After that Javji killed Ramji Sabant's brother. Ramji Sabant sought reinforcements from the Peshwa and began a search for Javji. In spite of his large army, Ramji could not catch him, and was killed along with one of his sons, and this greatly shook the Peshwa. After this, the Peshwa made Sabant's elder son Subedar but he also was killed by Javji, in Junnar. After this, the Maratha government declared Javji Bamble a dacoit.

== Capture of forts ==
After being declared as Dacoit, Javji Bamble continued the 'Koli rebellion' and joined with Raghunathrao. Along with Koli rebels, he captured Lohagad fort of Pune from the Peshwa in 1770, Bhairogarh Fort, Shidgarh Fort, Kotah Fort along with many other forts in Thane, not only Nashik's Alang Fort and also Ratangarh and Madangarh forts in Ahmednagar from Peshwa. Subsequently, Nana Fadnavis, the minister of high rank in the Maratha Empire, sent Subedar Dauji Kokate to kill Javji but Kokate was killed by Javji. Javji Bamble stopped his revolt with the behest of his friend Maharaja Tukoji Rao Holkar of Indor State and returned the captured forts to the Peshwa.

== Mansabdari and death ==
After returning the forts to Peshwa, Javji Bamble was made the Mansabdar of Rajur in the Maratha Empire and the land property (Jagir) of his father was returned, along with the title of Deshmukh. Javji Bamble died in 1789 and succeeded by his son Hiraji Bamble.

== See also ==
- List of Koli people
- List of Koli states and clans
