= Kheroji Pattikar =

Koli Subedar of Maratha army

Subedar of Maratha Army Kherojirao Pattikar Patil of Kolis
- खेरोजीराव पाटीकर
- Born: Maval, Maratha Empire
- Died: Maval, Maratha Empire
- Military career
- Allegiance: Maratha Empire
- Branch: Maratha Army
- Rank: Subedar
- Nickname: Subedar Pattikar
- Unit: Mavala
- Conflicts: Capture of Trimbak fort
- Awards: Grant of villages and money, received title of Deshmukh by Peshwa

Kherojirao Pattikar was Koli subedar in the Maratha Army of Maratha Empire during the reign of Maratha ruler Chhatrapati Shivaji.

== Early life ==
Kheroji Pattikar was born in a Koli family of the Maval region to Sambhajirao Pattikar Koli, who was vassal under the Peshwa.

== Capture of Trimbak fort ==
Kherojirao Pattikar and other Koli chiefs collected an army of Kolis of Maval region known as Koli Mavala and attacked at the Trimbak fort of Nizam of Hyderabad state on the behalf of current Peshwa Moropant Trimbak Pingle. Pattikar and Bhangare captured the fort and annexed into Maratha Empire. Kherojirao Pattikar and Gamaji Bhangare were received the grant of villages, money and title of Deshmukh for ruling that villages by Peshwa.

== Titles ==
- Pattikar, the family of Kherojirao was landholding or chief of village so they were given the title of Pattikar for holding or maintaining the village.
- Patil, Kherojirao was chief, or Patil of Kolis who maintains the law and order in Koli caste and responsible for religious activities.
- Deshmukh, after capturing the fort of Trimbak, Kheroji received the grant of villages and title of Deshmukh for ruling over these villages.
- Mavala, Kheroji was known as Mavala because of the Maval region which was known as Koli country.

== See also ==
- Pattikar Koli
