= Bhairav =

Bhairav or Bhairab often refers to;

- Bhairava, a fierce manifestation of Lord Shiva

Bhairav or Bhairab may also refer to:

== Places ==
- Bhairav (Gujarat), India
- Kot Bhairab, Nepal
- Bhairab River, Bangladesh
- Bhairab Upazila, Dhaka, Bangladesh
- Bhairabnath, Nepal

== Other ==
- Bhairav (raga), a Hindustani classical raga
- Bhairav (thaat), a thaat of Hindustani music
- Bhairon (tantrik), a disciple of Gorakhnath
- Bhairav, a fictional character in Ek Villain Returns

== See also ==
- Bhairava (disambiguation)
- Bhairavi (disambiguation)
- Bhairon (disambiguation)
- Bhairavnath (disambiguation)
- Kal Bhairab (disambiguation)
- Bhairab Ganguli (1931–2014), Indian cricket umpire
- Bhairavgad, a village in Maharashtra, India
  - Bhairavgad (fort)
