= Chimaji Jadhav =

Indian revolutionary

Chimaji Jadhav Nayak
- चिमाजी जाधव
- Born: Chimaji Jadhav; Konkan, Maratha Empire, British India, Asia
- Died: 1846; Ahmednagar Central jail, Ahmednagar district, British India
- Cause of death: Hanged
- Other names: Chimnaji Jadhav
- Citizenship: Marathi
- Occupation: Agriculturist
- Years active: 1839 - 1846
- Era: British era
- Predecessor: Raghoji Bhangare
- Successor: Nana Darbare; Bhau Khare
- Movement: Indian Independence movement
- Opponent: British officials
- Criminal charges: Thuggee; Murder; Blackmailing; Looting
- Criminal penalty: Hanged to death

The Chimaji Jadhav (also known as Chimnaji Jadhav) was Indian freedom fighter from Maharashtra in India and he led the rebellion from 1839 to 1846. He revolted against British government along with his supporters Nana Darbare and Bhau Khare to re-established the deposed Peshwa on the Maratha throne.

In the nights, Chimnaji Jadhav along with Raghoji Bhangare, Nana Darbare, Bhau Khare and Lahuji made plans to throw out the British and restore the Peshwa on Maratha throne.

== Rebellion ==
After the deposition of Peshwa, Chimnaji Jadhav assembled a revolutionary army and in the night, Jadhav attacked at Mahalkari treasure in Pune. but this time fifty of the revolutionaries were captured and tried in court and sentenced to death by hanging. Chimnaji Jadhav was escaped to Benaras but after some time returned to Pune and was captured by British troops and hanged in Ahmednagar Central jail.
