= List of Koli people =

List of the notable Koli personalities

The Koli people are a community native to India. Notable people of the community include:

== Military ==
=== Navy ===
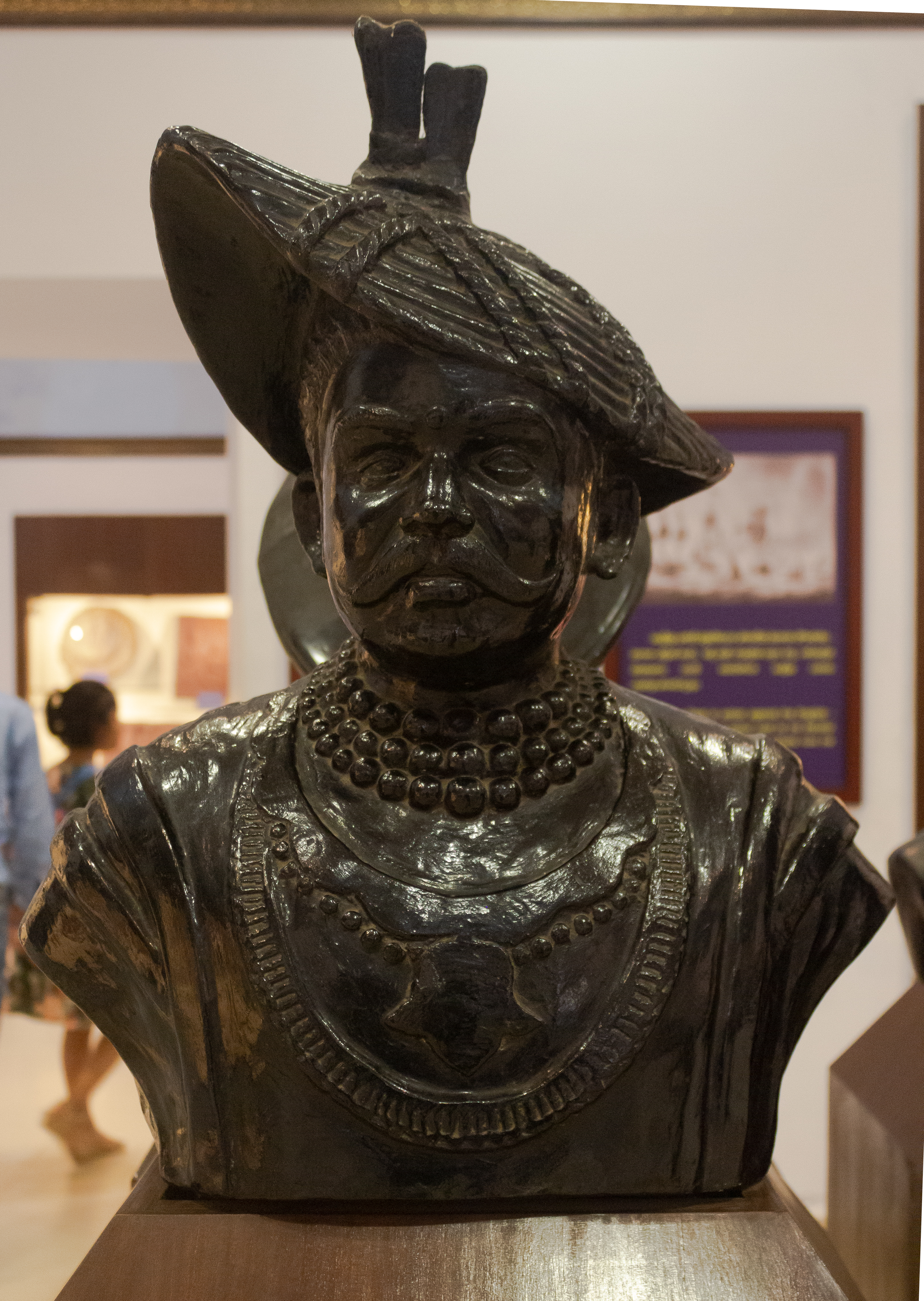
Bust of Kanhoji Angre in Visaka Museum

- Kanhoji Angre, Admiral of Maratha Navy
- Yakut Khan, Admiral of Mughal Navy
- Laya Patil, Naval chief in Maratha Navy
- Ram Patil, Admiral of Ahmednagar Sultanate navy
- Chempil Arayan, Admiral of Travancore Kingdom navy

=== Army ===
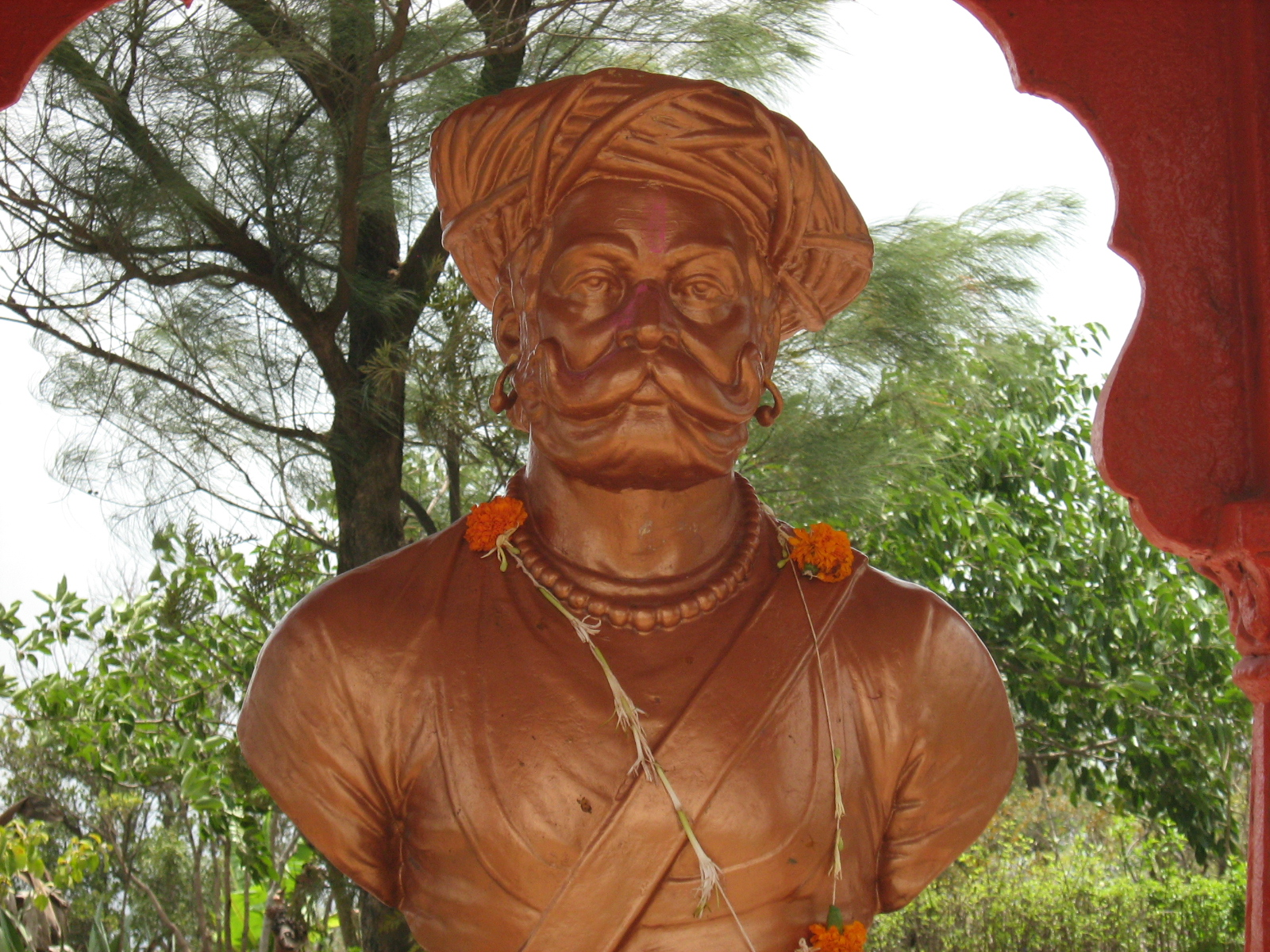
Tanaji Malusare

- Tanaji Malusare, General in Maratha Empire
- Javji Bamble, Mansabdar of Maratha Empire

== Politics ==
- Madhav Singh Solanki, former Chief Minister of Gujarat
- Bharti Shiyal, National Vice President of Bhartiya Janata Party, Member of Parliament from Bhavnagar
- Parshottambhai Solanki, Fishery Minister of Gujarat
- Ajitsinh Dabhi, Member of Parliament from Kheda and son of Fulsinh Dabhi Koli
- Anant Tare, was senior leader of Shiv Sena, former Mayor of Thane and Member of legislative council of Maharashtra
- Gigabhai Gohil, former Member of Parliament for Bhavnagar
- Pratap Shivram Singh, member of 3rd, 4th and 5th Lok Sabha, retired junior commissioned officer of British Indian Army and President of Akhil Bharatiya Kshatriya Koli Mahasabha
- Mohanbhai Patel, Member of Parliament from Junagadh constituency
- Balak Ram Kashyap, former Member of Parliament from Shimla Lok Sabha constituency and former Member of Legislative Assembly from Kasumpti Assembly constituency
- Roop Dass Kashyap, former Member of Legislative Assembly from Kasumpti Assembly constituency
- Krishan Dutt Sultanpuri, former Member of Parliament from Shimla Lok Sabha constituency
- Dhani Ram Shandil, Cabinet Minister of Himachal Pradesh Legislative Assembly and former Member of Parliament from Shimla Lok Sabha constituency
- Virender Kashyap, former Member of Parliament from Shimla Lok Sabha constituency
- Suresh Kashyap, Member of Parliament from Shimla Lok Sabha constituency
- Reena Kashyap, Member of Legislative Assembly from Pachhad Assembly constituency

== Revolutionaries and freedom fighters ==
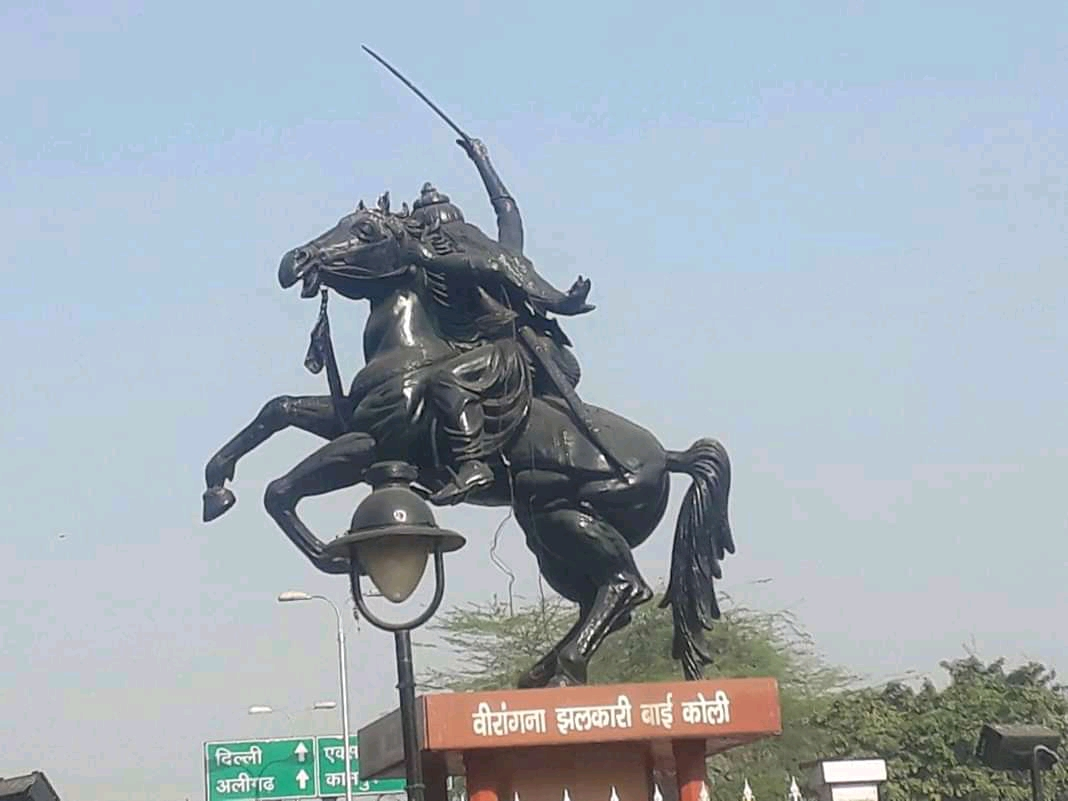
Jhalkaribai Koli statue in Agra, Uttar Pradesh

- Khemirao Sarnaik, challenged the Mughal Sultan Aurangzeb and dismissed the Jiziya
- Jhalkaribai, rebel leader of the Indian rebellion of 1857
- Rooplo Kolhi, hero of Indian Independence movement
- Govindas Ramdas, led the Kolis against British rule in Gujarat from 1826 to 1830
- Govind Rao Khare, Subedar of Ratangarh fort in Maratha Army later revolted against British rule after the defeat of Maratha Empire in 1840

== Rulers ==
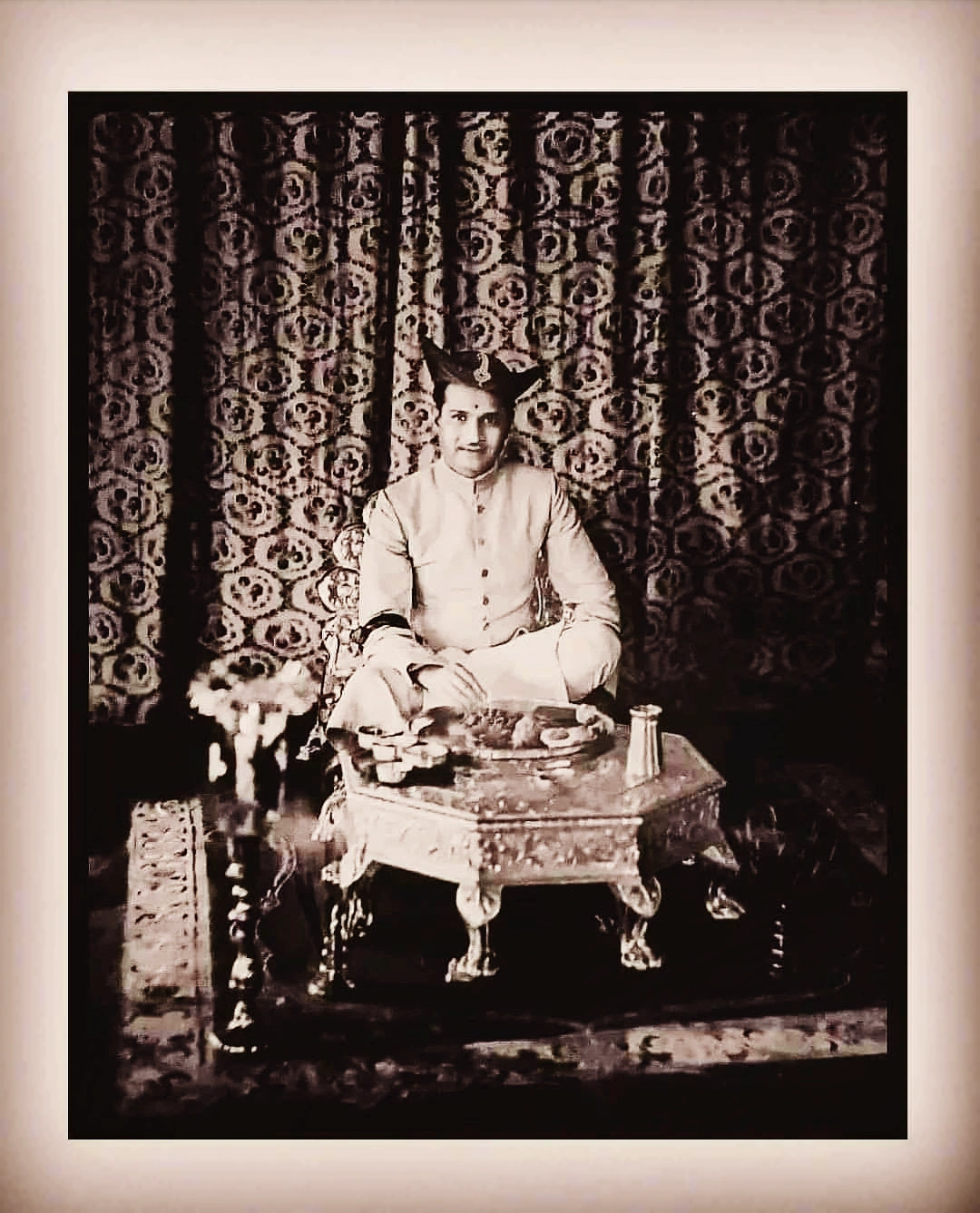
Maharaja Yashwantrao Martandrao Mukne of Jawhar State

- Yashwantrao Mukne, Maharaja of Jawhar State
- Zalim Jalia, chief of the Dahewan
- Nag Nayak, Rana of Sinhagad fort who defended the fort for eight months from Muhammad bin Tughluq

== Religion ==
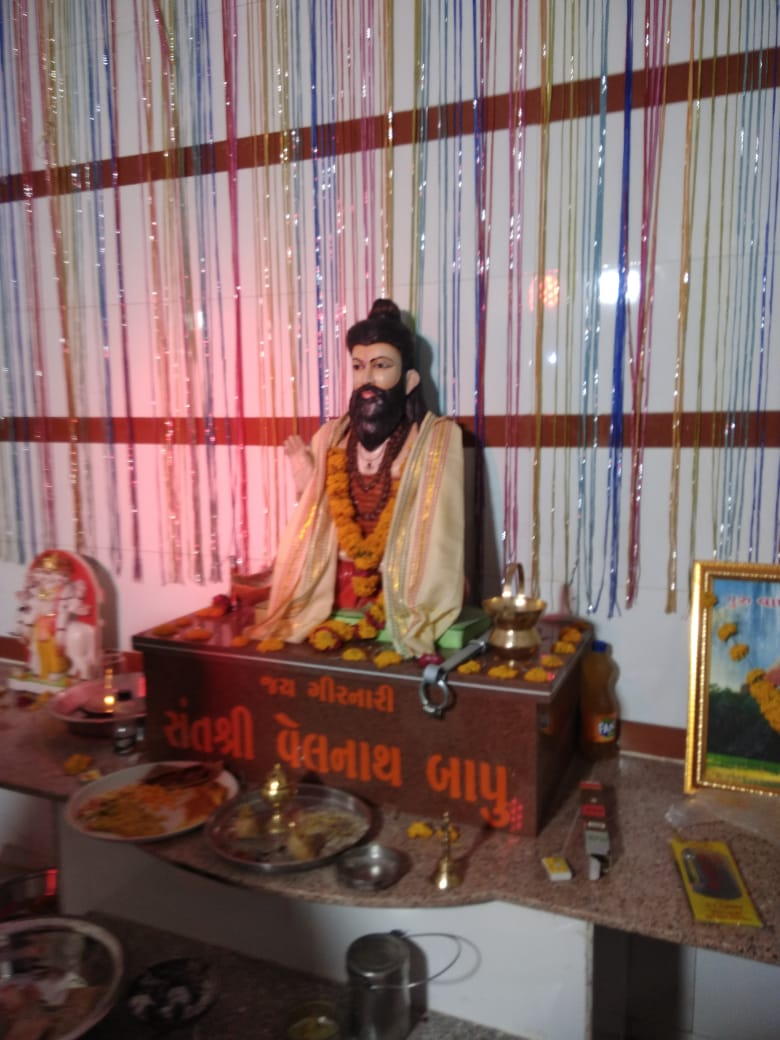
Velnath Thakor temple, Rajkot, Gujarat

- Bapu Velnath Thakor, saint from Gujarat
- Kanua Baba, a Koli saint of Uttar Pradesh followed by Hindus and Muslims

== See also ==
- List of Koli states and clans
- Koli language
