= Nayak (title) =

Indian ruler's title

Nayak, Nayaka or Nayakar, was historically a honorific title conferred on a military captain in various feudal states of the Indian subcontinent, as a derivative of the ancient Sanskrit word Nāyaka. The title often came with a prize in the form of a palayam, jagir, zamindari, or similar grant of a fief carved out of the newly annexed territory. Today, they are also used as surnames by the descendants of the original recipients and as the modern military rank of Naik, while the film industry has co-opted the term with Katha Nayagan and Kathanayakudu. The title is closely related to the Telugu Nayakudu, Nayudu, or Naidu, the Malayali Nair, and the Tamil Nayakar, Nayakan, Naicken, and Naicker. Nayaks are mostly Hindu with a few Sikhs.

== As a title ==
Today, the title is used by various castes and ethnic groups across India as a matter of tradition and custom.

- Nayak and Naik are surnames used by Koli caste of Maharashtra. The Princely State of Jawhar was founded by a Koli Nayak Jayaba Mukne around 1300. The Maval region was known as Koli country of fifty two valleys in Maratha Confederacy. Each valley was controlled by a Koli Nayak and the Sirnayak, or head chief, lived at Junnar, and presided over the gotarni, or caste council. the Fort of Sinhagad was built and ruled by Koli chief Nag Nayak who resisted the Sultan Muhammad bin Tughluq for eight months. the Kolis of Maharashtra revolted against Mughal ruler Aurangzeb under their Koli chief Khemirao Sirnaik and in 1769, Kolis revolted against Peshwa of Maratha Confederacy under their Koli Naik Javji Bamble and broken the peace of Konkan and in 1798, Kolis challenged the Company under their Koli Naik Ramji Naik Bhangria who was father of freedom fighters Bapuji Bhangare and Raghoji Bhangare.
- In Andhra Pradesh, Telangana and Karnataka, the Naik and Nayak versions are used by people belonging to Lambadi and Banjara social groups. Naicker and Naidu titles are also used by Telugu castes, such as Balija, Golla and Kamma. Also in Andhra Pradesh and Telangana, the Naik surname is adopted as a surname by other communities, including Bedar.
- In Karnataka it is used by some subcastes of the Vokkaliga, Namadhari Naik communities. The Muslim Siddis of Karnataka, use the surname Nayaka which they received as a title from the kings of Bijapur.
- In Maharashtra the surname Nayak and Naik is used by Kshatriya Marathas, CKPs, Saraswat Brahmin and Deshastha Brahmin communities.
- Tamil Nadu, Nayakkar, Naidu or Naicker is also a surname used by Kannada, Tamil and Telugu speaking communities, in some cases as a caste affiliation. Naicker, also spelt as Nayakar, is the Tamil equivalent for the Telugu Naidu and the Sanskrit Nayaka. This title was historically bestowed upon vassals and army commanders of the Vijayanagara empire who once ruled present-day Andhra Pradesh, Karnataka, Tamil Nadu and Telangana as Nayakas and Poligars. Many places in Tamil Nadu, which were once fortified palayams like Palayamkottai that were ruled by the local Nayak poligar, have portmanteau names prefixed by the original ruling poligar's patronymic followed by "naicken and "palayam", such as Narasimhanaickenpalayam, Kamanaicken Palayam, and Thimmanayakanpalayam.

== See also ==
- Nayaka dynasties
- Vijayanagara Empire
- Poligars
