= Bhairava (disambiguation) =

Bhairava is a deity worshiped by Hindus and Buddhists.

Bhairava may also refer to:

== People ==
- Kaala Bhairava (born 1993), Indian playback singer and music director

== Arts and entertainment ==
- Bhairava, a 1994 Kannada-language film
- Bairavaa, a 2017 Tamil-language film
- Bhairava, protagonist of 2024 Indian film Kalki 2898 AD

== See also ==
- Bhairav (disambiguation)
- Bhairon (disambiguation)
- Bhairavi (disambiguation)
- Kal Bhairab (disambiguation)
- Bhairavnath (disambiguation)
