= Suraj Yengde =

Indian scholar, activist and columnist (born 1988)

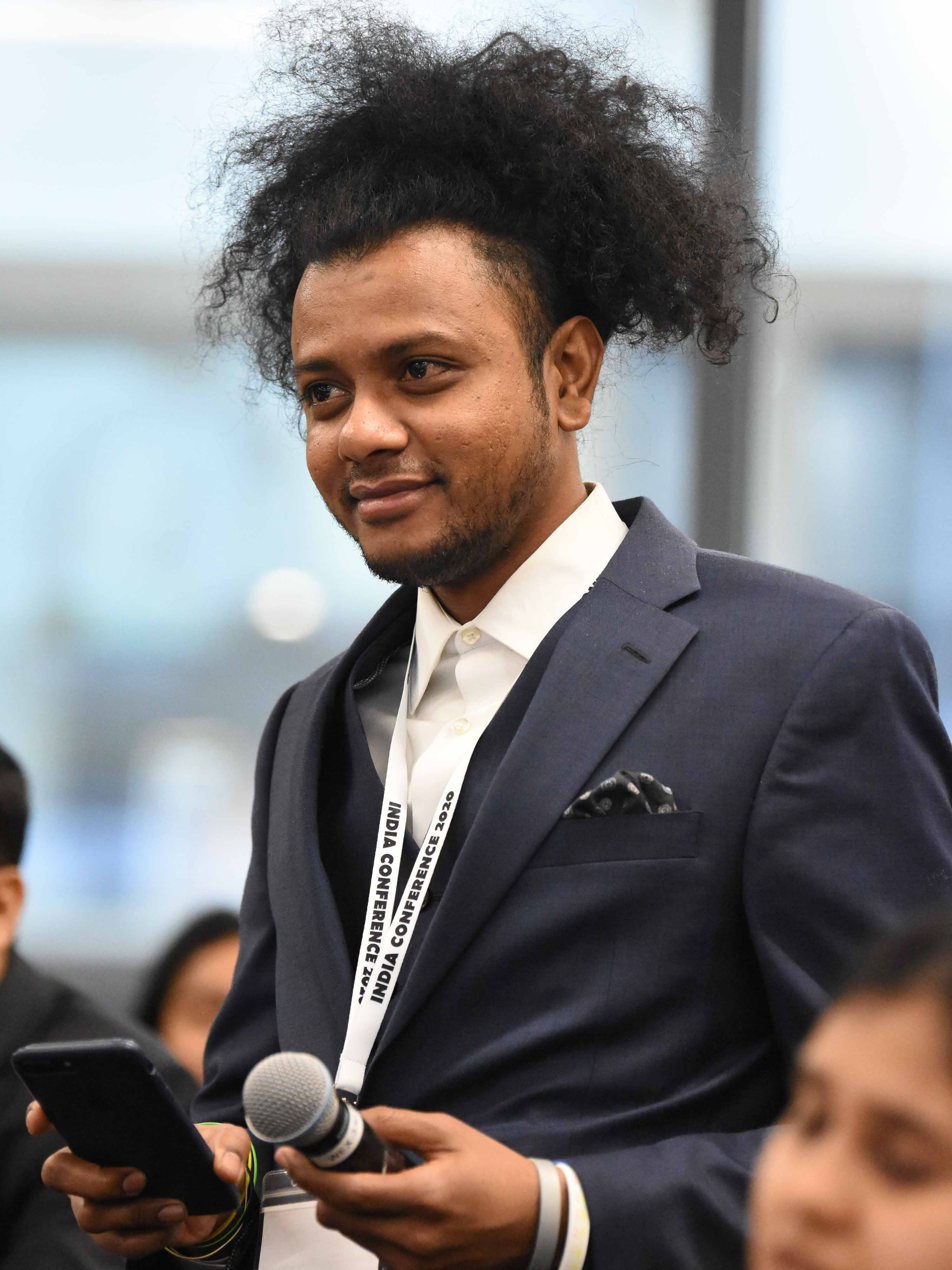
- Yengde at Harvard India Conference in Harvard, 2020
- Born: 1988 (age 37–38); Nanded, Maharashtra, India
- Occupations: Scholar; Author; Activist
- Awards: Dr. Ambedkar Social Justice Award (2019); Rohith Vemula Memorial Scholar Award (2018)

Academic background
- Education: LLM; PhD; DPhil
- Alma mater: Swami Ramanand Teerth Marathwada University (BSL and LLB); Birmingham City University (LLM); University of the Witwatersrand (PhD); University of Oxford (DPhil); Harvard University (postdoc)
- Thesis: South-south migration: an ethnographic study of an Indian business district in Johannesburg (2016)
- Doctoral advisor: Faisal Devji (Oxford); Dilip Menon (Witwatersrand)

Academic work
- Discipline: Social Sciences
- Institutions: Harvard University
- Notable works: Caste Matters; The Radical in Ambedkar
- Website: www.surajyengde.com

Suraj Milind Yengde (born 1988) is an Indian scholar, author and activist known for his work on caste and race. He is an Assistant Professor of History and Africana Studies and a Ford Foundation Presidential Fellow at the University of Pennsylvania. He was a W.E.B. Du Bois Fellow at Harvard University and a research associate in the Department of African and African American Studies. He was named as one of the "25 Most Influential Young Indians of 2021" by GQ India.

== Early life ==
Yengde was born in 1988 in Nanded, Maharashtra, to a Dalit Buddhist family. He earned a BSL and LLB from Nanded Law College between 2005 and 2010.

== Education and career ==
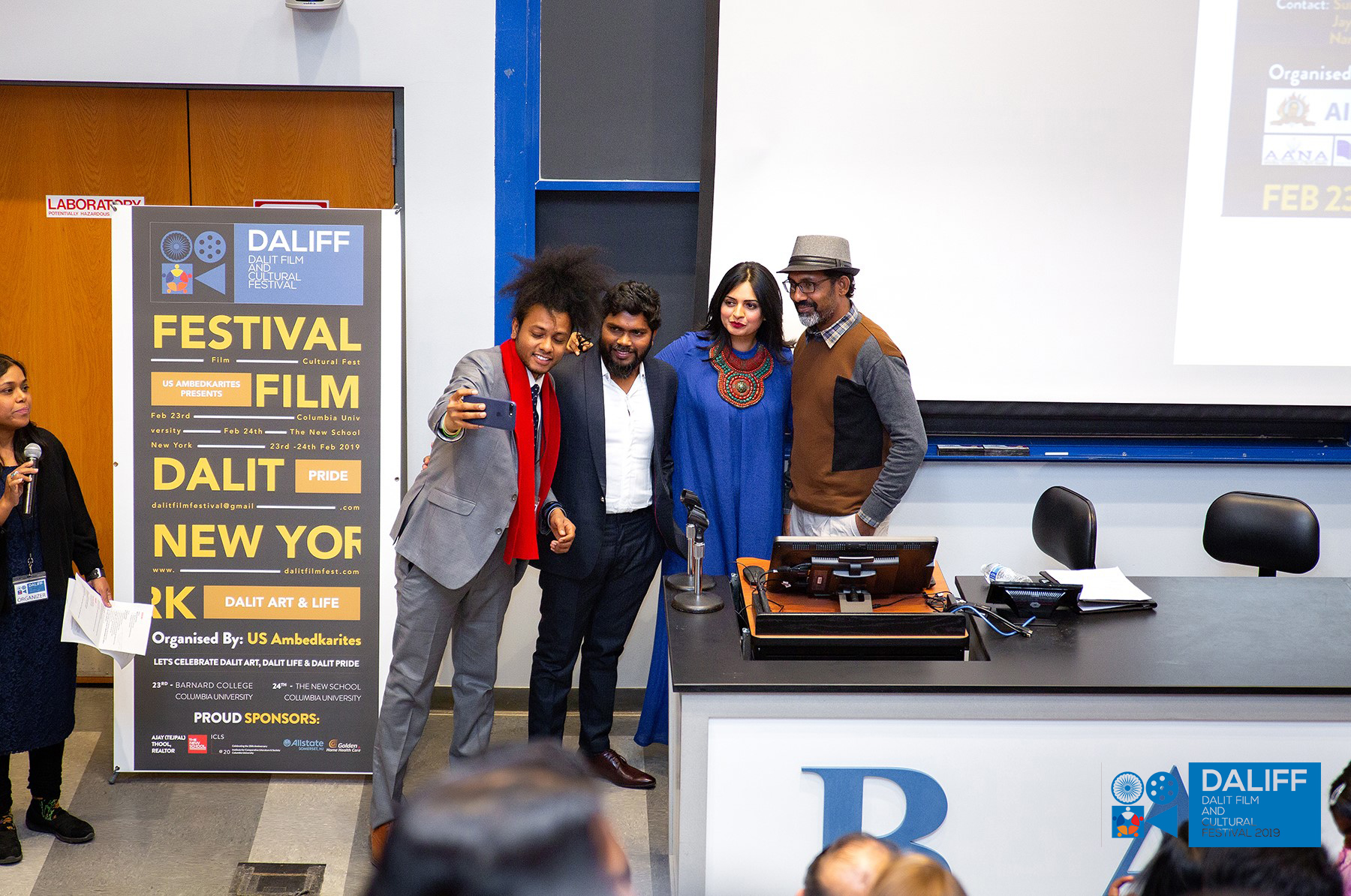
(L to R) Suraj Yengde, Pa. Ranjith, Niharika Singh, and Nagraj Manjule taking a selfie at the Dalit Film Festival in New York City in 2019.

Yengde earned an LLM from Birmingham City University, England (2011–2012) and interned at the United Nations Secretariat. He completed a PhD in Anthropology at the University of the Witwatersrand, South Africa, in 2016, with a thesis on Indian business districts in Johannesburg. He pursued further studies at the University of Oxford, focusing on caste and race. In May 2025, he received his DPhil (Doctor of Philosophy) from the University of Oxford for his thesis titled Dalit-Black Worlds: An Intellectual History of Race and Caste.

Yengde has been a post-doctoral fellow at Harvard University and a senior fellow at the Harvard Kennedy School. He has published in Economic and Political Weekly and contributes to Art Review and Hindustan Times. He appeared as himself in the 2023 biographical drama film Origin.

From January 2024 to June 2025, he was a W. E. B. Du Bois Fellow at Harvard University and a research associate in the Department of African and African American Studies. Since January 2026, he has served as an Assistant Professor of History and Africana Studies and a Ford Foundation Presidential Fellow at the University of Pennsylvania.

== Works ==
In 2018, Yengde co-edited The Radical in Ambedkar: Critical Reflections with Anand Teltumbde. In 2019, he authored Caste Matters, a book listed in The Hindu’s "Best Non-Fiction Books of the Decade". The book is published in several Indian languages with the Kerala translation winning a state award for translation. His new book Caste: A Global Story was published in May 2025.

== Awards and recognitions ==
Yengde's work has received attention in both academic and public spheres. His book Caste Matters was reviewed in major outlets such as The Hindu, The Wire, and The Polis Project, where it was described as a "powerful polemic" and "path‑breaking" in its engagement with caste and Dalit identity.

He received the Dr. Ambedkar Social Justice Award, Canada in 2019, and was one of the finalists for Sahitya Akademi Yuva Puraskar. He has been named as one of the "25 Most Influential Young Indians of 2021" by GQ, and appeared in American biographical drama film Origin (2023) as himself.

== See also ==
- Anand Teltumbde
- Dalit Panther Movement
- Black Lives Matter
- Navayana Buddhism
- BAMCEF
- Rohith Vemula
