= Bapu Velnath Thakor =

Gujarati Koli Saint

Bapu Velnathji Thakor
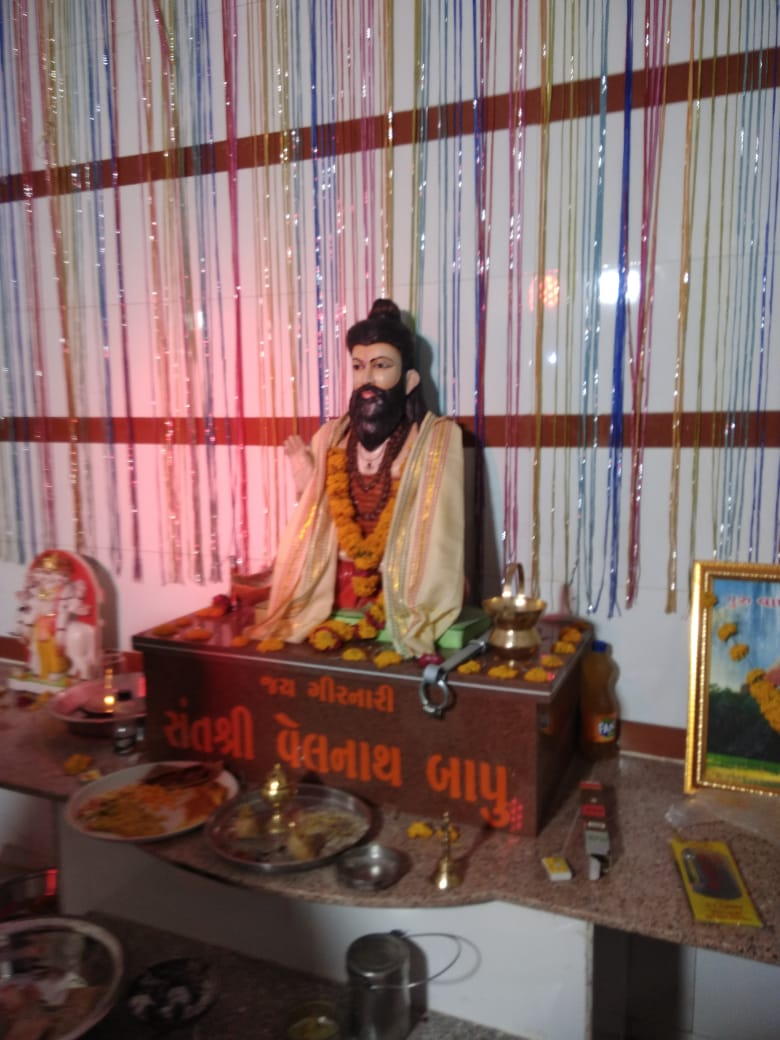
- Bapu Velnathji Thakor Temple Rajkot, Gujarat, India

Bapu
- Born: Asad Samwat; Padariya village, Jam Kandorna Tehsil, Rajkot district, Gujarat, India
- Hometown: Padariya, Gujarat
- Residence: Girnar hills, Junagadh district, Gujarat, India
- Died: Girnar hills, Junagadh, Gujarat
- Honored in: Tapa
- Major shrine: Girnar hills top in Junagadh
- Tradition or genre: Hindu

Bapu Velnathji Thakor also called as Dada Velnathji Thakor, Girnari Sant Velnathji was a 17th century Koli saint from Girnar, Gujarat. He was grandson of Amarji Thakor who was king of Chunval Pradesh.

== Early life and family ==
The Velnathi was born to a Koli saint Jodhaji Jhala and Amarbai of Padariya. His grandfather Amarji Thakor was chieftain of Padariya Jagir in Gujarat. His family clan was Jhala Makawana of Koli caste. He was married to two Rajput girls Jasubha and Minabha.

== See also ==
- Kanua Baba
- List of Koli people
- List of Koli states and clans
