= Bapuji Bhangare =

Indian freedom fighter

Patil of Devgaon Bapujirao Bhangare Bandkari
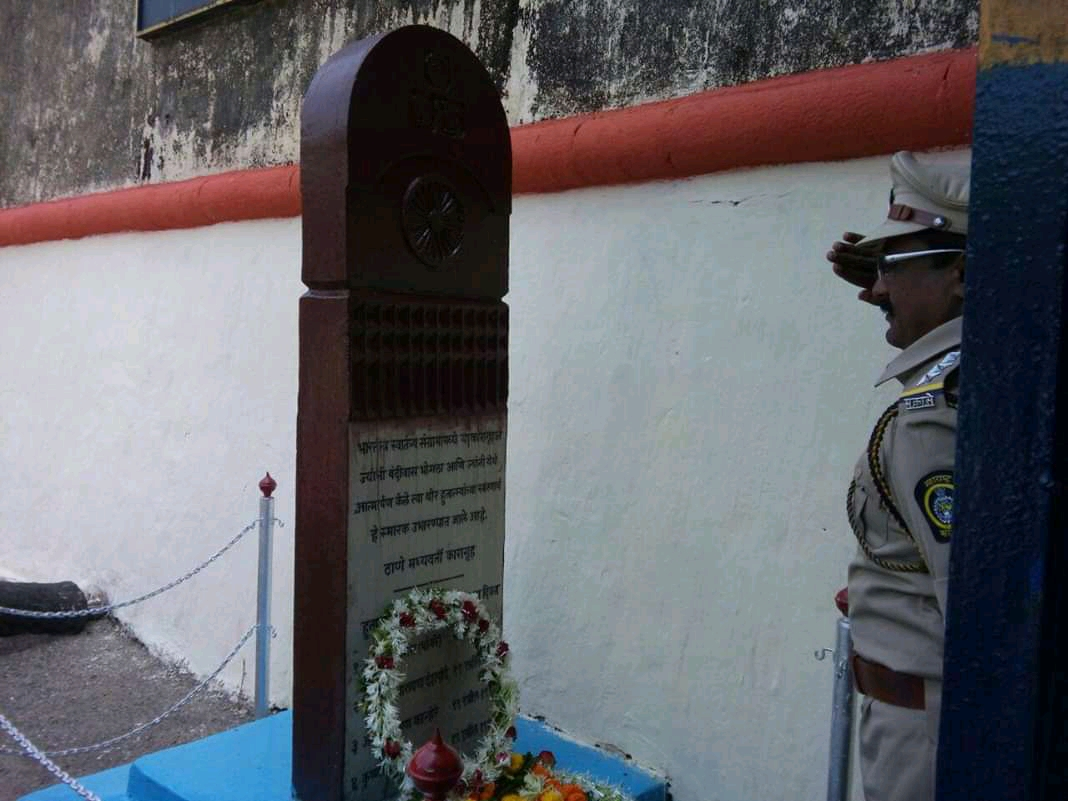
- Bapuji Bhangare Tombstone
- Born: Bapujirao Bhangare; Satewadi village, Akole Taluka, Bombay Province, British India (Maharashtra, India)
- Cause of death: Hanged
- Other name: Bapuji Patil
- Occupation: Jagirdar
- Years active: 1844 - 1848
- Era: British era
- Organization: Bandkari
- Movement: Indian independence movement
- Criminal charges: Murders, Gang Robberys, Blackmailing, Plundering
- Partner: Raghoji Bhangare (brother)
- Parent: Ramjirao Bhangare (father)
- Relatives: Javji Bamble (cousin)

Bapuji Bhangare was a Koli Patil of Deogaon and Indian freedom fighter who challenged the British government in Maharashtra state of British India. Bapuji Bhangare breakdown the British government strongly in Pune, Ahmadnagar and Nashik districts of Maharashtra.

When he was captured by British troops, he was only 26 years old. The young Jyotirao Phule may have been inspired by Bapuji Bhangare, among others.

== Early life ==
Bhangare was born to Ramji Bhangare who was Koli Patil of Devgaon, Jemadar of Ahmednagar police. Bapuji was grown up in Jawhar State because his elder brother Rama Rao Bhangare was married to the sister of Raja of Jawhar State.

== Rebellion ==
In February 1844, challenged the British government in hilly tract of Western Ghats of Konkan region of Maharashtra. Bapuji along with his revolutionary army, attacked and looted the British supporting Sahukars, Moneylenders and village Patils. In May month, attacked and plundered the villages in Akola, Igatpuri and Khed talukas because of controlled by British government. He based his revolutionary army in Koli country of Jawhar State in Konkan because his brother Rama Rao Bhangare was married to sister of Koli Raja of Jawhar State. He was fully support and shielded by ruler of Jawhar. Bapuji Bhangare along with other Koli chief Bhau Kengle levied tribute from British controlled territory. In January 1845, Bapuji attacked at Police station of Vada and captured the station but two of revolutionaries were killed in action.

Large numbers of Kolis agriculturists of the above ghat villages who were suspected of helping the Koli revolutionaries were called into Rajur and ordered to give active help to the British authorities, while their families were detained as so-called 'security' to ensure that they carried out this task. These Koli peasants were forced to abandon their villages at the time when they should have been busy preparing their fields for the first rains. The conditions in the detention centres were moreover notoriously bad: the prisoners suffered from malnourishment and there were deaths from Cholera. Put into this intolerable situation, many other Kolis also revolted against British government. By 21 June 1845, British troops sent to capture revolutionaries and around 150 revolutionaries had been either captured or killed. Most prominent amongst them was Bhau Kengle captured at that time. In August Bapu Bhangare was double-crossed by a member of Mahar caste and captured by captain Liddel. after capture of Bapuji, the rebellion was continued by his brother Raghoji Bhangare till 1848 and 2 May 1848, Raghoji also was hanged.

== Death ==
Bapuji Bhangare was captured by Captain Liddel on 18 August 1845 and sent to Ahmednagar central jail. In November, he was tried for treasury and hanged.
