= The Radical in Ambedkar =

2018 non-fiction book

The Radical in Ambedkar: Critical Reflections
- Editor: Suraj Yengde; Anand Teltumbde
- Language: English
- Subject: B. R. Ambedkar, Dalit movement, social justice
- Genre: Non-fiction, edited volume
- Published: 10 December 2018
- Publisher: Penguin Random House India
- Publication place: India
- Media type: Print (hardcover)
- Pages: 520
- ISBN: 978-0-670-09041-9

The Radical in Ambedkar: Critical Reflections is a 2018 non-fiction book edited by Suraj Yengde and Anand Teltumbde, published by Penguin Random House India. It is a collection of essays examining B. R. Ambedkar’s radical philosophy and contributions to the Dalit movement and social justice in India. The book analyzes Ambedkar’s critique of caste oppression through his 1936 work Annihilation of Caste and connects his ideas to global resistance movements.

== Summary ==
The book is a collection of essays exploring B. R. Ambedkar’s contributions to India’s social justice movements. It focuses on his critique of caste oppression in his 1936 text Annihilation of Caste, analyzing three key moments in its development. The essays highlight Ambedkar’s roles as a philosopher, activist, and jurist, and his work as the architect of the Indian Constitution. It draws parallels between Ambedkar’s anti-caste activism and global movements, such as the African-American struggle for racial equality, and critiques privileged perspectives in Ambedkar scholarship that may not fully reflect Dalit experiences.

== Development and release ==
The Radical in Ambedkar: Critical Reflections was edited by Suraj Yengde, a Dalit scholar, and Anand Teltumbde, a civil rights activist and academic. Published by Penguin Random House India in 2018, the book aims to reframe Ambedkar’s legacy by connecting his ideas to global resistance movements.

== Critical reception ==
The book was praised for its scholarly analysis. Yogesh Maitreya, in Firstpost, commended its effort to place Ambedkar’s work in the context of global resistance movements, such as the African-American struggle, but noted that some essays are limited by privileged perspectives that may not fully capture Dalit experiences. Financial Express highlighted the book’s analysis of Ambedkar’s diverse roles as a philosopher, activist, and jurist. Deccan Chronicle emphasized Ambedkar’s role as a powerful advocate for equality, noting the book’s focus on his contributions to India’s Constitution. Chinnaiah Jangam, in Economic and Political Weekly, praised the book for portraying Ambedkar as a philosopher who reshaped India’s social discourse. A York University publication appreciated the book’s focus on three key moments in Annihilation of Caste, though it suggested a need for more Dalit-centered perspectives.
