= Sagar Rajput =

Sub-caste of Rajput and Dhangar caste

The Sagar Rajput is a Hindu caste.

== History and origin ==
The Sagar Rajput caste was formerly known as Shegar Dhangar. They were shepherds and farmers by tradition. They owned more farming land than other farming communities and also held the office of the Patil prior to independence. The living informants at the time of study of this caste by scholars asserted that they changed their name to Sagar Rajput after holding a caste meeting and one of these Rajputs claimed to have gone to a Pandit in Pune who had uncovered their lineage. This lineage connected them with the Maratha ruler Malhar Rao Holkar, who was a Dhangar Shepherd and back to the Rajput Rulers of Rajasthan.

Robert Eric Frykenberg states that they were originally from the Shudra varna and successfully changed their status to twice-born by employing genealogists due to improvement in economic conditions and thus changed their name to Sagar Rajputs and started wearing the Sacred thread. They do not have any genealogical or historical evidence to support their claim of Rajput origin. This claim appears to be merely an attempt at Rajputization to assert a higher social status, even though they are Shudras, not Rajputs.

== See also ==
- Rajputization
