= Gadchiroli clash =

Engagement between Indian state forces and local insurgents

- Part of Naxalite-Maoist insurgency
Date	13 November 2021
Location	Gadchiroli district, Maharashtra, India
Result	Indian victory

Belligerents
India: Maharashtra Police	Communist Party of India (Maoist)

Commanders and leaders
(India) Bhagat Singh Koshyari	Milind Teltumbde †

Units involved
C-60 Force	Unknown

Casualties and losses
3 injured	26 killed

On 13 November 2021, Indian state forces engaged with Maoist insurgents, resulting in the Gadchiroli clash. The firefight lasted for 10 hours, and the Indian forces successfully managed to clear the area, killing 26 insurgents while only sustaining 3 injuries. One of the insurgents killed was Milind Teltumbde, one of the senior commanders of the Naxalite insurgency.

== Background ==
The Naxalite–Maoist insurgency is an ongoing conflict between Maoist groups known as Naxalites or Naxals (a group of communists supportive of Maoist political sentiment and ideology) and the Indian government. The influence zone of the Naxalites is called the red corridor, which has been steadily declining in terms of geographical coverage and number of violent incidents, and in 2021, according to the Press Information Bureau, it was confined to the 25 "most affected" locations, accounting for 85% of Left Wing Extremism (LWE) violence, and 70 "total affected" districts (down from 180 in 2009) across 10 states in two coal-rich, remote, forested hilly clusters in and around the Dandakaranya-Chhattisgarh-Odisha region and the tri-junction area of Jharkhand-Bihar and-West Bengal. The Naxalites have frequently targeted police and government workers in what they say is a fight for improved land rights and more jobs for neglected agricultural labourers and the poor.

== Firefight ==
The Indian state forces had been tipped off about Maoist activity in the dense forests of eastern Maharashtra. When Indian special forces scouted the area, they were subject to indiscriminate fire by Maoist insurgents. The Indian forces reciprocated, and killed 26 insurgents in just 10 hours, while only three Indian servicemen were injured, who were then subsequently airlifted to a local hospital in Nagpur.

== Aftermath ==
The clash was successful for the Indian forces, who neutralised Milind Teltumbde, the ‘backbone’ of the Naxalite insurgency, at little cost.

As a result of this operation, along with many others, the Maoist insurgents have been losing influence, with Maoist violence subsiding by 77% from 2009 to 2021.
