= Milind Teltumbde =

Indian Maoist politician (died 2021)

- Died: 13 November 2021; Mardintola
- Known for: Leader of CPI (Maoist)

Milind Baburao Teltumbde (died 13 November 2021) was an Indian Maoist insurgent leader and Central Committee member of CPI (Maoist). He is the younger brother of Dalit activist and scholar Anand Teltumbde. He was killed in the Gadchiroli clash.

== Career ==
Teltumbde was born in Rajur, Yavatmal district. In 1980s he completed ITI course and joined as a technician in Western Coalfields Limited in Chandrapur. Since then he was involved with Naxalite movement as an activist of Peoples War Group. He was the member of Akhil Maharashtra Kamgar Union.

Teltumbde became the secretary of Maharashtra unit of Communist Party of India (Maoist) and was appointed Central Committee Member of this party. He was the head of the Maharashtra-Madhya Pradesh-Chhattisgarh zone to create a safe red corridor for Maoist.

According to the police officials, he was the prime financier of the 2018 Bhima Koregaon violence. Teltumbde was among the 26 Naxals killed in an encounter with Maharashtra Police in Mardintola forest area of Gadchiroli district on 13 November 2021. He was wanted in 63 criminal cases and carried 50 lakh reward on his head at the time of his death.
