= Sarnaik =

Sarnaik is a surname. Notable people with the surname include:

- Arun Sarnaik (1935–1984), Indian actor and singer
- Khemirao Sarnaik (1605–1650), Indian warrior
- Pratap Sarnaik (born 1964), Indian politician
