= Vinchurkar family =

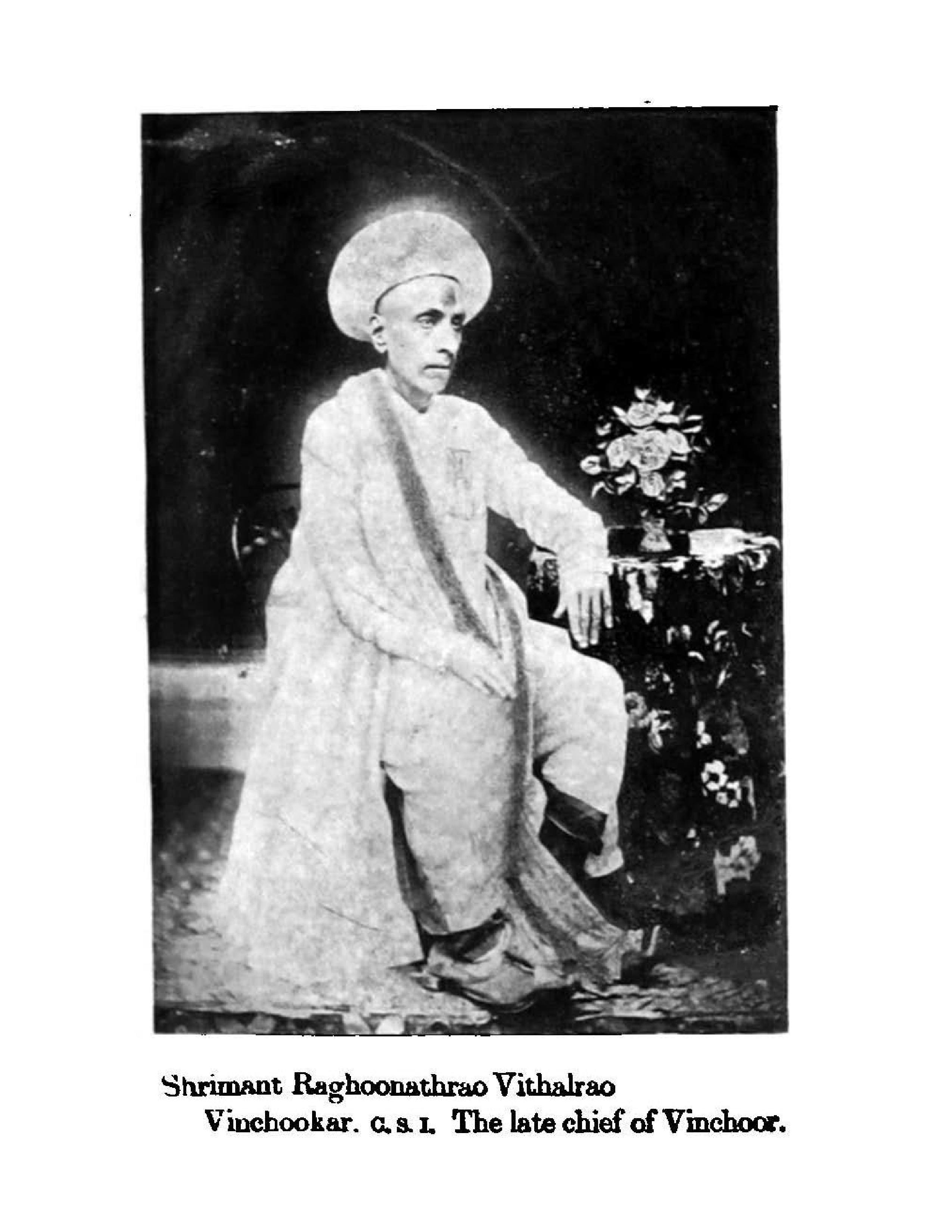
- Current region: Pune, India
- Etymology: Native of Vinchur
- Origin: Vinchur, Nasik District, Maharashtra, India
- Members: Vitthal Shivdev Vinchurkar; Khanderao Vinchurkar; Narsig Khanderao Vinchurkar; Vithalrao Vinchurkar; Raghunathrao Vitthal Vinchurkar; Krishnarao Vitthal Vinchurkar; Madhavrao Vithal Vinchurkar
- Connected families: Pant Sachiv family of Bhor
- Estate: Vinchur estate

The Vinchurkar family (née Daani) is a prominent Maratha family of Nobles, Sardars, Patil, Jagirdars, Mankaris of Vinchur during Maratha Empire, East India Company and British Raj times.

The Vinchurkar Family surname has been derived from the town of Vinchur that they resided in. The original surname of the family was "Daani", belonging to the Deshashtha Marathi Brahmin caste. The father of Vitthal Vinchurkar, Shivdev Daani originally hailed from the village of Saswad, he worked as an accounts keeper in a grains store.

== History ==
=== Under Maratha Empire ===
The Vinchurkar family rose to importance in the middle of the eighteenth century when Vitthal Shivdev Vinchurkar was at its head, he distinguished himself at the siege of Ahmadabad in 1755, and accompanied the Maratha army in the fatal expedition which ended in the defeat of Panipat. The Vinchurkars hail from Vinchur village of Maratha Empire (now part of Maharashtra). However Nasik district was the home of the well-known Sardar Vinchurkar family. The Vinchurkars held forty five villages in Nasik as well as elsewhere in Maratha Empire of which Yeola was one.

The Vinchurkar family also played a crucial role in the Third Battle of Panipat which took place on 14 January 1761, Where the army of Marathas fought Afghan invader Ahmad Shah Durrani.

Vitthal Narsingh Vinchurkar was the Sardar of Peshwa and one of the grandees in the Maratha Empire who continued to be loyal to Peshwa almost to the bitter end. The Vinchurkars have their land of Inams and Vatans in Khandesh.

=== Under East India Company ===
After the defeat of Peshwa Bajirao II by Maharaj Yashwantrao Holkar at the Battle of Poona, Bajirao II fled the battle and sought British protection (who were the enemies of Maratha Empire), and in December 1802, concluded the Treaty of Bassein with the British East India Company, ceding territory for the maintenance of a subsidiary force and agreeing to treaty with no other power. This provoked the Second Anglo-Maratha War that began the breakup of the Maratha confederacy. Holkar appointed Amrutrao as the Peshwa and went to Indore on 13 March 1803.

When Bajirao II surrendered to John Malcolm, Vitthal Narsing Vinchurkar was present. He tendered his submission to Sir John Malcolm when his master the Peshwa accepted the Malcolm's terms.

Sir John Malcolm believed that Narsing Vinchurkar was to a large extent responsible for influencing Bajirao II for accepting the Malcolm's terms. According to these terms jagir of Vinchurkars was restored to them by the British.

The British reinstated Bajirao II as the Peshwa at Pune on 13 May 1803. During his second reign of Bajirao II began the Third Anglo-Maratha War. After the defeat at the Battle of Koregaon in January 1818, The British took over his dominion and made the Maratha King Pratap Singh of Satara declare in favour of the British. This ended the Peshwa's legal position as head of the Maratha confederacy.

=== Under British Raj ===
The Vinchurkars are classified as first class Sardars under British Raj. One of the member of Vinchurkar family, Sardar Madhavrao Vitthal Vinchurkar along with Jagannath Shankarsheth, and Rushtomji Jamshedji were appointed to the Council of the Governor of Bombay. Sardar Raghunathrao Vitthal Vinchurkar was the Jagirdar of Vinchur. He was awarded the title Umdut-ul-Mulk by the British Raj. Raghunathrao Vinchurkar was also awarded the medal Order of the Star of India (C.S.I) by the British for his excellence in the service. Sardar Krishnarao Vitthal Vinchurkar was appointed as Sub-Judge as 1st Class under 2nd Grade for Satara by the British Raj.

Note: The names mentioned above Sardar Bahadur Raghunathrao Vitthal Vinchurkar, Sardar Krishnarao Vitthal Vinchurkar and Sardar Madhavrao Vitthal Vinchurkar are the sons of Sardar Bahadur Vitthal Shivdev Vinchurkar. Original Family name being Daani.

== Family tree ==
The family tree of Vinchurkar family is collected from the book Brief story of the Vinchoorkar family by S. R. Vinchoorkar.

=== First generation ===
- Vitthal Shivdev – founder of Vinchurkar family

=== Second generation ===
- Shivaji Vitthal
- Narsinghrao
- Malharrao
- Bajirao
- Khanderao

=== Third generation ===
- Narsing Khanderao – son of Khanderao

=== Fourth generation ===
- Vitthalrao – Son of Narsing Khanderao

=== Fifth generation ===
Vitthalrao married and had three sons

- Raghunathrao
- Krishnarao
- Madhavrao
