= Bhairavnath =

Bhairavnath may refer to:

- Bhairava, a fierce manifestation of Lord Shiva
- Bhairav (tantrik), a tantrik known as Bhairavnath, associated with shrine of Vaishno Devi
- Bairavanathar Temple, Thagattur, temple dedicated to Bhairava in Tamil Nadu, India

== See also ==
- Bhairav (disambiguation)
- Bhairava (disambiguation)
