= Caste Matters =

2019 book by Suraj Yengde

- Author: Suraj Yengde
- Language: English
- Subject: Caste, Dalit identity, Social justice
- Genre: Non-fiction
- Published: 15 July 2019
- Publisher: Penguin Random House India
- Publication place: India
- Media type: Print
- Pages: 304
- ISBN: 978-9-353-05582-0

Caste Matters is a 2019 non-fiction book by Dalit scholar and activist Suraj Yengde, published by Penguin Random House India on 15 July 2019. It examines the persistence of caste in modern India, focusing on Dalit identity, systemic oppression, and intersections with love, culture, and the global diaspora. Combining personal narrative and sociological analysis, the book challenges caste denialism and advocates for Dalit emancipation. A Marathi translation was published in 2022, and the book’s Chennai launch included endorsements from figures like Kanhaiya Kumar. Critics praised its accessibility and bold approach, though some noted its occasionally fragmented structure.

== Summary ==
Caste Matters blends personal narrative with socio-political analysis to explore the caste system in India. Yengde, a first-generation Dalit scholar from Nanded, Maharashtra, recounts his experiences of caste-based discrimination, such as being reprimanded for using an upper-caste toilet during his childhood. He critiques the systemic exclusion of Dalits in Indian institutions, including politics, bureaucracy, and the judiciary, attributing these barriers to the influence of Brahmanism. Yengde introduces "Dalit love" as a concept of resilience and compassion rooted in Dalit community bonds, potentially drawing from Buddhist principles. The book also addresses internal divisions within the Dalit community, critiquing those who distance themselves from their Dalit identity or fail to support the broader anti-caste movement. Yengde draws parallels between caste oppression and global forms of discrimination, such as racism, and calls for solidarity among marginalized groups. He urges Brahmin allies to actively support the anti-caste struggle, citing historical examples of Brahmins who worked with Jyotirao Phule and B. R. Ambedkar.

== Development and release ==
Suraj Yengde wrote Caste Matters to address the lack of mainstream discourse on caste in India, inspired by the works of Jyotirao Phule and B. R. Ambedkar. The book was published by Penguin Random House India on 22 July 2019 and launched at an event in Chennai.

== Critical reception ==
Caste Matters received generally positive reviews for its bold narrative and accessibility. G. Sampath of The Hindu described it as a "significant intervention in discrimination studies," praising its appeal to Dalit readers and its potential to educate progressive savarnas about caste realities. The reviewer highlighted Yengde’s concept of "Dalit love" as a novel framework for understanding Dalit resilience, though noting that some readers might find it abstract. Urmi Chanda-Vaz of Scroll.in commended the book’s unapologetic tone, stating that it "calls out the caste elephant in every room" and effectively blends personal anecdotes with broader social critique. The Economic and Political Weekly appreciated Yengde’s effort to globalize the Dalit narrative by drawing parallels with movements like Black Lives Matter, but questioned the book’s occasional lack of historical nuance in its analysis of caste origins. Reviewers also noted that Yengde’s generalizations about intra-Dalit dynamics, such as his critique of "elite Dalits," could be divisive within the community.
