= Bhairavi (disambiguation) =

Bhairavi is a Hindu goddess associated with the Mahavidyas.

Bhairavi may also refer to:

== Music ==
- Bhairavi (thaat), a basic thaat of Hindustani music from the Indian subcontinent
- Bhairavi (Hindustani), a Hindustani classical heptatonic (Sampurna) raga
- Bhairavi (Carnatic), a janya rāgam in Carnatic music

== People ==
- Bhairavi Desai, founder of the New York Taxi Workers Alliance
- Bhairavi Goswami (born 1984), Indian actress and television host
- Bhairavi Raichura, Indian television actress

== Other uses ==
- Bhairavi (film), a 1998 Indian Hindi-language romantic film
- Bairavi, a 1978 Indian film by M. Bhaskar
- Bhairabi River, India
- Bhairabi Temple, a Hindu temple in India

== See also ==
- Bhairava (disambiguation)
- Bhairav (disambiguation)
- Bairabi, a town in Mizoram, India
