= Bhairon =

Bhairon may refer to:

- Bhairava, an aspect of the Indian god Siva
- Bhaironji, a Hindu god of the underworld
- Bhairav (raga), Indian raga
- Bhairon Singh Shekhawat, Vice President of India from 2002 to 2007

== See also ==
- Bhairava (disambiguation)
- Bhairav (disambiguation)
