= Lasalgaon =

- Census town
- Location in Maharashtra, India
- Coordinates: 20.15°N 74.24°E
- Country: India
- State: Maharashtra
- District: Nashik

Government
  - Type: grampanchayat
- Elevation: 581 m (1,906 ft)

Population (2001)
  - Total: 25,525

Language
  - Official: Marathi
- Time zone: UTC+5:30 (IST)
- PIN: 422306
- Vehicle registration: MH 15

Lasalgaon is a census town in the Nashik District of Maharashtra state, India.

== Geography ==
Lasalgaon is located at 20.15°N 74.23°E. It has an average elevation of 581 metres (1906 feet).

== Demographics ==
As of 2001 India census, Lasalgaon had a population of 25,525. Males constitute 52% of the population and females 48%. Lasalgaon has an average literacy rate of 77%, higher than the national average of 59.5%: male literacy is 82%, and female literacy is 72%. In Lasalgaon, 11% of the population is under 6 years of age.

== Onion Market ==
Lasalgaon has a prominent onion market. Coordinates: 20° 8'27.74"N, 74°13'24.44"E. The onions from Lasalgaon Market are transported to many places in India and exported to many countries in the world. The Bhabha Atomic Research Centre (BARC) processes onions to keep them fresh for a long time. Lasalgaon is famous for Wine Grapes. Vinchur, which is about 5 km from Lasalgaon, is also known as "Wine Manufacturing city". National Horticultural Research and Development Foundation Lasalgaon ( NHRDF ) developed varieties of Onion and Garlic in its center. The NHRDF under its development program produces and distributes quality seed of Onion and Garlic to the farmers as a service.

Lasalgaon is also famous for Ahilyadevi Holkar's fort located in the center of the city built in the 17th century.

Lasalgaon railway station is available for the transportation of daily commuters, businessmen and many others towards Nashik, Mumbai and Manmad.

== Geographical indication ==
Lasalgaon onion was awarded the Geographical Indication (GI) status tag from the Geographical Indications Registry, under the Union Government of India, on 31 March 2016 and is valid until 28 November 2031.

Baliraja Shetkari Gat from Lasalgaon, proposed the GI registration of Lasalgaon onion. After filing the application in November 2021, the Onion was granted the GI tag in 2023 by the Geographical Indication Registry in Chennai, making the name "Lasalgaon onion" exclusive to the Onion grown in the region. It thus became the second onion variety from India after Bangalore Rose Onion of Karnataka and the 17th type of goods from Maharashtra to earn the GI tag.

The GI tag protects the onion from illegal selling and marketing, and gives it legal protection and a unique identity.
