= Govind Rao Khare =

Indian freedom fighter from Maharashtra

Sardar, Subedar Naik Govind Rao Khare Bandkari
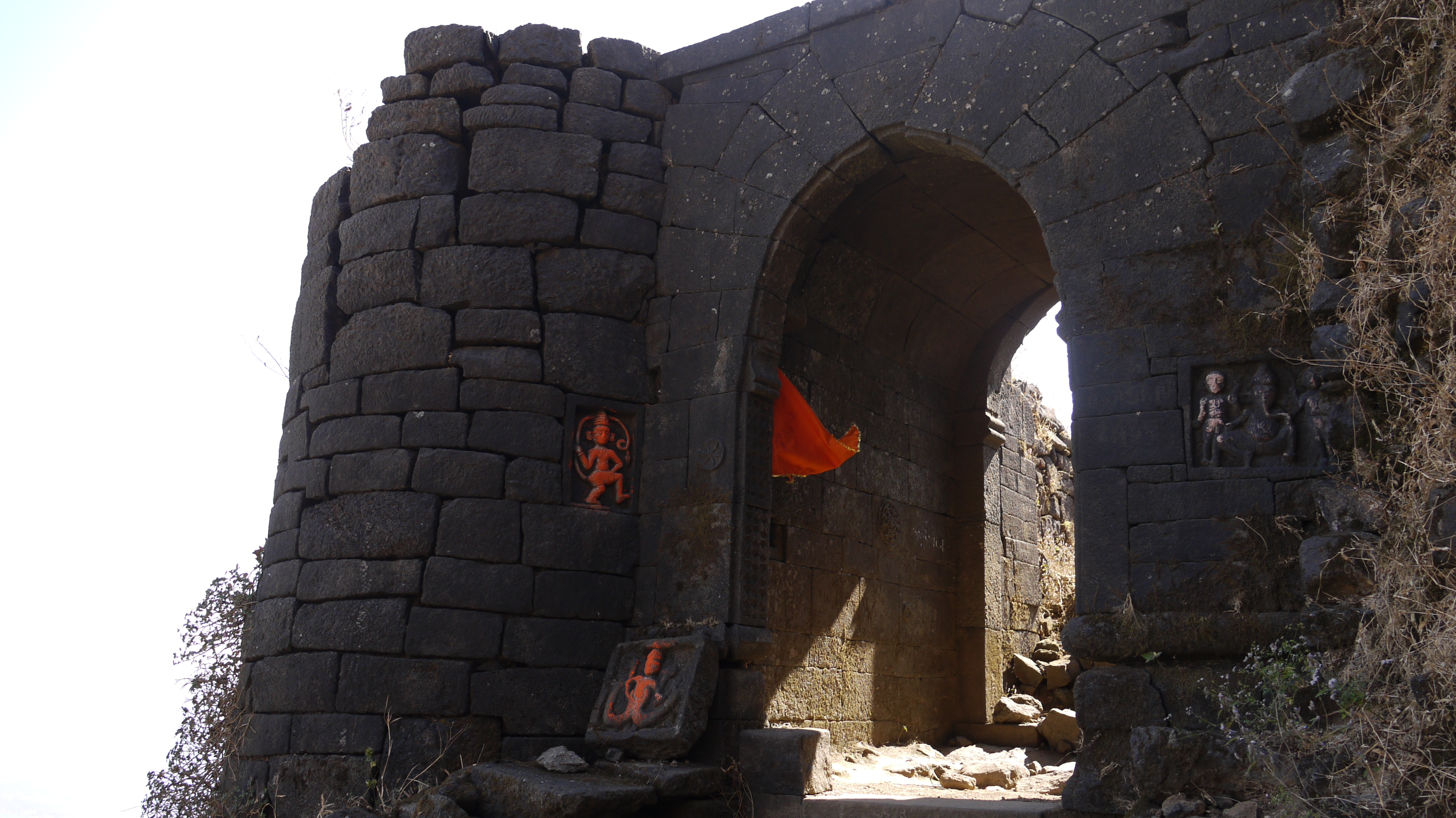
- Entrance of Ratangad fort
- Born: Koligarh, Ratangarh, Maratha Empire
- Died: 1830; Ahmednagar Central Jail, Ahmednagar, British India
- Military career
- Allegiance: Maratha Empire
- Branch: Maratha Army
- Rank: Subedar of Ratangad fort
- Unit: Mavala
- Other work: Indian independence movement

Naik Govind Rao Khare was the Subedar of the hill fort Ratangarh under Peshwa government in the Maratha Empire. He was born in a farming family of Maharashtra. Khare was a revolutionary of the Indian independence movement who took up arms against the British rule in Maharashtra and declared the end of British rule. he was chief of the Kolis of Khare (Khade) clan and belong to the Mahadev koli family and led the rebellion from 1819 to 1830. his family was chief of the four villages and was tributary to peshwa and enjoying the Deshmukhi.

In 1818, there was a war between the Maratha Empire and the British Government (Mahar Regiment ), in which the Maratha Empire was defeated, even after this Khare remained loyal to the Peshwa. After that, Khare received a proposal from the British government for the position of Subedar, but Khare declined to the proposal. After this, the government snatched the land of 12 relatives of Khare, on which they had been claiming rights since the time of Shivaji, as well as the British were doing the same with other local people, due to the reason Khare and 12 Kolis united other Kolis and joined the Khare and rebelled against government.

== Freedom movement ==
After announce of the revolt of Khare, he formed his revolutionary army and made a center in the hilly areas. A lot of Kolis were associated with Khare as well as Ramji Bhangre who was father of Raghoji Bhangare and came from Konkan, also joined Khare and attacked the government's treasury in the very first attempt. The British government sent Captain Mackintosh with the Bombay Army to capture the rebels, but Mackintosh was not able to fight against Khare, so he planned to gather complete information about the rebels. Mackintosh engaged the army in the Western Ghats to gather information. All the people were on the side of the revolutionaries, so no one supported the British, but some Chitpavan Brahmins gave a lot of information to the British officials.

In 1830, Captain Mackintosh sent an army from the Akola hills, where many British soldiers were killed in encounter between the Revolutionary Army and the British Army, but Captain Mackintosh was far from success. Khare and Ramji Bhangre escaped easily. But after some time there was an encounter again where Khare was taken in Ahmednagar Central Jail and sentenced to death.

== See also ==
- Khade Koli
- List of Marathi people
- List of Koli states and clansl
