= Govindas Ramdas =

Member of the Koli tribe who led rebels against the British East India Company

Bhagat Govindas Ramdas
- ગોવિંદાસ રામદાસ
- Died: 1830; Dakor, British Raj
- Cause of death: Hanged
- Occupation: Priest
- Years active: 1826 - 1830
- Era: British era
- Movement: Indian Independence movement
- Opponent: Britishers
- Criminal charges: Murder; Looting; Blackmailing

The Govindas Ramdas was a Koli Bhagat who led Koli rebels against the British East India Company between 1826 and 1830. His followers thought that he had supernatural powers. Little is known of him but on the night of 17 March 1826, he led 500 armed followers into Thasra, near Dakor, and established himself as ruler.
