= Bhairavgad =

Fort in India

- Near Patan, Satara district, Maharashtra, India
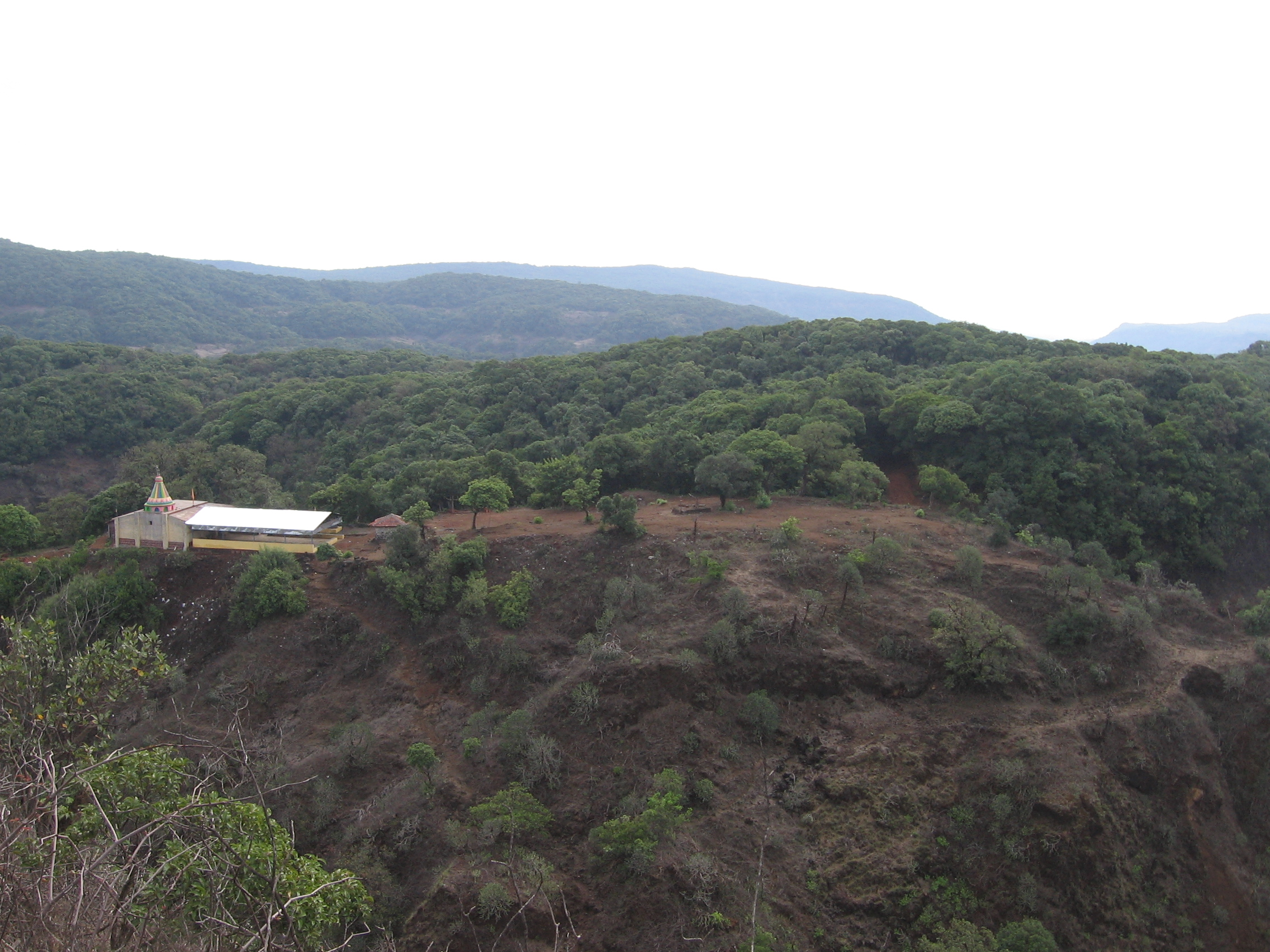

Site information
- Type: Fort
- Owner: Government of Maharashtra
- Open to the public: Yes
- Condition: Ruined

Location
- Location in Maharashtra
- Coordinates: 17.325219°N 73.675196°E

Bhairavgad is a fort in India, twenty miles south-west of Patan, Satara district of Maharashtra. The fort is situated on a peak of Sahyadri range. The fort has a temple of Bhairav (Shiva); from which it gets its name. It is located at an altitude of about 1000 meters.

The fort has been described by James Grant Duff in his posthumously published book of 1863, History of the Mahrattas. The fort was built by Rajas of Panhala and was used by Marathas. It was later captured by British on 23 May 1818.
