= Bhairav (Gujarat) =

Bhairav is a village in Surat district of Gujarat, India. It is situated on the bank of the Tapti River.
