= Kal Bhairab =

Kal Bhairab may refer to:

- Bhairava, the fierce manifestation of Lord Shiva associated with annihilation
- Kal Bhairab, Nepal, a place in Nepal

== See also ==
- Bhairav (disambiguation)
