= Hatkar =

Hindu caste in Maharashtra

Hatkar is a Hindu Kshatriya caste found in the Deccan region of India. Their home language is Marathi.Hatkars, from the Marathwada region, Hatkar Kshatriya and trace their ancestry to warrior lineages.

Hatkar is also a surname used by Saraswat Brahmins in Maharashtra, which is entirely different from the Hatkar caste.

Most Hatkars from the Marathwada region are regarded as Kshatriya and historically served as soldiers and warriors under various Deccan and Maratha rulers, reflecting their martial heritage. Some members of the Hatkar community practised pastoral occupations and agriculture. Hatkar caste members primarily reside in the Marathwada and Vidarbha regions of Maharashtra.

== History ==
=== Medieval Era ===
The Ain-i-Akbari describes Hatkars as being "a proud, refractory and domineering race of Marathas, living in the Basim Sircar and, with numerous armed forces, occupying the forts and controlling the surrounding districts". Furthermore, It mentions a Hatkar force of 1,000 cavalry and 5,000 infantry.

Hatkars were in the army of Shivaji in large numbers and were known for their bravery in the Maratha Empire. "Naik" and "Rao" were the titles given to them.

Syed Siraj-ul-Hassan describes them as "strong built and vigorous frame, generally of dark complexion, with a bold and haughty demeanour and are the stuff of which good soldiers are made". Moreover, They show a marked difference from Kunbis.

=== The Hatkar Rebellion of 1819 ===
Under the leadership of Novsaji Naik, the community of Hatkars had captured a number of strongholds in Nanded and Berar, which was under the Nizam of Hyderabad. They were a dread to the Nizam – they started a rebellion which was going on for 20 years. After the Third Anglo-Maratha War, Nizam called on British Indian Army to retake the possessions. Novsaji put up a strong resistance with the assistance of 500 Arab soldiers and a siege ensued. The Siege of Nowah continued for 23 days before it was put down. British force consisted of 3782 soldiers and 252 artillery. The siege was of such considerable significance that the word Nowah was displayed on the badges of the regiments which participated in the siege.

== Social standing ==
According to Hassan, in point of social standing the Hatkars rank with the Maratha, with whom they exchange kachi (uncooked) food. The Hatkar males and females dress and decorate themselves like the Maratha . The marriage ceremony of the Hatkars differs little from that in vogue among the Kunbis. Deshastha Brahmins are employed as priests in religious and ceremonial observances.

Primary occupation of Hatkars is farming. In the past, the Hatkars were cultivators and held land-tenures of different grades. They were patil, Inamdars and Deshmukh, or occupancy and non-occupancy raiyats and landless day-labourers.

== Culture ==
There is an expression, "Hatkar's flag", referring to the community’s distinctive emblem. The Hatkar flag is similar to the traditional Maratha saffron (kesari) flag — a saffron/orange, sparrow-tailed (swallow-tailed) battle-flag.[1] [full citation needed]

The favourite object of worship among Hatkars is Khandoba, to whom offerings of flowers and sweetmeats are made every Sunday. They observe major Hindu festivals, including Holi (Shimga) in March and Dussehra in October, both held in great importance.[9]

Traditionally, Hatkars are known for wearing a red turban, earrings, and a coarse blanket, and for carrying a staff. Hatkar women commonly wear numerous ornaments such as rings, necklaces, nose rings, and ankle bangles.[12]
