= Vinchur =

Vinchur India's first Wine Park
- Town
- Location within Maharashtra
- Coordinates: 20.1069°N 74.2243°E
- Country: India
- State: Maharashtra
- District: Nashik
- Subdistrict: Niphad

Government
  - Type: grampanchayat

Population (2011)
  - Total: 12,427
- Time zone: UTC+05:30 (IST)
- Pincode: 422305

Vinchur is a small town in Niphad Tehsil of Nashik district, Maharashtra, India. Vinchur is located near to the Lasalgaon City and state highway Nashik to Sambhaji Nagar. One of the biggest MIDC is situated in Vinchur near Nashik city. Nearest Railway station Lasalgaon is only 5kms from Vinchur. Vinchur is known for grape, onion, sugarcane and vegetables the town is also good for residential and industrial area.

Historically, Vinchur is primarily known for the residential palace of Sardar Vinchurkar who was one of the pillars of Maratha Empire. The original patriarch of the family, Vitthal Shivdev started by working in stables of Chhatrapati Shahu I (Satara State) and after 7 yrs upon seeing his valour in warfare, he was sent to work with Peshwa Bajirao I. Vinchur was capital of Sardar Vinchurkar with area ranging from Yeola to Nashik. In 1761, Sardar Vitthal Rao Vinchurkar was injured in the 3rd Battle of Panipat. He fought multiple battles alongside Peshwas till his death on 20 August 1767. He was a close friend of Sardar Malhar Rao Holkar and had great respect and regard for Chhatrapati Shivaji and his values.

The Wada (palace) of Vinchurkar is still present in Vinchur; dilapidated and in the possession of Darekars.

Vinchur is now known for its presence on Aurangabad-Nashik highway and famous for its grapes and dedicated industrial area for winery. it also known for onion sub market under the provision of Lasalgaon onion market which is Asia's biggest onion market. It is also known for best weather in Maharashtra. Most of the land belonged to the Sardar Vinchurkar family.

The primary occupation is agriculture.

A large fort is located in the center of town.
