= Gawali Dialect of Melghat =

Regional dialect of Melghat

It was thought that Ahirani or Khandeshi dialect is spoken in Old Khandesh district. Now old Khandesh District of Maharashtra is divided in several districts. Those are Jalgaon district, Dhule district, Nandurbar district, Part of Nasik district and part of Aurangabad district. Ahiras spoke Ahirani dialect. Ahir Wani means dialect of Ahiras. Wani means dialect. It is known as Ahirani as it was spoken by Ahiras. Same dialect in this region is known as Khandeshi dialect. Because it is dialect of old Khandesh district. Khandeshi is regional name and Ahirani is social name for same dialect. Ahirani was spoken within the basin of Satpura Range and Sanhyadri Range. High picks of Satpuda, of Western Ghats (Chandwad and Ajanta) did not allowed to spread this dialect out of this closed area of Khandesh district. But similar dialect having similar social rituals, similar lexicography, phonology and syntax newly foundout by Dr. Ramesh Suryawanshi in Melghat area of Amravati district. Near about fifty villages where Gawali people reside speak Gawali dialect. This dialect was not included in Griererson's Survey of India or G. N. Devy's recent Bhasha Surveykshan. Gavali dialect and Ahirani dialect are same and one. Ahiras of Khandesh as well as Gawali of Melghat claim as they belong to Krishna's family. Both having back history of having relation with Asirgarh Fort, and Goddess Asha Devi. Both are cowherds indulged in business of milk and cattle. Gawali's of Malghat are not literate and reside in forest. Ahiras reside in towns and villages which are connected to metrocities with roads and railways. Ahiras left most of their past rituals and traditions. Ahiras of Khandesh nowadays are known by their business where as Gawalis are milkmen and cowherds. Most of their surnames are different. Gavali's of Melghat give milk and milk products free of cost to villagers with rotation as per their Surnames. It is considered that Gawali family of Shaniware Surname should distribute milk and milk products free of cost on Saturday. (Shaniwar is word for Saturday) Gavali reside in Paratwada, Chandur, Melghat, Amravati, Yavatmal Chimur tehsils of Vidarbha. A legend discloses history of Gawali's migration to Melghat area. Krishna went to Kaundanyapur with these Gawalis along with their several cattle. As lord Krishna returned with his beloved Rukmini from Kaundinyapur. Some Gawalis with their cattle decided to reside therein Melghat area as it was rich grassy land, good for their cattle. This legendary story discloses the fact that Ahiras of Khandesh and Gawalis of Melghat both are of same race. So their dialect is same and one. This face is just disclosed by Dr. Ramesh Suryawanshi in his article published in Critical Enquiry Vol.VI Issue IV. Oct.- Dec. 2014 by Institute of Knowledge Engineering.
