= Bhairavgad (fort) =

Military fort in Maharashtra, India

- Maharashtra, India

Site information
- Type: Fortress
- Condition: In ruins

Location
- Coordinates: 17°20′54.91″N 73°40′31.65″E

Bhairavgad fort is located in the Sahyadri mountains of the Indian state of Maharashtra. Multiple mountains are named Bhairavgad including one near the Karad-Chiplun area, one near Malshej Ghat and third in the Bhandardara region in the neighborhood of Ghanchakkar the third highest peak of Sahyadris.

== Geography ==
Bhairavgad is located in Shirpunje village 27 km from Rajur in the Akole taluka of Ahmednagar district.

Bhairavgad is accessible from Shirpunje village and Ambit village.

The fort is part of Kalsubai-Harishchandragad Wildlife Sanctuary and is covered by dense trees.

Many water tanks sit at the top of the hill, one containing potable water.

== History ==
This fort is believed to be ancient and nearly 3000 years old. This fort is in ruins. Two big caves on the top host a shrine of Lord Bhairavnath and a hostel. The idol in the cave is carved and painted and in good condition.

Recently the Safety Climbing Initiative (SCI) and DurgPremi Giribhraman Sanstha made a rock climbing route.
