= Anand Teltumbde =

Indian scholar (born 1950)

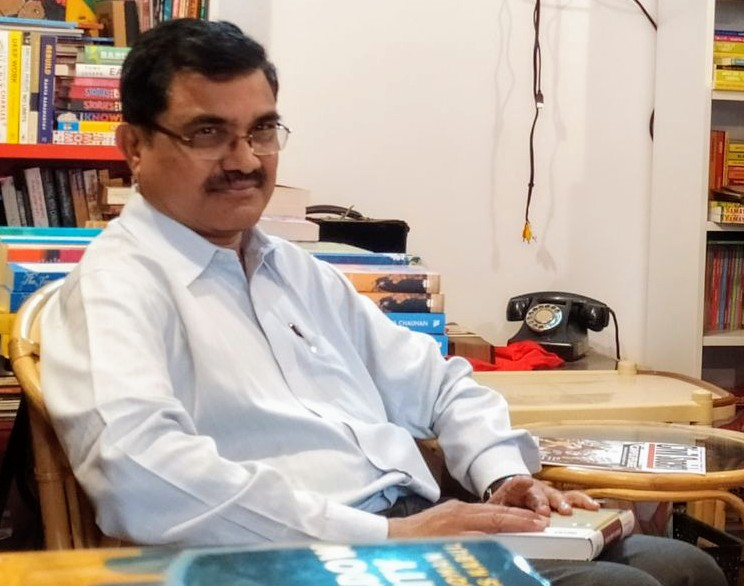
- Anand Teltumbde in 2020
- Born: 15 July 1951 (age 75); Rajur, Bombay State (now Maharashtra), India
- Education: Visvesvaraya National Institute of Technology (B.Tech.) Indian Institute of Management Ahmedabad (MBA) University of Mumbai (PhD)
- Occupations: Professor, writer
- Spouse: Rama Ambedkar
- Relatives: Milind Teltumbde (brother)

Anand Teltumbde (born 15 July 1951) is an Indian scholar, writer, and human rights activist who is a management professor at the Goa Institute of Management. He has written extensively about the caste system in India and has advocated for the rights of Dalits.

Teltumbde is a longtime critic of Indian Prime Minister Narendra Modi, and he was arrested a second time in 2020 and imprisoned along with other activists and intellectuals who were critical of the Modi government. His arrest was condemned by other academics and human rights organizations, and legal experts have said that the charges against him appear to be fabricated. He was released on bail in 2022.

Teltumbde was awarded the Basava Puraskara in 2024.

== Biography ==
Teltumbde was born on 15 July 1951 in Rajur, a village in the Yavatmal district of present-day Maharashtra state, to a family of Dalit farm labourers. He is the oldest among eight siblings. He is married to Rama Teltumbde who is a granddaughter of B. R. Ambedkar. He earned a mechanical engineering degree from Visvesvaraya National Institute of Technology in 1973, an MBA from the Indian Institute of Management Ahmedabad in 1982 and a PhD from the University of Mumbai in cybernetic modelling in 1993 while working as an executive at Bharat Petroleum. He was also awarded an honorary doctorate (D.Litt.) from the Karnataka State Open University.

Teltumbde was an Executive Director at Bharat Petroleum and managing director of Petronet India Limited before becoming an academic. He was a professor at the Indian Institute of Technology Kharagpur and later became a senior professor at the Goa Institute of Management. He contributes a column titled "Margin Speak" to Economic and Political Weekly, and has also contributed to Outlook, Tehelka, and Seminar. His 2018 book, Republic of Caste, is a collection of essays that assesses the position of Dalits in India, including the relationship between caste and class. Teltumbde advocates for a closer relationship between Marxism and the Ambedkarite movements in fighting for Dalit liberation, as well as reform of the reservation system in India.

In January 2024, Teltumbde was awarded the Basava Puraskara by the Government of Karnataka.

=== Imprisonment and international reactions ===
On 29 August 2018, the police raided Teltumbde's home, accusing him of having a connection to the 2018 Bhima Koregaon violence and an alleged Maoist plot to assassinate Prime Minister Narendra Modi. Teltumbde denied the allegations and was granted temporary protection from arrest, but he was nevertheless arrested by the Pune police on 3 February 2019 and released later that day. After his release, Teltumbde accused the government of harassment and of attempting to criminalize dissent. In the course of the investigation, various others have been critical of the handling of the case, including Supreme Court Justice D. Y. Chandrachud who questioned the biased nature of the investigation by the Maharashtra Police, when hearing a plea on the same.

The Washington Post reported that Teltumbde was arrested as part of "a government crackdown on lawyers and activists" who are critics of Modi. Legal experts have said the charges against Teltumbde appear fabricated. More than 600 scholars and academics issued a joint statement in support of Teltumbde, condemning the government's actions as a "witch-hunt" and demanding an immediate halt to the actions against Teltumbde. In addition, over 150 organizations and intellectuals—including Noam Chomsky and Cornel West—signed a letter to United Nations secretary general António Guterres, describing the charges as "fabricated" and calling for the UN to intervene.

Teltumbde's mobile phone was hacked by Israeli spyware Pegasus through WhatsApp along with over a dozen other activists, lawyers, and journalists in India. Teltumbde had noticed his phone had been "acting up" and was later contacted by Citizen Lab in October 2019.

On 16 March 2020, the Supreme Court of India dismissed Teltumbde's plea for anticipatory bail under the Unlawful Activities (Prevention) Act (UAPA), which makes bail difficult to obtain for accused individuals. The Court gave Teltumbde and Navlakha three weeks to surrender. On 8 April, a bench headed by Justice Arun Mishra ordered Teltumbde to surrender to the National Investigation Agency on 14 April. Historians such as Romila Thapar and organizations including Human Rights Watch condemned the arrest while Amnesty International India expressed disappointment in light of the UNHCHR guidelines to release all political prisoners due to the COVID-19 pandemic in India. Teltumbde was denied bail again in July 2021. While imprisoned, he was allowed a weekly two-minute phone call with his wife.

In November 2022, Teltumbde was released from Taloja Central Prison after the Bombay High Court granted him bail and the order was upheld by the Supreme Court. The court found no prima facie evidence that Teltumbde had been involved in a terrorist act under the UAPA.

== Selected publications ==
- The Radical in Ambedkar (ed.) (Penguin Random House, New Delhi, 2018) ISBN 978-0670091157
- Republic of Caste: Thinking of Equality in the Era of Neoliberalism and Hindutva (Navayana, New Delhi, 2018) ISBN 978-8189059842
- Dalits: Past, Present and Future (Routledge, London and New York, 2016) ISBN 978-1138688759
- Mahad: The Making of the First Dalit Revolt (Aakar, New Delhi, 2015) ISBN 978-9350023983
- The Persistence of Caste (Zed Books, London, 2010) ISBN 9781848134492
- Khairlanji: A Strange and Bitter Crop (Navayana, Delhi, 2008) ISBN 978-8189059156
- Annihilation of Caste (Ramai, Mumbai, 2005) ISBN 978-9353040772
- Hindutva and Dalits: Perspectives for Understanding Communal Praxis (ed.) (Samya, Kolkata, 2005) ISBN 978-8185604756
- 'Ambedkar' in and for the Post-Ambedkar Dalit Movement (Sugawa, Pune, 1997) ISBN 978-8186182291
