= Raghoji Bhangare =

Indian revolutionary (1805–1848)

Naik Raghojirao Ramjirao Bhangre Patil of Devgaon
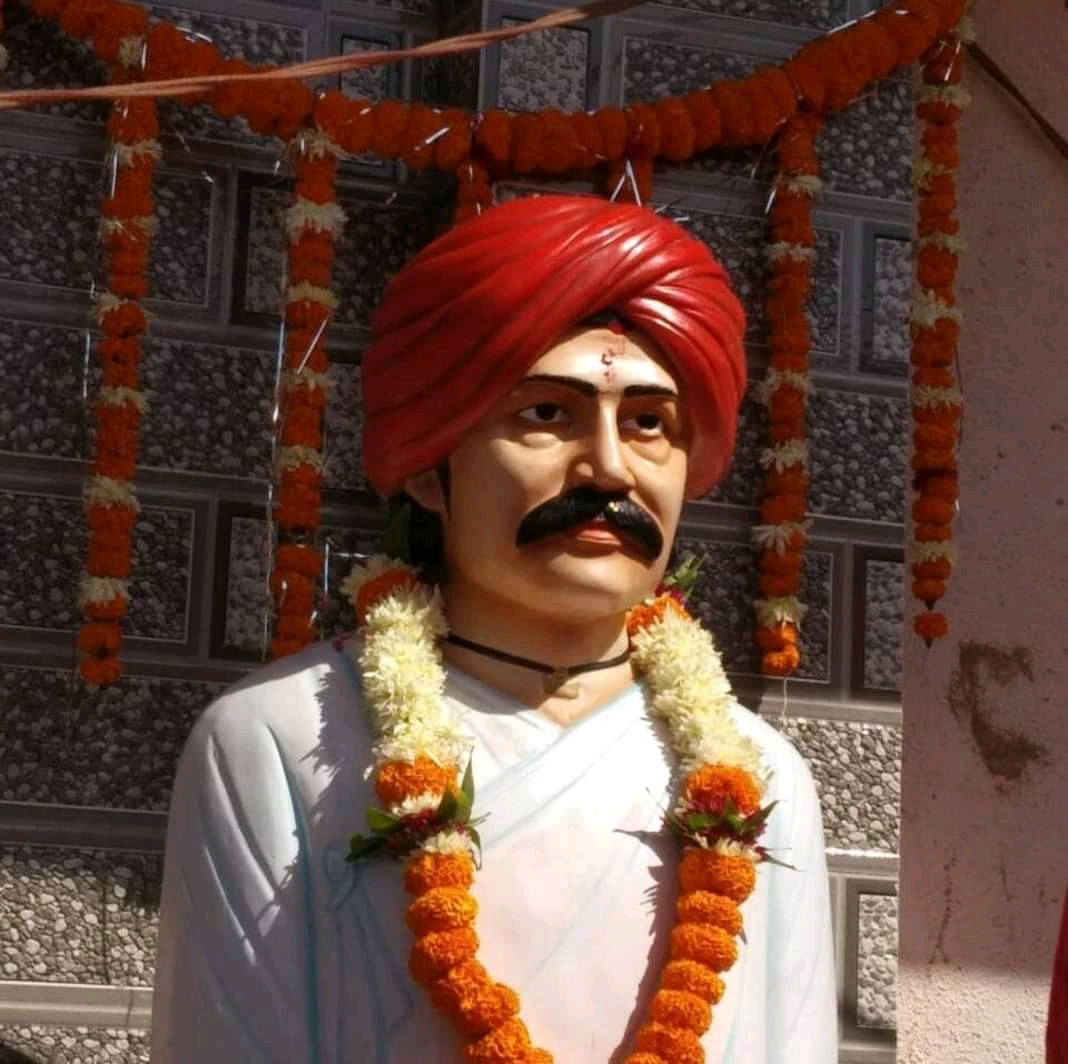
- Born: Raghoji; 8 November 1805; Devgaon, Akole, India
- Died: 2 May 1848 (aged 42)
- Cause of death: Hanged
- Burial place: Umbhrai
- Other names: Raghuji, Raghojee
- Occupation: Patil of Devgaon
- Era: British era
- Organization: Bandkari
- Title: Indian Freedom Activist; Patil of Devgaon; Chief of Kolis of Bhangre clan
- Predecessor: Ramjirao Manajirao Bhangre
- Movement: Indian independence movement
- Family: Bapuji Bhangare (brother)

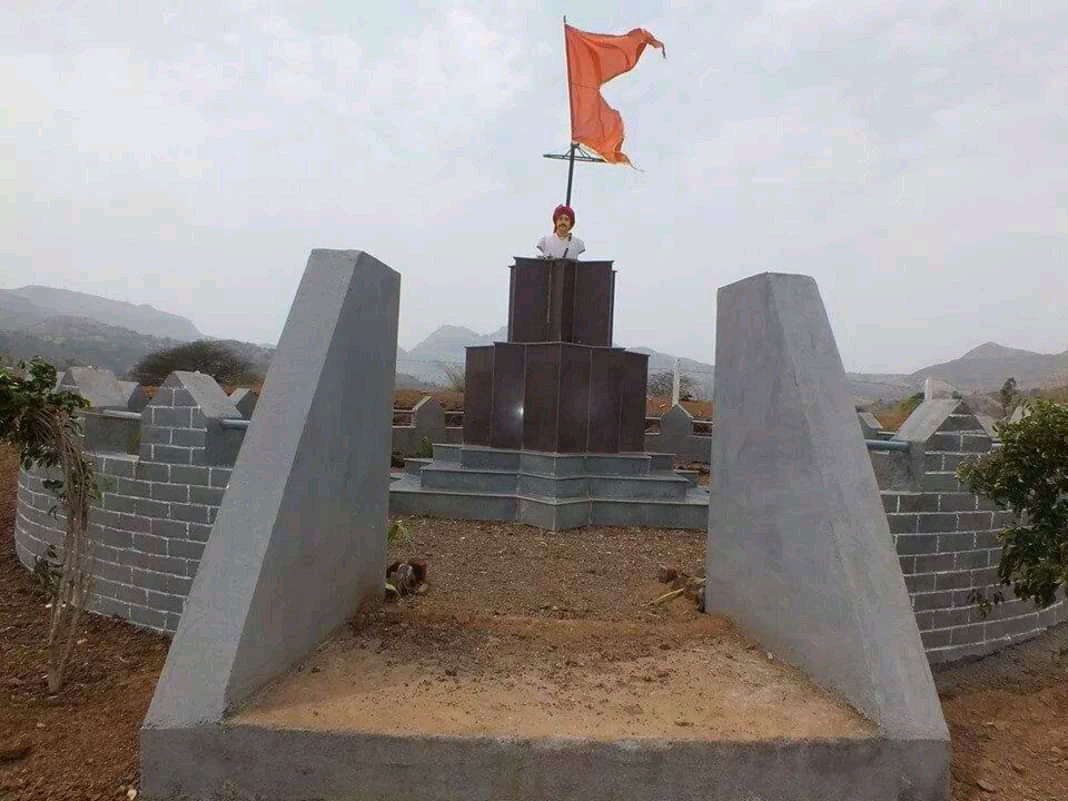
Raghoji Rao Bhangre statue in Ahmadnagar

Raghojirao Ramjirao Bhangre also spell Bhangaria (8 November 1805 – 2 May 1848) was an Indian revolutionary who challenged and defied the British power in Maharashtra. He was the son of Ramji Bhangre, a Koli who also resisted the British rule and was subsequently hanged in Cellular Jail. he was only ten years old when he took up arms against British rule in Maharashtra.

== Death ==
On 2 May 1848, Bangre was caught by Lieutenant-General Gell and hanged.

== Tribute ==
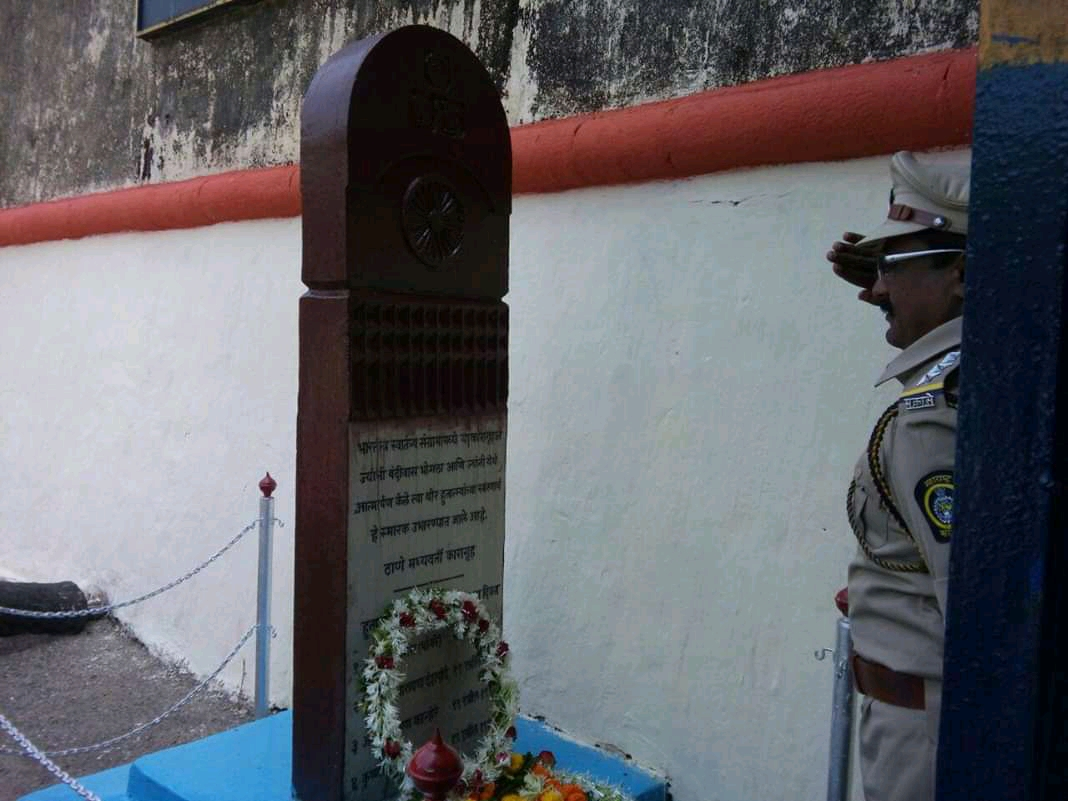
Raghoji Bhangre Jayanti celebration by maharashtra police 2007

In 2014, The Chief minister of Maharashtra, Prithviraj Chavan inaugurated a Circuit House in Thane named after Raghoji.

== See also ==
- List of Koli people
- List of Koli states and clans
