= Khemirao Sarnaik =

Hindu rebel leader against Mughal Empire

Khemiraoji Sarnaik
- Born: Khemirao; 1605
- Died: 1650 (aged 44–45); Mughal Empire
- Era: Mughal Maratha era
- Known for: Hindu rebellion against Jaziya
- Title: Sarnaik of Koli Naiks of Bavan Maval

Honoured Monument of Koli rebellion

Khemirao Sarnaik (also known as Kheni Sirnayak) was a Koli Deshmukh of the Maval region in 1640s, rebelled against Mughal governor Aurangzeb and abolished Jizya.

When Shivaji began his revolts in following decades, the kolis were amongst the first to join Shivaji under Khemirao Sarnaik.

According to sociologist Govind Sadasiva Ghurye, the main reason for the rebellion was the imposition of land tax (Jaziya) by Sultan Aurangzeb. The Koli Zamidars had taken up arms against the Sultan Aurangzeb under the leadership of Khemirao Sarnaik, as well as with the sympathy of Shivaji as it was a great benefit to Shivaji. Khemrao assembled all the Koli naiks and promised that he would get rid of Mughal rule in a single rise. Aurangzeb sent the Mughal army from the hilly areas to suppress the Koli rebellion, but the battle was very fierce in which thousands of Kolis were killed and the Mughal soldiers also. The Koli rebellion shook Aurangzeb. Sarnaik applied for help from Shivaji but Shivaji was unable to help Kolis because of their political matters and sarnaik was refused. The Khemirao Sarnaik fighting in this battle was killed by Mughal commander Nerrulaa, but the Koli rebellion was so intense that Aurangzeb got compelled to think. after the rebellion was crushed, the Kolis were treated with kindness by Aurangzeb and then Kolis achieved a high reputation under Peshwa for their daring and taking hill forts such as Kanhoji Angre and Tanaji Malusare.

== Cause of rebellion ==
The reason for the Koli revolt was Aurangzeb's imposition of Jiziya (tax on the land of Hindus) on Hindus. After which Sarnaik, fed up with Jiziya, united the people of his caste (Mahadev Koli) and planned a revolt against the Sultan. But a lot of power was required to fight Aurangzeb for which Sarnaik Khemirao went to Shivaji Raje Bhosle as Sarnaik believed that Shivaji would accompany him in the fight against Aurangzeb as the Kolis fought for Shivaji against the Bijapur Sultanate. Anyway, Shivaji was to benefit from the Mahadev Koli rebellion against Aurangzeb. At the same time Sarnaik also sought help from the king of princely state of Jawhar because the king of Jawhar also belonged to the Koli caste, after which Khemirao Sarnaik revolted against Aurangzeb, the Sultan of the Mughal Empire.

== See also ==
- List of Koli people
- List of Koli states and clans
