= Ratangad =

Fort in Ratanwadi, India

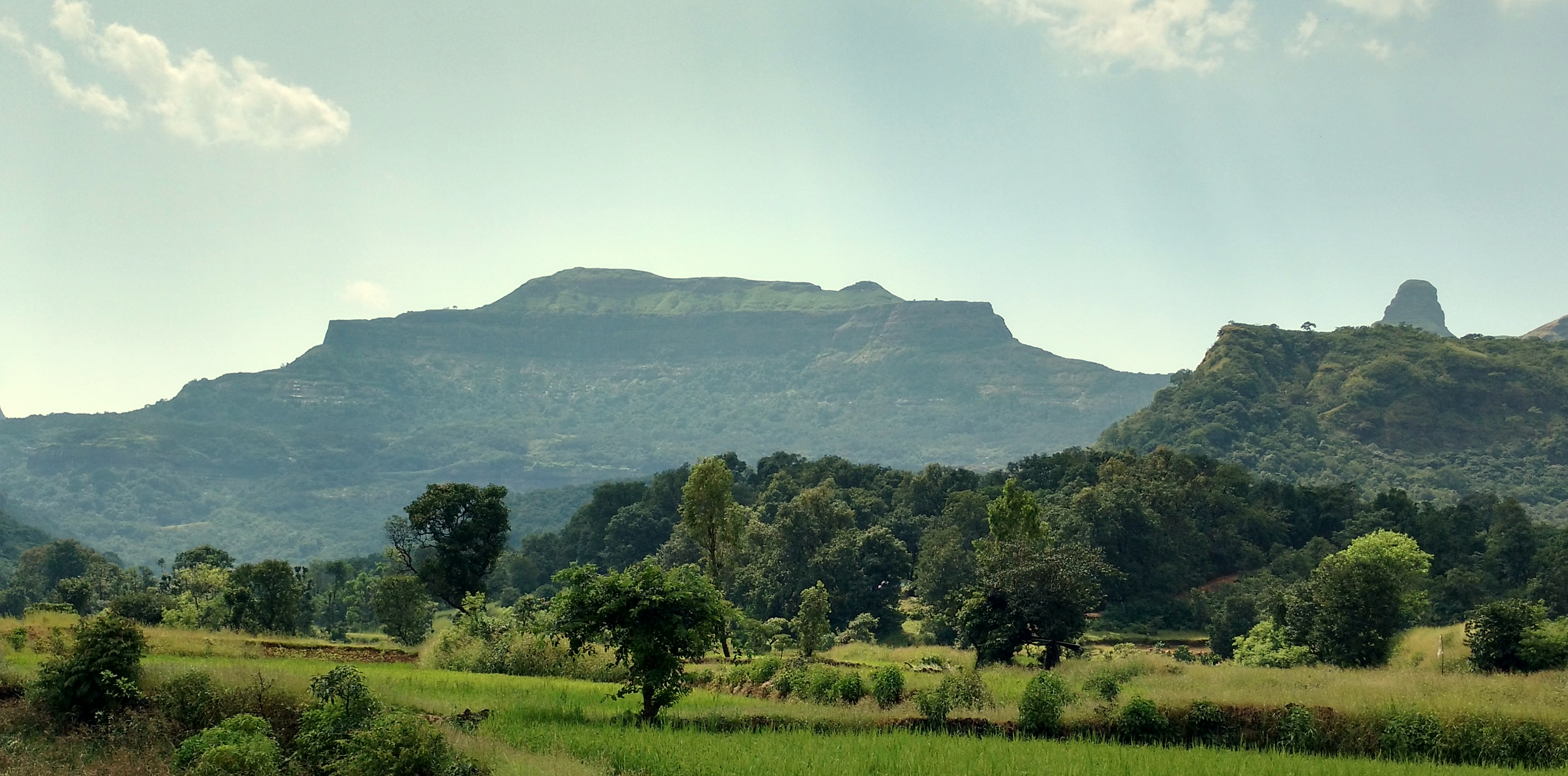
- Ratangad fort seen from Ratanwadi

Highest point
- Elevation: 1,297 m (4,255 ft)
- Coordinates: 19°30′N 73°41′E

Naming
- Language of name: Marathi

Geography
- Location within Maharashtra
- Location: Ratanwadi, Taluka Akole, Ahmednagar District, Maharashtra, India
- Parent range: Western Ghats

Geology
- Mountain type: Hill Fort

Ratangad is a fort in Ratanwadi, Maharashtra, India, overlooking Bhandardara in the Ahmadnagar district of Maharashtra bordering the Thane district. The fort is about 400 years old. Ratangad is also called Jewel of the Sahyadris.

It has a natural rock peak with a cavity in it at the top which is called 'Nedhe' or 'Eye of the Needle'. The fort has four gates: Ganesh, Hanuman, Konkan and Trimbak. Sculptures of Ganesh and Hanuman are on the main gate.

== See also ==
- Govind Rao Khare
