= Devgaon =

Village in Maharashtra

- village
- Location in Maharashtra, India Devgaon (India)
- Coordinates: 19.5603269°N 73.1393861°E
- Country: India
- State: Maharashtra
- District: Palghar
- Taluka: Dahanu
- Elevation: 63 m (207 ft)

Population (2011)
  - Total: 1,547
- Time zone: UTC+5:30 (IST)
- ISO 3166 code: IN-MH
- 2011 census code: 551671

Devgaon is a village in the Palghar district of Maharashtra, India. It is located in the Dahanu taluka.

== Demographics ==
According to the 2011 census of India, Devgaon has 285 households. The effective literacy rate (i.e. the literacy rate of population excluding children aged 6 and below) is 32.96%.

Demographics (2011 Census)
	Total	Male	Female
Population	1547	743	804
Children aged below 6 years	294	133	161
Scheduled caste	0	0	0
Scheduled tribe	1526	731	795
Literates	413	249	164
Workers (all)	581	383	198
Main workers (total)	548	369	179
Main workers: Cultivators	83	46	37
Main workers: Agricultural labourers	219	141	78
Main workers: Household industry workers	21	9	12
Main workers: Other	225	173	52
Marginal workers (total)	33	14	19
Marginal workers: Cultivators	13	5	8
Marginal workers: Agricultural labourers	18	8	10
Marginal workers: Household industry workers	0	0	0
Marginal workers: Others	2	1	1
Non-workers	966	360	606

== Notable ==
- Ramji Bhangare, freedom activist
- Valoji Bhangare
