= Kanua Baba =

Koli saint in Uttar Pradesh

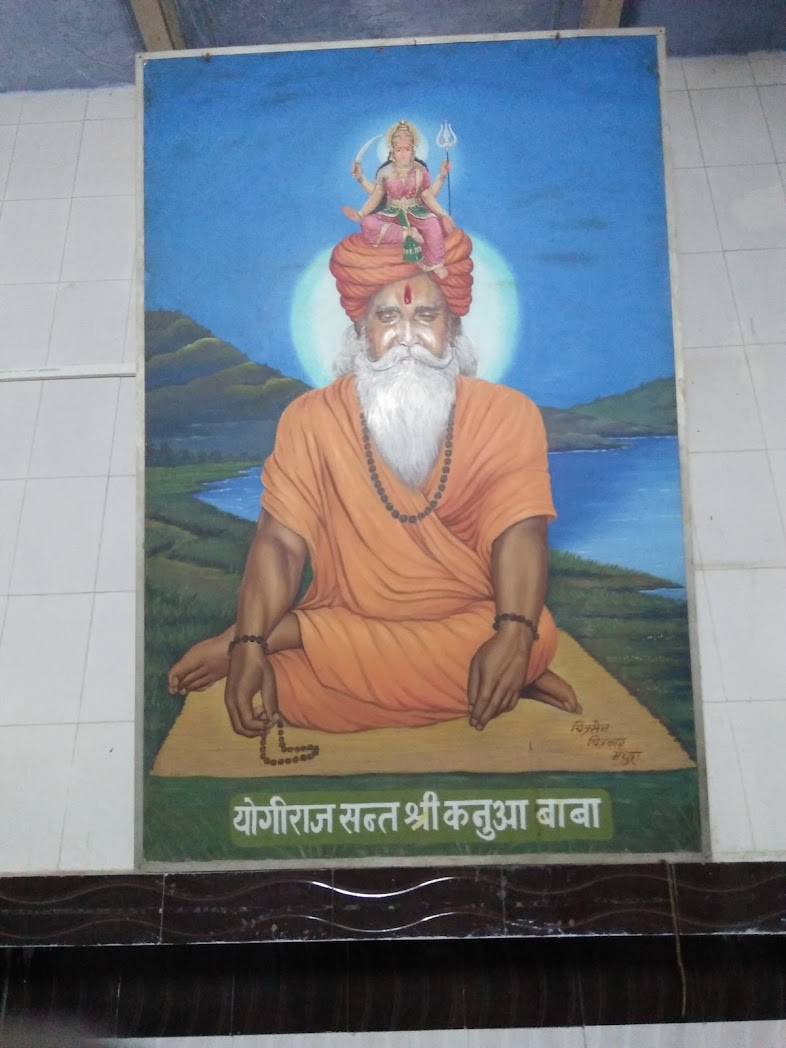
- Depiction of Kanua Baba in Mathura temple

Yogiraj
- Born: Mathura, Uttar Pradesh, India
- Died: Mathura, Uttar Pradesh, India
- Major shrine: Potra Kund, Krishna Janam Bhumi, Mathura, Uttar Pradesh, India

Kanua Baba was a saint in Uttar Pradesh, India. Every year the birthday anniversary of Kanua is celebrated by his followers.

Kanua Bawa is respected by certain Indian Muslims and followed by Hindu communities, and he built a masjid and a temple of Bhairon bawa.

== Legacy ==
- In Goverdhan city of Mathura district, a road is named as Kanua Baba Tiraha.
