= Rajur =

- Census town
- Interactive map of Rajur
- Coordinates: 20°03′17″N 78°57′24″E
- Country: India
- State: Maharashtra
- District: Yavatmal
- Elevation: 741 m (2,431 ft)

Population (2001)
  - Total: 11,677

Languages
  - Official: Marathi
- Time zone: UTC+5:30 (IST)
- Website: https://akolemaza.com/

Rajur is a census town in Yavatmal district in the Indian state of Maharashtra. Rajur is also known as Rajur Colliery.

== Geography ==
Rajur has an average elevation of 741 metres (2431 feet).

== Demographics ==
As of 2001 India census, Rajur had a population of 11,677. Males constitute 52% of the population and females 48%. Rajur has an average literacy rate of 70%, higher than the national average of 59.5%: male literacy is 78%, and female literacy is 62%. In Rajur, 13% of the population is under 6 years of age.

Year	Male	Female	Total Population	Change	Religion (%)							
Year	Male	Female	Total Population	Change	Hindu	Muslim	Christian	Sikhs	Buddhist	Jain	Other religions and persuasions	Religion not stated
2001	6019	5656	11675	-	64.463	11.520	2.116	0.197	19.837	0.120	1.722	0.026
2011	5639	5053	10692	8.4̥%	62.608	14.656	2.226	0.187	19.220	0.159	0.037	0.907

== Notable people ==
- Anand Teltumbde, civil rights activist, scholar and columnist.
- Milind Teltumbde, Maoist politician.
