= Maval =

- city
- Location in Maharashtra, India
- Coordinates: 18.756487°N 73.456206°E
- Country: India
- State: Maharashtra
- District: Pune

Government
  - MP: Shrirang Barne (Shiv Sena)
  - MLA: Sunil Shelke (NCP)

Languages
  - Official: Marathi
- Time zone: UTC+5:30 (IST)
- Vehicle registration: MH-14
- Coastline: 0 kilometres (0 mi)

Maval (also known as Andhar Maval) is a tehsil in a subdivision of the same name, in the Pune district of Maharashtra, India.

== Description ==
The word Maval is derived from a Marathi word Maval, meaning the direction in which the sun sets. This region is towards the west of Pune area. It is hilly terrain and part of the Sahyadri range/western ghats. The Sahyadri range goes from north to south. On the western part of the range lies the Konkan area and on the eastern side 'Maval'. Many rivers originate from this region and travel from west to east. Broadly speaking, Maval is subdivided into 12 subregions. Each subregion is mostly identified by the name of a river. The names of the subregions are Andar Maval, Kanad Maval (Kanad Khore), Korbarse Maval, Gunjan Maval, Nane Maval, Pavan Maval, Paud Maval (Paud Khore), Mutha Khore, Muse Khore (or Mose Khore), Rohid Khore, Velvand Khore, Hirdas Maval etc. The highest point of this region is the Mahabaleshwar area, which is approximately 4500 feet above sea level. Maval is one of the world's highly biodiversified regions.

It was the first abode of Shivaji, who formed an army of the local inhabitants called 'Mavale'.

== Notable people ==
- Shivrampant Damle (1900–1977), Indian educationist

== See also ==
- Mavala
