= Patil (title) =

Indian honorific title

The Patil (Hindi: पाटील) (meaning "village headman") is an Indian last name and a title or surname. The female variant of the title is Patlin or Patlinbai, and is also used to describe the wife of a Patil.

Patil is the Marathi apabhramsha of the word "Pattakil" (पट्टकिल). During the Shilahara period, "pattakil" was the designation of the officer responsible for tax collection and local administration. Historically, a Patil was the head of a village working under a Deshmukh who was head of the district. Under Deccan sultanates, and the Maratha Empire, the Patil was the village headman and the most important Vatandar of the village. His main duties were to be the collector of revenue, as well as being the head of police and justice.

In Konkan, a Patil was called "Khot". Historian Ness writes that "what the Patil and Kulkarni were to a village, the Deshmukh or Deshpande were to the district, or Pargana".

Patil settled villages and collected revenues from the villagers, thus a Patil family typically owned 80-90 percent of village land. Colonising multiple villages promoted a Patil to a Deshmukh. The Patil was entitled to several free services from village peasants and artisans. The Patil presided over all village festivals, such as Dasara, Diwali and Holi. Patil watan was held by Maratha, Dhangar-Hatkar, Lingayat, Brahmin, Jain and Muslim communities of Maharashtra and Karnataka. This watan was either purchased or granted by the king.

The ancestors of some of the important personalities of the Maratha empire held hereditary Patilki rights for villages in Maharashtra. Shivaji's family had Patilki rights at Verul. Shivaji grandfather, Maloji bought Patilki rights to additional villages in present day Pune district. The ancestors of Shinde rulers of Gwalior held similar rights in the village of Kanherkhed in Satara district. Similarly Sardar Vithal Sadashiv Vinchurkar (Dani) held Patilki of Vinchur village in Chandwad pargana.

The majority of Patils were illiterate, with exception of Deshastha Brahmin families such as the Vinchurkars (Dani), Purandares, Sambranis and Tulshibagwales. Hence the correspondence would be carried in the name of Patil and Kulkarni and they would jointly sign all government documents. The Patil would typically put his thumbprint or other marks on the document. The Kulkarni would sometimes take advantage of the illiteracy of the Patil and "use him as a tool". Shahu Maharaj of Kolhapur, a social reformer, decided to end the dependency of the Patil on the Kulkarni. On 15 May 1912, he started a school called the "Patil School" to train future Patils in their duties as village officers. This school was in operation for seven years. The Gokhale Institute of Politics and Economics commented that in 1955, it was made mandatory for the Police Patil to be educated up to at least the 4th grade although he was not usually a literate person before.

== See also ==
Patil (surname)
