= Mavala =

Koli title

Mavala (plural Mavale in Marathi) was a name used for people of the hilly Maval region west of the present day Indian city of Pune. It was in Maval that the 17th century Maratha leader, Shivaji, first established his power base that later developed into the Maratha Empire. The inhabitants of this hilly region who were heavily enlisted in his guerrilla forces and raiding bands were known as Mavale, these soldiers were expert footmen and excelled in mountain warfare. The infantry was considered the backbone of Shivaji's power, and according to Sabhasad Bakhar, which chronicled Shivaji's life, the Mavale Hasham infantry of Shivaji was composed of 100,000 men.

Mavale were mostly composed of Kunbi castes. Some of the inhabitants of the region in north were Kolis while the south was mainly inhabited by Marathas.

The region was also known as Bavan Maval (52 Khora or valleys) covering the present-day districts of Pune and Ahmednagar. Each Khora was under the rule of a Maratha nayaks, deshmukh, sarnaik or sardar.

Each Maval lord commanded armed forces enlisted majorly from among his own tenants for the purpose of territorial defense and law enforcement. Additionally, they were appealed by their suzerain to raise troops for royal service in times of need, and would duly receive additional bounties and grants of new territories in reward.

== See also ==
- Khemirao Sarnaik
