= List of Koli states and clans =

Many parts of Western and Northern regions of the Indian subcontinent were ruled as sovereign or princely states by various clans of Kolis.

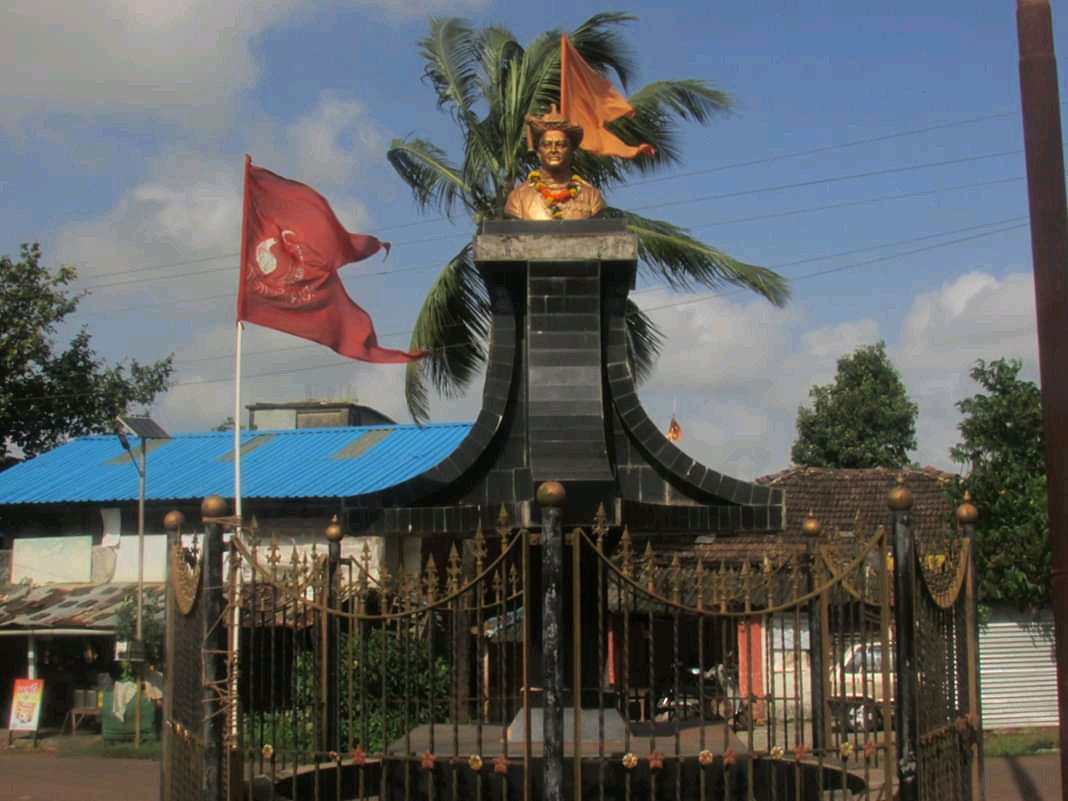
Statue of Koli Maharaja Yashwantrao Martandrao Mukne of Jawhar State

== Principalities and clans ==
- Koli of Saurashtra
- Kolis of Dadra and Nagar Haveli
- Mukne Dynasty of Jawhar State
- Bhangare of Devgaon
- Shah of Ramnagar Kingdom
- Raja of Peint
- Pawar Dynasty of Surgana State
- Thorat of Daman and Diu
- Patil of Janjira
- Nayak of Sinhagad
- Kagadia of Umrala

== See also ==
- List of Koli people
