= Mahalakshmi Temple =

Mahalakshmi Temple or Mahalaxmi Temple may refer to these Hindu temples in Maharashtra, India dedicated to the goddess Mahalakshmi:

- Mahalakshmi Temple, Kolhapur considered a Shakti Peeth
- Mahalakshmi Temple, Mumbai, a prominent Mumbai landmark
- Mahalakshmi Temple, Dahanu, a temple at Dahanu
- Mahalakshmi Temple, Hedavde, Vasai Virar

== See also ==
- Mahalakshmi (disambiguation)
- Goravanahalli Mahalakshmi Temple, Goravanahalli, Tumkur district, Karnataka, India
