= Mahalakshmi (disambiguation) =

Mahalakshmi or Mahalaxmi (the almighty Lakshmi) may refer to Lakshmi, the Hindu goddess of wealth, fortune, fertility and prosperity; or to the fierce form of the goddess Lakshmi which she took while protecting the world.

== Places ==
- Mahalaxmi, Mumbai, a neighbourhood region in Mumbai, Maharashtra, India
  - Mahalaxmi railway station, a suburban railway station serving the neighbourhood
  - Mahalaxmi Racecourse, a horse racing track in the neighbourhood
  - Mahalaxmi Dhobi Ghat, a large open-air laundry in the neighbourhood
- Mahalaxmi, Indore, a suburb of Indore, Madhya Pradesh, India
- Mahalakshmi Layout, a suburb in north-western Bangalore, Karnataka, India
  - Mahalakshmi Layout Assembly constituency
  - Mahalakshmi metro station, a metro station serving the suburb
- Mahalaxmi, Lalitapur, a municipality in Lalitpur District, Nepal
- Mahalaxmi, Dhankuta, a municipality in Dhankuta District, Nepal

== Temples dedicated to Mahalakshmi ==
- Mahalakshmi Temple (disambiguation)
  - Mahalakshmi Temple, Dahanu, Maharashtra, India
  - Mahalakshmi Temple, Kolhapur, Kolhapur, Maharashtra, India
  - Mahalakshmi Temple, Mumbai, Mumbai, Maharashtra, India
  - Mahalakshmi Temple, Hedavde, Vasai Virar, Maharashtra, India
  - Goravanahalli Mahalakshmi Temple, Goravanahalli, Tumkur district, Karnataka, India

== Others ==
- Mahalakshmi (Kannada actress), Indian actress in Kannada cinema
- Mahalakshmi (Malayalam actress), Indian actress in Malayalam cinema
- Mahalakshmi (film), a 2001 Indian film
- Mahalakshmi (TV series), a Tamil soap opera
- Mahalaxmi Iyer, an Indian playback singer
- Mahalaxmi Express, an express train belonging to Indian Railways that runs between Mumbai and Kolhapur
- Mahalakshmi Vrata, a Hindu ceremony
