= Som Shah of Ramnagar =

Koli Maharaja of Ramnagar Kingdom

The Maharaja Soma Shah was Koli ruler of the petty kingdom of Ramnagar, present days in Gujarat. He invented the Chauth system which was a form of the Protection fees.

== Chauth system ==
It was started by Maharaja of Ramnagar when Portuguese possessed Daman and Diu and was an annual tax nominally levied at 25% on revenue or produce, hence the name. It was levied on the lands which were under nominal Portuguese rule by Maharaja Som Shah. Chauth was a fee for Portuguese to purchase the protection from Maharaja of Ramnagar so Maharaja Som Shah was called as 'Chauthia Raja' which means Guardian King. The Portuguese chief 'Fernao De Miranda' paid the 1/4 share of the total revenue of Daman and Diu.

== Disputes and Politics on Chauth ==
The British Indian historian Jadunath Sarkar states that there were several disputes between petty kingdom of Jawhar and the kingdom of Ramnagar in 1670 after the treaty between Raja Vikram Shah Mukne (Vikramrao) of Jawhar and Portuguese Captain Fernao De Miranda of Daman and Diu. Miranda entered into an agreement with Vikramshah to destroy the Ramnagar and he would pay to him the chauth. Thereafter, the Raja Vikramshah attacked at Ramnagar and destroyed many villages and infested the ramnagar territory and claimed the Chauth from Portuguese. Till now chauth was charged by ramnagar's ruler so there was a big problem for Portuguese they again forced the vikramshah to defeat the ramnagar ruler but maybe there was a political views because both of the petty kingdoms of Ramnagar and Jawhar's rulers belong to same tribe of the same community so they both claimed the chauth from Portuguese.

== Fall of Ramnagar and annexation in Maratha Empire ==
Jadunath Sarkar wrote that, after the failure of the treaty with Jawhar State, Portuguese Captain Fernao De Miranda went to the Maratha Emperor 'Chhatrapati Shivaji' of Maratha Empire and persuaded him to destroy the Koli countries of Jawhar and Ramnagar and to get ride of protection fees. Jadunath Sarkar stated that there also was a political problem for Chhatrapati Shivaji to attack the Jawhar and Ramnagar. Some of the important Subedars, Commanders and military soldiers were from same community as the rulers of Jawhar and Ramnagar. So Chhatrapati Shivaji collected the information but did not attack the Koli countries, instead claiming the Chauth from Portuguese.

After that Captain Fernao De Miranda paid Chauth to the Maharaja Som Shah, Vikram Shah and Chhatrapati Shivaji. After a few instalments of Chauth, the Captain did not pay for Chhatrapati Shivaji. When asked to pay, he retorted that Chhatrapati Shivaji had not defeated any of the rulers and so was not a master to be paid. After this, in 1671,Chhatrapati Shivaji sent his prime minister Peshwa Moropant Trimbak Pingle against both rulers. Peshwa commanded the Imperial Maratha Army and defeated the Vikram Shah and then marched against Maharaja Som Shah and captured some of the territory. Thereafter, Chhatrapati Shivaji claimed the Chauth. After some time, the Portuguese did not pay because Chhatrapati Shivaji had not conquered the entirety of Empire of Maharaja Som Shah. In 1672, there was a battle for one week. During the battle, Mughal general Dilir Khan and an ally of Som Shah prepared his army. On the hearing of the Mughal army, Peshwa Moropant returned to Konkan. It is mentioned that Kolis of Ramnagar captured the Marathas at Gambhirgad Fort but Peshwa again with more power attacked at Ramnagar and captured it. After the defeat of Maharaja Som Shah, Ramnagar kingdom was annexed in the Maratha Empire on 19 June 1672.

== See also ==
- List of Koli people
- List of Koli states and clans
