= Mahalakshmi Temple, Dahanu =

Mahalakshmi Temple
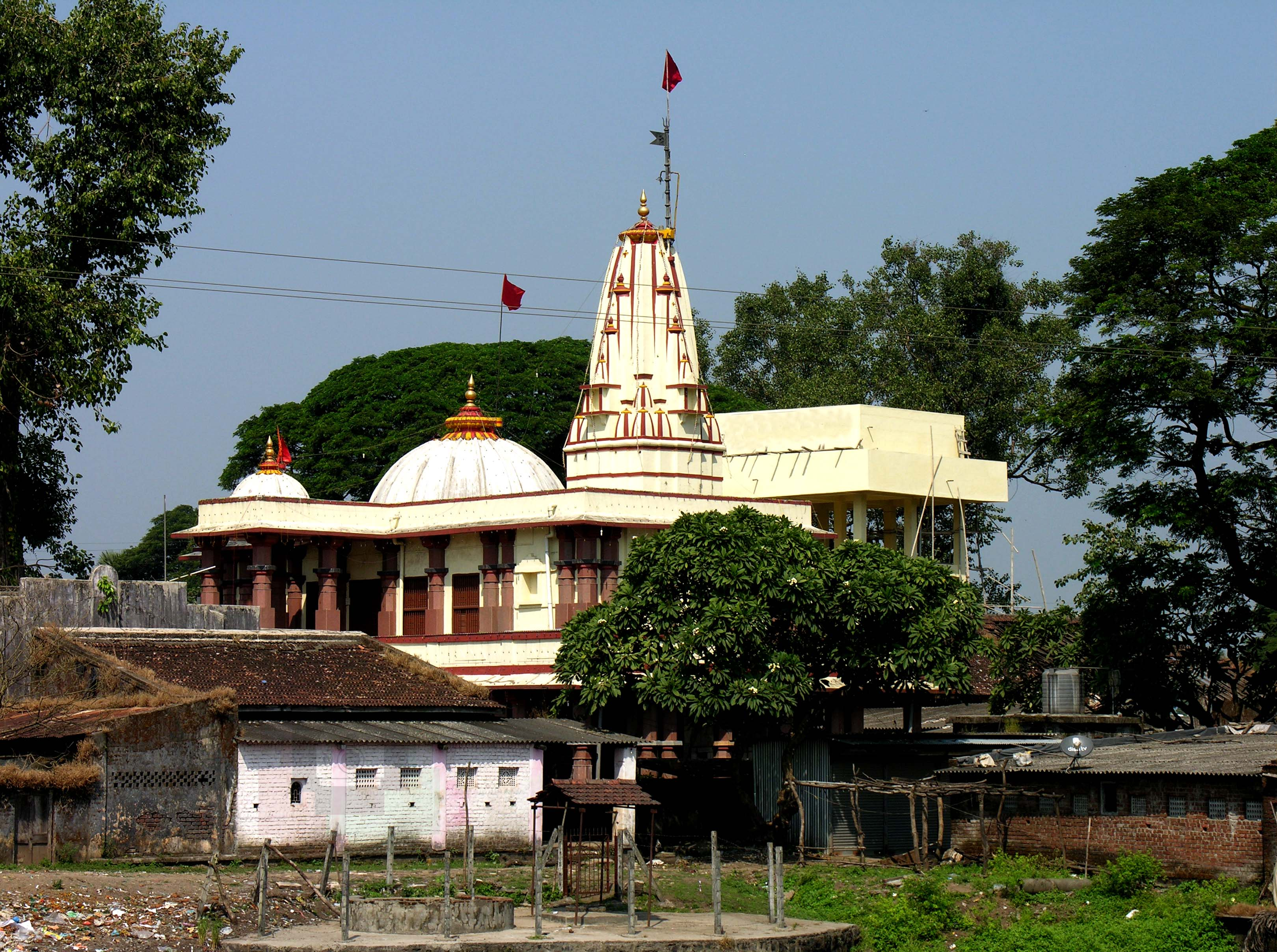
- Mahalakshmi Temple

Religion
- Affiliation: Hinduism
- District: Palghar
- Deity: Goddess Lakshmi

Location
- Location: Dahanu
- State: Maharashtra
- Country: India
- Interactive map of Mahalakshmi Temple
- Coordinates: 19°56′27″N 72°56′04″E

Architecture
- Type: Hindu architecture
- Completed: 1306

The Mahalakshmi temple, or Mahalaxmi Temple, is a temple situated on the Mumbai–Ahmedabad Highway in Dahanu taluka, Palghar, Maharashtra, India. It is dedicated to Mahalakshmi. This temple was built by Koli king Jayaba Mukne of Jawhar State in 1306 at the establishment of Jawhar. During the worship, the flag of the present Raja of Mukne Dynasty of Jawhar is offered to the mother's temple. The flag is presented by Narayan Satava, the priest of the village of Vaghadi.

The responsibility for managing the temple and conducting its rituals was traditionally entrusted to the Satav clan of the Malhar Koli community by the Koli rulers of Jawhar. The present high priest also belongs to this clan. Within Malhar Koli tradition, Mahalakshmi is regarded as the clan goddess (kuladevi) of the Satavs; who are associated with the mountains. Members of the Satav clan are therefore accorded particular respect, both among other Malhar Koli groups and in neighboring tribal communities.

== Legend ==
According to local tradition, the goddess Mahalakshmi is believed to have manifested in Dahanu to protect the coastal and agrarian communities of the region. Oral accounts maintain that the deity originally resided on a hill at Vivalvedhe, known as Mahalakshmi Gad. During an annual pilgrimage, a devotee is said to have struggled while climbing the steep hill to have her darśana (sight of the goddess). Moved by compassion, the goddess is believed to have descended and taken residence at the base of the hill, where her shrine stands today.

Another popular belief links the Dahanu shrine with the larger Mahalakshmi traditions of Maharashtra. Some versions connect her with the Kolhapur Mahalakshmi, stating that after blessing the Karveer region, the goddess journeyed northwards and chose Dahanu as one of her abodes.

In the local traditions, Mahalakshmi is venerated as a jāgr̥ta daivat (a “living” or “awakened” deity), believed to actively protect her devotees and ensure prosperity of the land. The temple’s annual yātrā (fair), held for fifteen days beginning on Hanuman Jayanti, reflects her enduring importance in the cultural and ritual life of Dahanu and the surrounding tribal and agrarian communities.

== Navratri Festival ==
During Navaratri celebrations, devotees from distant places throng to the temple, which is decorated for this occasion, to pay obeisance. They have to stand for hours in long queues holding coconuts, flowers and sweets which they offer to the goddess.
