= Economy of the Maratha Empire =

The economy of the Maratha Empire was predominantly agriculture based and was sustained through a combination of land revenue, military tribute, extraction and a decentralized fiscal administration. It drew inspirations from earlier Deccan and Mughal Empires. The Marathas developed distinctive mechanisms such as Chauth and sardeshmukhi, which became central to their political expansion.

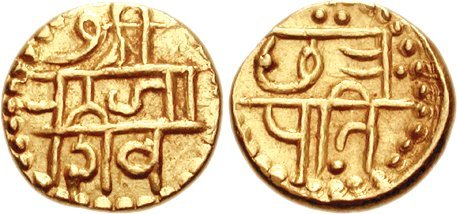
Gold coins minted during Shivaji's era, 17th century.

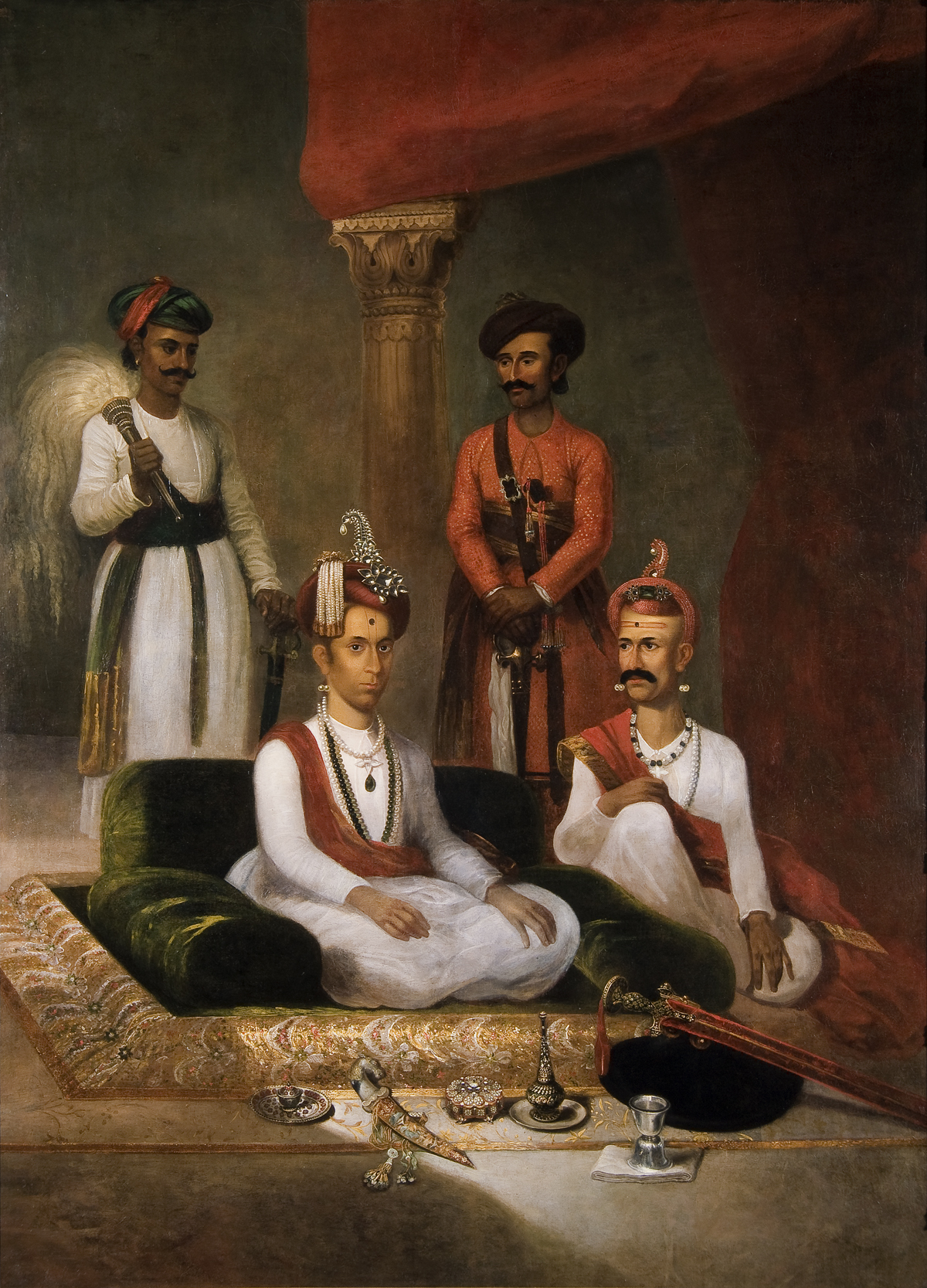
The Maratha Peshwa Madhav Rao Narayan with Nana Fadnavis.

The Marathas largely derived their taxation system from the Mughal tax administration system which was left largely intact with somewhat change with Tapan Raychaudhuri estimating revenue assessment actually increased to 50 percent or more, in contrast to China's 5 to 6 percent, to cover the cost of the wars.

== Agriculture ==
Agriculture formed the major basis of the Maratha economy. The economic revenue income was largely derived from land revenue collected from cultivators and zamindars.

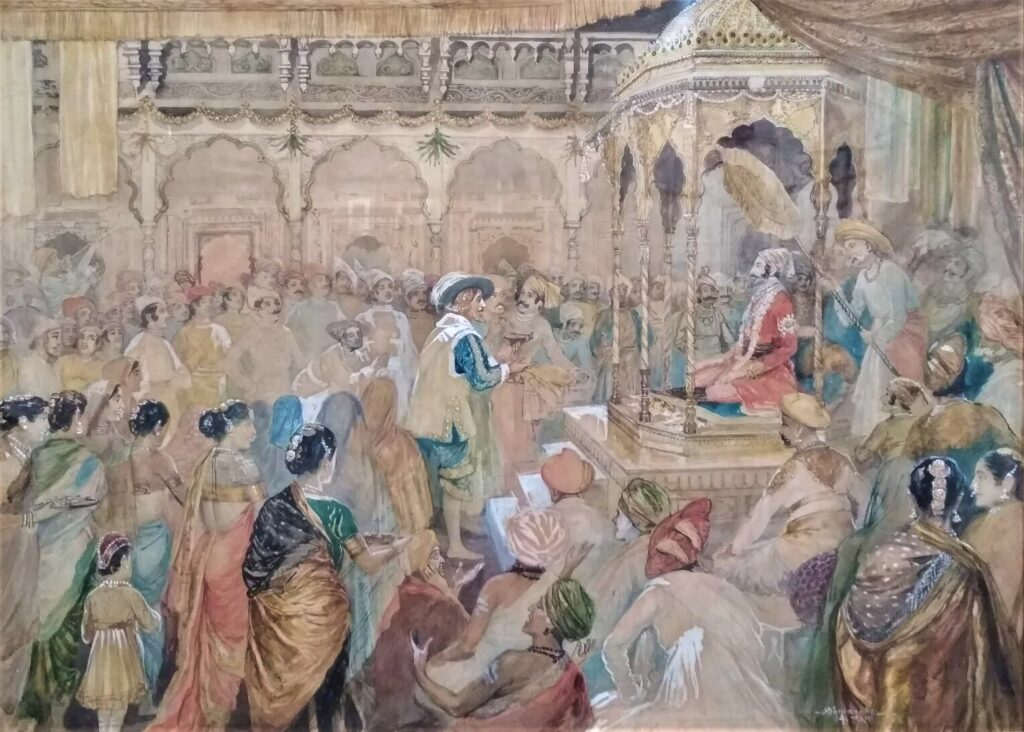
Coronation of Shivaji by M. V. Dhurandhar

Shivaji, the first ruler of the Maratha Empire aimed to standardise revenue demand and reduce unfair exactions and form a centralised system of taxation.

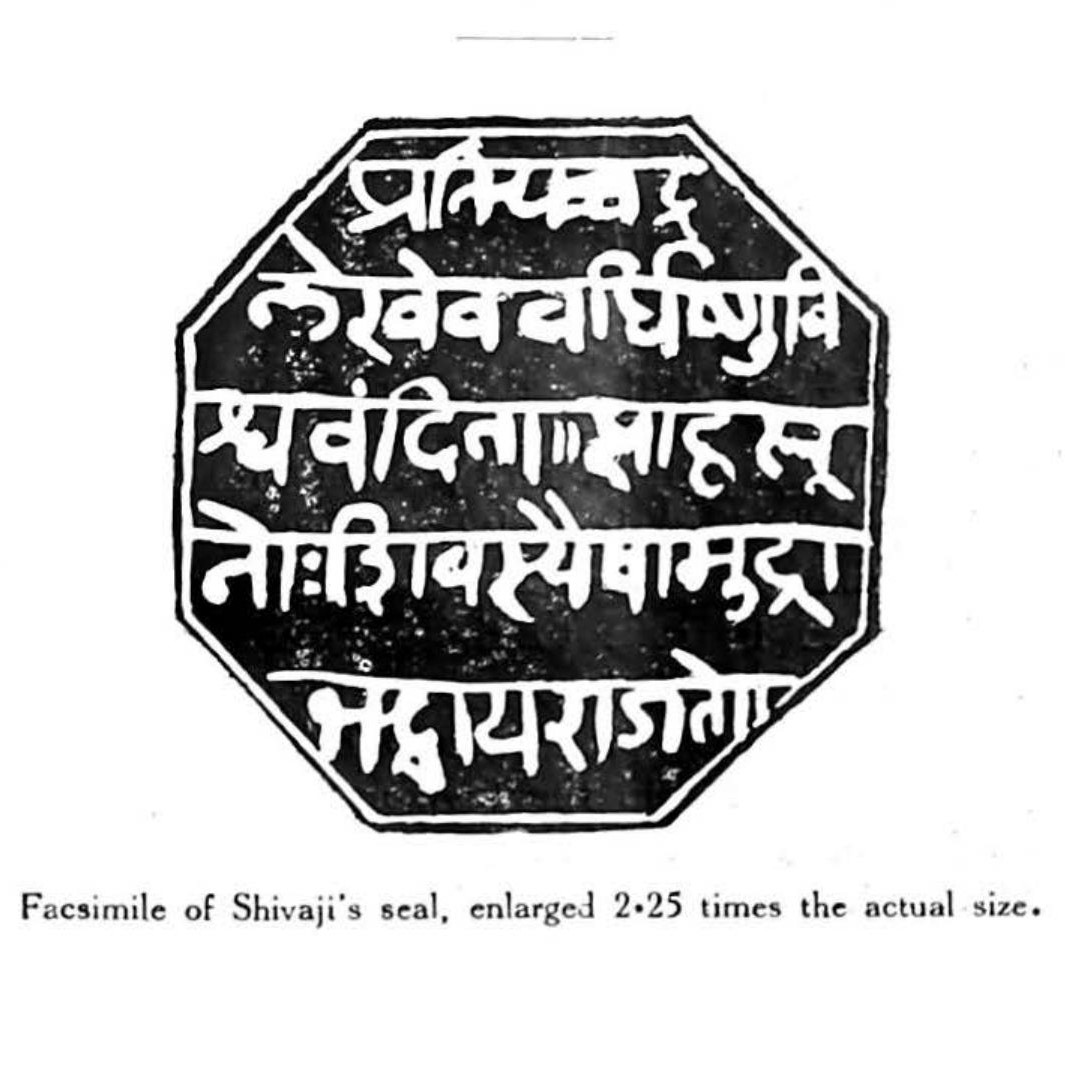
Seal of Chatrapati Shivaji

Out of the Ashta Pradhan, Amatya or Mujumdar - Finance Minister, managed the accounts of the Empire. In 1662 Nilo Sondeo was appointed as Mujumdar. In 1674, at the Coronation ceremony, the post Mujumdar was renamed as Amatya and the title was solely bestowed Ramchandra Pant Amatya.

== Textile production ==
Textiles constituted the most important manufacturing activity within the Maratha economy. Cotton weaving, in particular, was widespread across the Deccan region and formed an essential component of both local consumption and inter-regional trade.

Production was typically carried out by artisan households, using traditional techniques and tools. Unlike the highly commercialised textile centres of Bengal or Gujarat, production in Maratha territories tended to be more regionally oriented and less export driven, however it still participated in wider Indian trade networks.

== Revenue/Taxation system ==
Chauth (from Sanskrit: चतुर्थ, romanized: caturtha, lit. 'one fourth') was a regular tax or tribute imposed from the early 18th century by the Maratha Empire in the Indian subcontinent. It was an annual tax nominally levied at 25% on revenue or produce, hence the name, on lands that were under nominal Mughal rule. The sardeshmukhi was an additional 10% levy on top of the chauth. A tribute paid to the king, it was started by Koli Maharaja Som Shah of Ramnagar.

These taxes constituted a significant portion of Maratha income and were extracted primarily from vassal Mughal states and neighbouring regions.

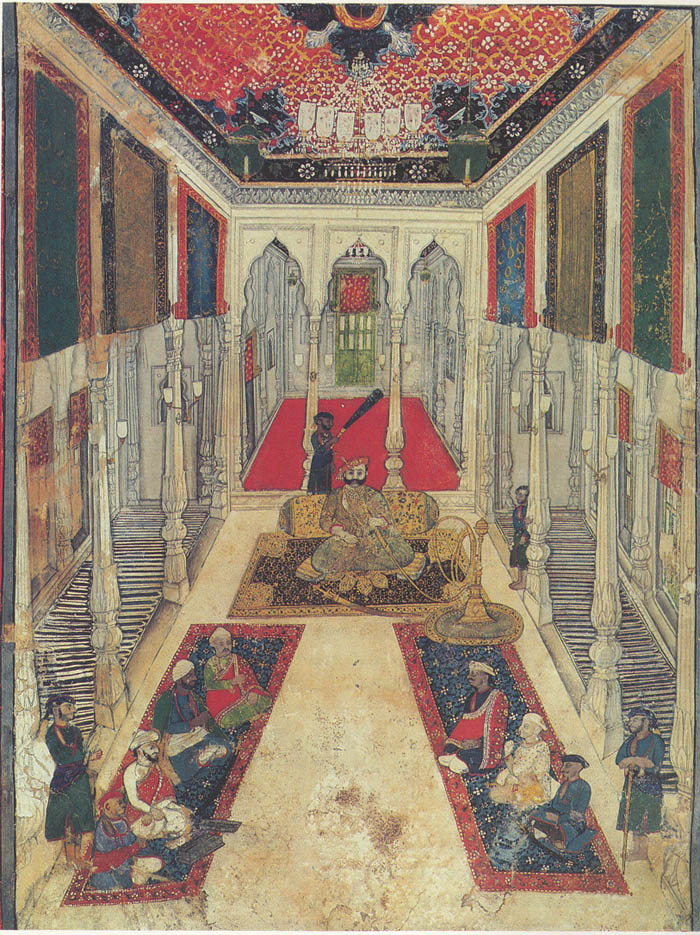
Maratha darbar or court.

In 1719, the Mughal emperor Rafi ud-Darajat granted Chhatrapati Shahu Raje Bhonsale the chauth and sardeshmukhi rights over the six Deccan provinces. The revenues from chauth were divided into four parts that went to various functionaries of the Maratha Empire.

== Finance ==
The functioning of the Maratha state was heavily dependent on access to credit on merchant-bankers and moneylenders known as Zamindars. They financed politic campaigns and administrative expenses, linking the Maratha political control to wider commercial and financial networks. This was essential for the functioning of the Maratha economy.

Each district (Pargana) had a chief called Deshmukh and the record keepers were called Deshpande. The lowest administrative unit was the village. Village society in Marathi areas included the Patil or the head of the village, collector of revenue, and Kulkarni, the village record-keeper. These were hereditary positions. The village also used to have twelve hereditary servants called the Balutedar. The Balutedar system supported the agrarian sector. Servants under this system provided services to the farmers and the economic system of the village. In exchange for their services, the balutedars were granted complex sets of hereditary rights (watan) to a share in the village harvest under a Barter system.

== Trade ==
Trade played a secondary but important role in the Maratha economy. Local markets facilitated the exchange of agricultural produce, textiles, and livestock to other neighbouring kingdoms and coastal regions. A well developed internal trade network connected major regional trading centers such as Pune and Nagpur with Gujarat and other parts of North India.

The Marathas also promoted trade via ports like Chaul, Dabhol, and Surat, asserting control over coastal trade.

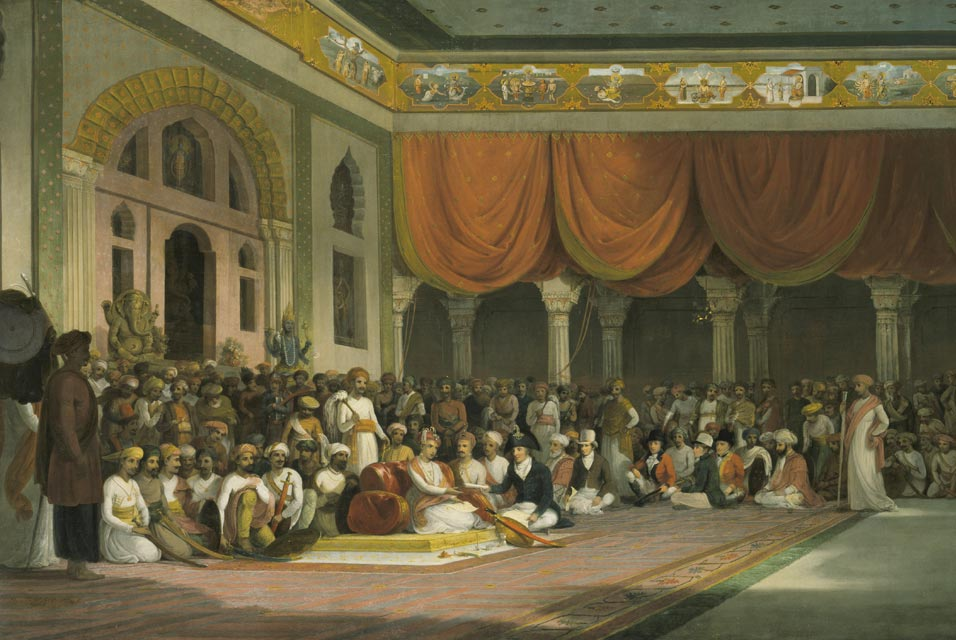
Durbar of Peshwa Madhavrao II

The Marathas did interact with some European trading companies, particularly along the western coast. However, trade remained minimal between two parties. Over time the Maratha economy was slowly integrated into a pre existing inter regional and wider Indian Ocean trade network with links to Deccan markets, West Asia and even Europe.

== Industrialization ==
Some authors such as Frank Perlin and Sanjay Subrahmanyam have classified the eighteenth century Deccan economy in proto-industrial terms. Perlin argued that pre-colonial South Asian economies, including those under Maratha influence, were marked by significant commercialization, monetization, and integration into wider market networks, rather than being confined to subsistence production. These features showed some semblance to the economic patterns of a proto-industrial state.

However, Perlin did not explicitly classify the Maratha economy as proto-industrial, but rather put it within a broader understanding of pre-colonial economic structures, suggesting that some parts of the Deccan region showed of early proto-industrial development.

== See also ==
- Economic history of India
- Economic history of the Indian subcontinent
