= Gambhirgad =

Fort in Maharashtra, India

Gambhirgad Fort
- Part of Palghar Hill Range
- Palghar district, Maharashtra
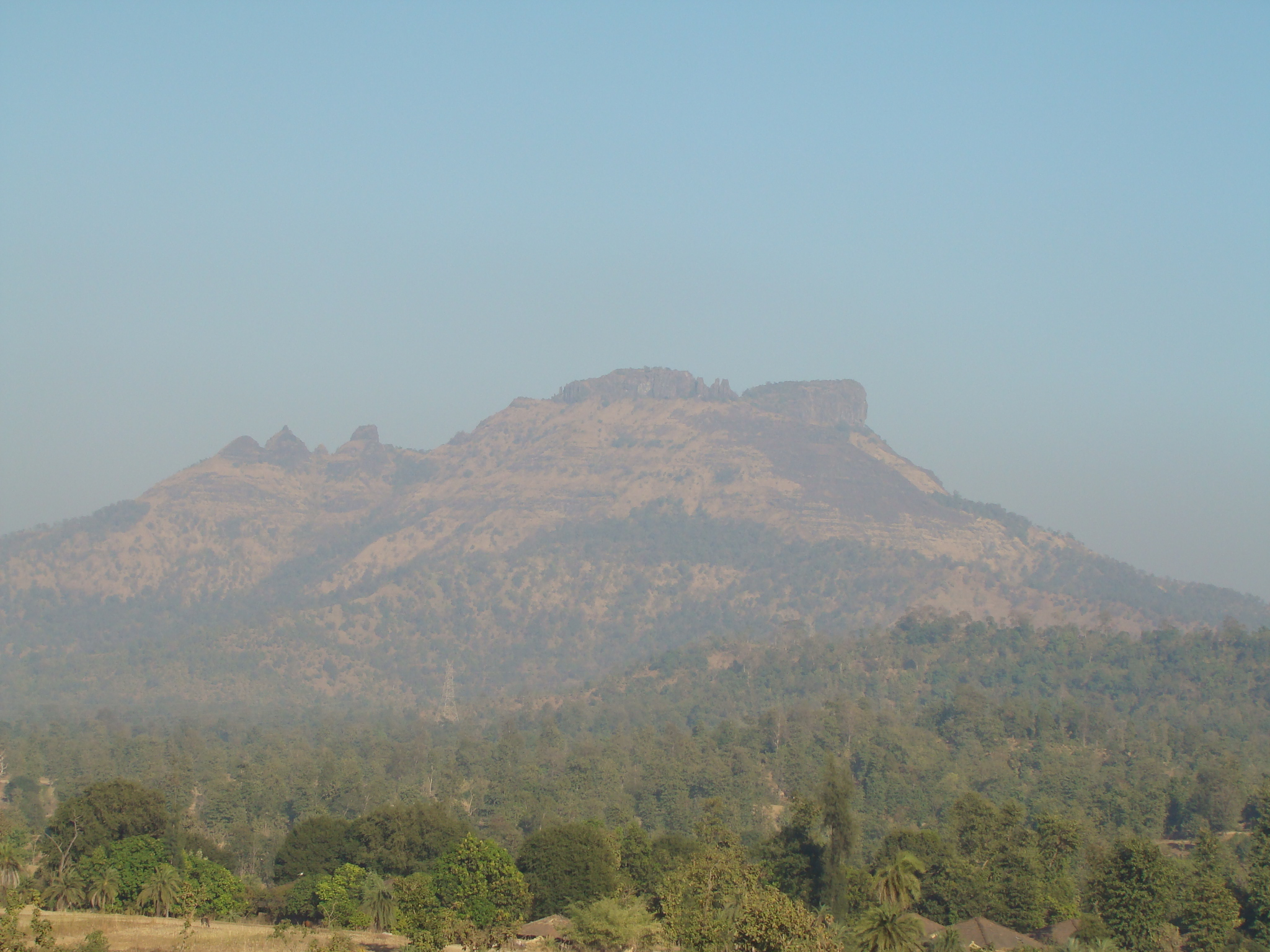
- Gambhirgad fort

Site information
- Type: Hill fort
- Owner: Government of India
- Controlled by: India (1947-)
- Open to the public: Yes
- Condition: Ruins

Location
- Shown within Maharashtra
- Location within Maharashtra Location within India
- Coordinates: 20°03′18.3″N 73°03′01.5″E
- Height: 2252 Ft.

Site history
- Materials: Stone

Gambhirgad Fort is a fort located 58 km from Dahanu, Palghar district, of Maharashtra. This fort is less important fort in Palghar district. The fort is in ruins and restoration is to be done.

== History ==
Gambhirgad Fort was part of Jawhar State. When Jayabha Mukne became the sole master of Jawhar, He gave the gambhirgad fort to a Warli chief. Latter it was owned by Jawhar State government.

== How to reach ==
The nearest town is Khanvel which is 20 km from District Silvassa. And second Kasa which is 26 km from Dahanu. The base village of the fort is Patilpada which is 32 km from Kasa. There are good hotels at Kasa, now tea and snacks are also available in small hotels at Saiwan. The trekking path starts from the hillock south of the Patilpada. The route is medium level but safe and wide. There are no trees on the trekking route. It takes about 2.5 to 3 Hours to reach the entrance gate of the fort.

== Places to see ==
There are water cisterns, small temple and a bastion on the fort. It takes about an hour to visit all places on the fort.

== See also ==
- List of forts in Maharashtra
- List of forts in India
- Marathi People
- List of Maratha dynasties and states
- Maratha War of Independence
- Battles involving the Maratha Empire
- Maratha Army
- Maratha titles
- Military history of India
