= Hiradpada =

Village in Maharashtra

- Village
- Interactive map of Hiradpada
- Coordinates: 19.9971441°N 73.2186949°E
- Country: India
- State: Maharashtra
- District: Palghar
- Tehsil: Jawhar

Languages
  - Official: Marathi
- Time zone: UTC+5:30 (IST)
- PIN: 401603

Hiradpada is a village in Jawhar tehsil, in Palghar district of Maharashtra, India. It is one of 109 villages in Jawhar Block, along with villages like Dabhosa and Sarsun.

About 12 km from Jawhar block, the Hiradpada falls, attract tourists. The height of the falls is 300m.

Nearby railway station of Hiradpada is Thane. Its post office is Jamsar. The village is known for a waterfall 0.5 km away. it is also known for the Adivasi community and their unique culture like dhol nach, tarpa nach and varli painting.

== Education ==
=== Schools ===
1. A. PRI. ASHRAM SHALA, HIRADPADA was established in the year of 2003 and is run by Pvt. Aided Management. A.PRI.ASHRAM SHALA, HIRADPADA is a Co-Educational and the medium of instruction is/are Marathi language.
2. Z. P. SCHOOL, HIRADPADA was established in the year of 1977 and is run by Local Body Management. Z.P.SCHOOL, HIRADPADA is a Co-Educational and the medium of instruction is/are Marathi language.
