= Jayaba Mukne =

First Koli King of Jawhar State

The Jayaba or Jaideoraoji Mukne, also known as Paupera and Jagappa Nayak Mukne, was first Koli ruler of Jawhar State. His name was also spelled as Jayaba Mukne, Jayaba Mookna, Jayab Mookney, Joya Mookney, Jayab Mukne, and Jayaba Mukna. He founded the Jawhar State and Mukne Dynasty in 1306 which ruled for over six hundred years, till 1947.

== History ==
Mukne built the Mahalakshmi Temple, Dahanu on the installation of the flag of Jawhar. According to peoples, he had a small mud fort at Mukane near Tal pass as a Polygar. Once, visiting at a shrine at Pimpri, he was blessed by five mendicants and saluted as Raja of Jawhar. Thereupon he marched northwards and was acknowledged by peoples of Peint and Dharampur. He went to Surat and as far north as Kathiawar in Gujarat. There he remained for seven years. On his return from Kathiawad, he went to Jawhar and conquered it. He married Rani Mohanabai of Dharmagad. Rani gave birth to two sons named Nem Shah and Holkar Rao Mukne. After his death, he was succeeded by his elder son Nem Shah on 5 June 1343. Nem Shah was recognized as a Raja of Jawhar and given the title of Shah by Sultan of Delhi Sultanate Muhammad bin Tughluq.
