= Shirpamal =

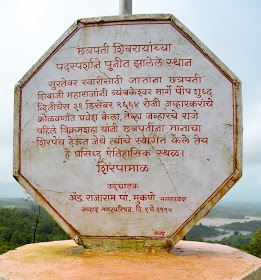
- शिरपामाळ

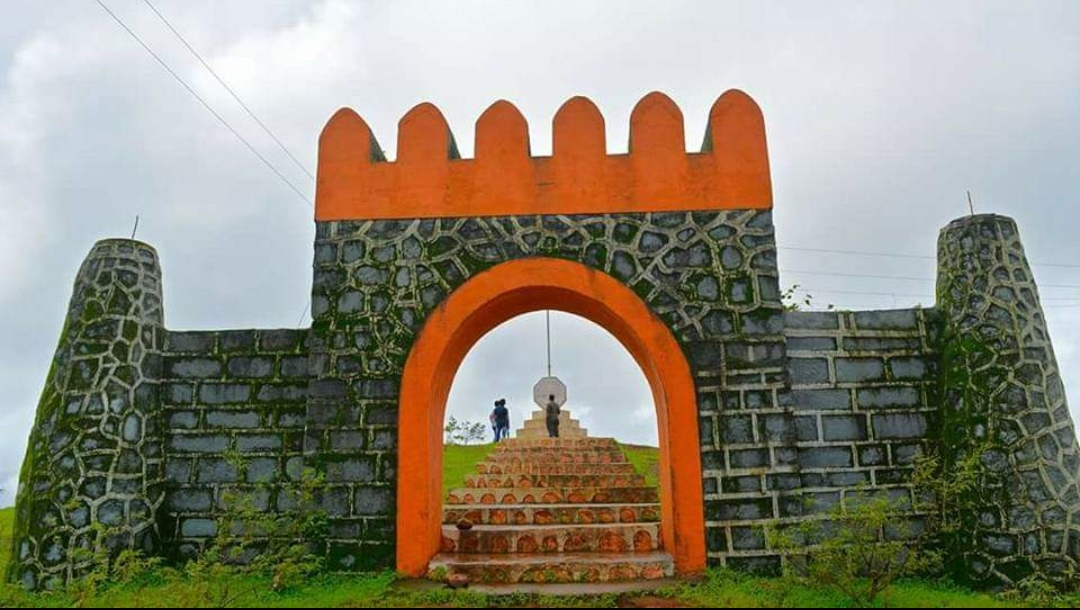

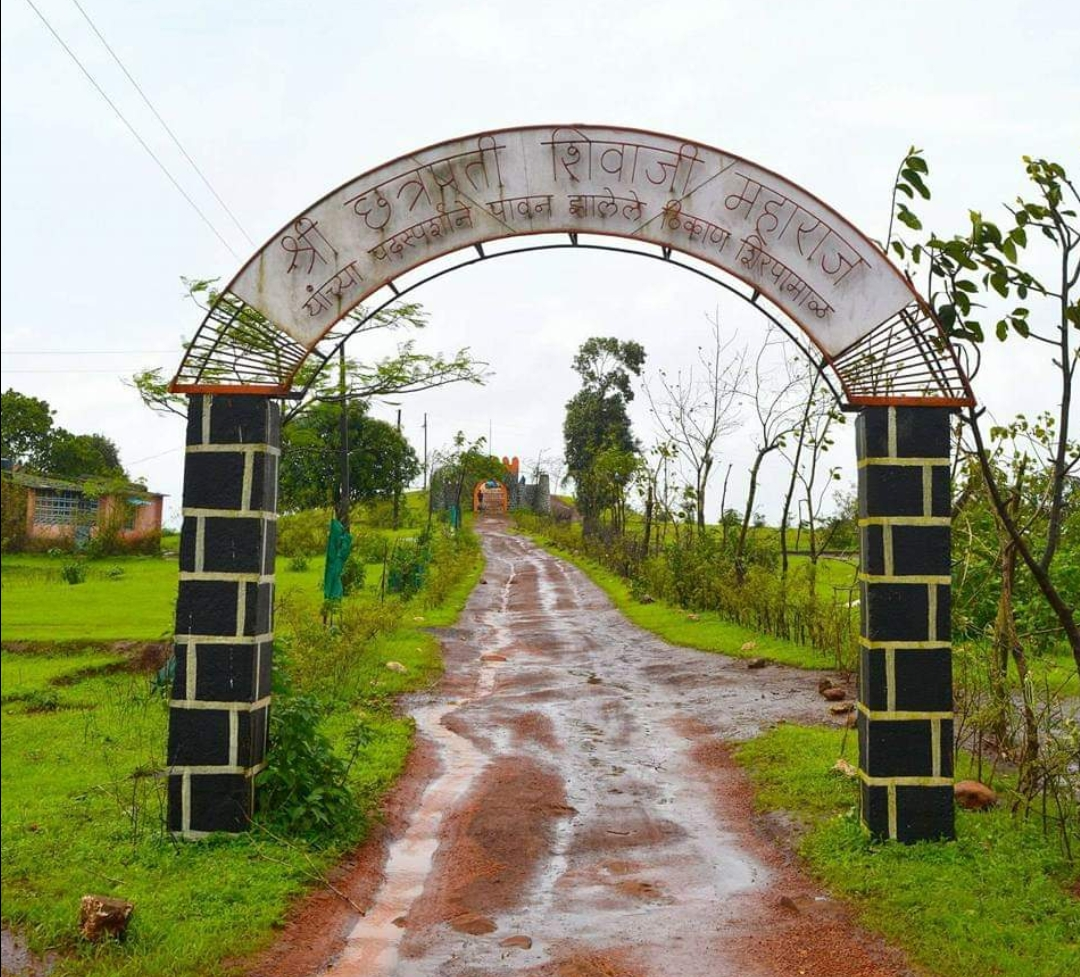
- Konkan; Jawhar, Maharashtra, 401603; India

Information
- Type: Destination
- Religious affiliation: Hindu
- Patron saints: Chhatrapati Shivaji and Vikramshah Mukne
- Established: 1664
- Founder: Vikramshah Mukne
- Authority: Maharashtra government

Shirpamal is a site on Jawhar Nashik Road in Dharampur, near to Jawhar City in Maharashtra, India.

Shivaji marched to Surat with the Maratha army. They set up camp near the princely state of Jawhar and met the Koli ruler Vikramshah Mukne of Jawhar. Together they invaded Surat. Shirpamal was the meeting place of Shivaji and Vikramshah and has since become a historical monument. Chhatrapati Shivali Visited Shirpamal at Jawhar on 31 December 1664. On 1 May 1995 Rajaram Mukne, President of Jawhar Municipal Council erected a memorial of Shivaji at this place to commemorate this historic moment.
