= R.P. Mukne =

Rajaram Pandurang Mukne
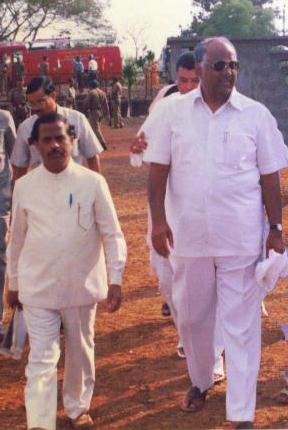
- Rajaram Mukne With Sharad Pawar, Union Minister of India

Secretary: Maharashtra State Nationalist Congress Party

Personal details
- Born: 5 July 1940 (age 86) Jawhar, India
- Profession: Advocate

R.P. Mukne is an Indian politician. His full name is Rajaram Pandurang Mukne, popularly known as "Anna" or "Ramrao Mukane". He was President of Jawhar Municipal Council of Jawhar, a former Princely State. He was elected unopposed as a President of Jawhar Municipal Council (1994 to 1997). He is a leader of the Nationalist Congress Party (NCP). Mukne is lawyer by profession who has been appointed as secretary of the NCP for the state of Maharashtra. He is more social activist than a politician working for rural, Adivasi and needy people in Thane District from last 4 decades.

He was born in the Jawhar State on 5 July 1940 to Pandurang & Anusaya Mukane. His Mother Anusaya passes away at the age of 101. Mukne studied at University of Mumbai, earning a B.A.LLB. While serving in Central Government for eight years, he acquired higher education and obtained Degree in Law. He resigned his government post in Mumbai to practice law in remote rural areas with the motivation to help tribal and scheduled caste people and other disadvantaged populations and to be able to actively participate in social work. Mukne is well known personality in legal & social field in Thane District. He is first advocate in the Thane District among Dalits and Adivasis; and he has 45 year's long experience in profession as lawyer as will as social work, political work, article writing, and administration. Mukne is Vice President of Maharashtra State All-India Depressed Classes League founded by Jagjivan Ram who was Deputy Prime Minister of India. In 1994 he was elected unopposed for the post of President of Jawhar Municipal Council from 1994 to 1997.

== Political & social positions ==
Mukne entered active politics becoming the founding President of Jawhar Taluka Congress Committee and became councilor of Jawhar City from 1972 to 1977 and later on elected as a vice-president of Jawhar Municipal Council from 1977 to 1980 and 1985 to 1988 for two terms.

In 1994 he was elected unopposed for the post of President of Jawhar Municipal Council from 1994 to 1997. He was elected twice as director to Thane District Central Cooperative Bank for 1993 to 2003. As a President of Taluka Congress Committee from 1978 to 1999, he worked for the implementation of Twenty Point Garibi Hatao anti-poverty program and Sanjay Gandhi Swavlamban va Niradhar Yojana.

After separating from the Indian National Congress (INC), Sharad Pawar founded NCP in 1999. So Mukane resigned from INC and joined NCP. He was the first President of Jawhar Taluka NCP. In 2000 he was appointed as a Vice-President of Thane District NCP. Mukne is state secretary of the NCP in Maharashtra.

Advocate Mukne demanded bifurcation of Thane District. Mukne demanded full-fledged independent Jawhar District with its headquarter at Jawhar. State government considered the demand of bifurcation but was not ready to establish district headquarter at Jawhar. Mukne fought against State Government to site the district headquarters at Jawhar. But on 1 May 2014 the foundation day of the Maharashtra State, the State Revenue Minister Balasaheb Thorat announced bifurcation of Thane District with its headquarters at "Palghar". The eight tribal-dominated talukas of Mokhada, Jawahar, Talasari, Vikramgadh, Wada, Dahanu, Palghar and Vasai included in new Palghar district. Mukne alleged that the decision to have new district headquarters at Palghar is a political one taken by the "insensitive" government under pressure of administration only for the convenience of the administrative staff of the newly created district and violation of fundamental rights, guaranteed under Articles 14 and 19 of the Constitution for tribal and backward class people of the region.

Advocate Mukne and other local social activists and political leaders challenged the decision to have new district headquarters at Palghar by filing Public interest litigation (PIL) in the Bombay High Court by opposing the Maharashtra government's decision to bifurcate Thane district and carve out a new district with its headquarters at Palghar.

== Articles ==
Mukne had written many articles on various social issues like Untouchability and Caste system in India, untouchability in political parties, about injustice to scheduled cast. He had written many articles against. One of his articles was noted by famous author Klaus K. Klostermaier in his book A Survey of Hinduism

Rajaram Mukne supported proposed 9900 MW Jaitapur Nuclear power project of Nuclear Power Corporation of India (NPCIL) at Madban village of Ratnagiri district in Maharashtra. He appeals the local citizens to be aware of selfish politicians. He wrote articles in newspaper to support the largest nuclear power generating station in the world. Government of Maharashtra republish his article on state government official website.

"कोकणवासीयांनो, मतलबी राजकारण्यांपासून सावध!". Government of Maharashtra official website.

"कोकणवासीयांनो, मतलबी राजकारण्यांपासून सावध!". Loksatta Leading International Marathi News Daily. 29 December 2010.

"NCP leaders give state government ultimatum against Palghar". news.webindia123.com. 17 July 2014.
