= Mukne dynasty =

Dynasty Of India

Mukne Dynasty
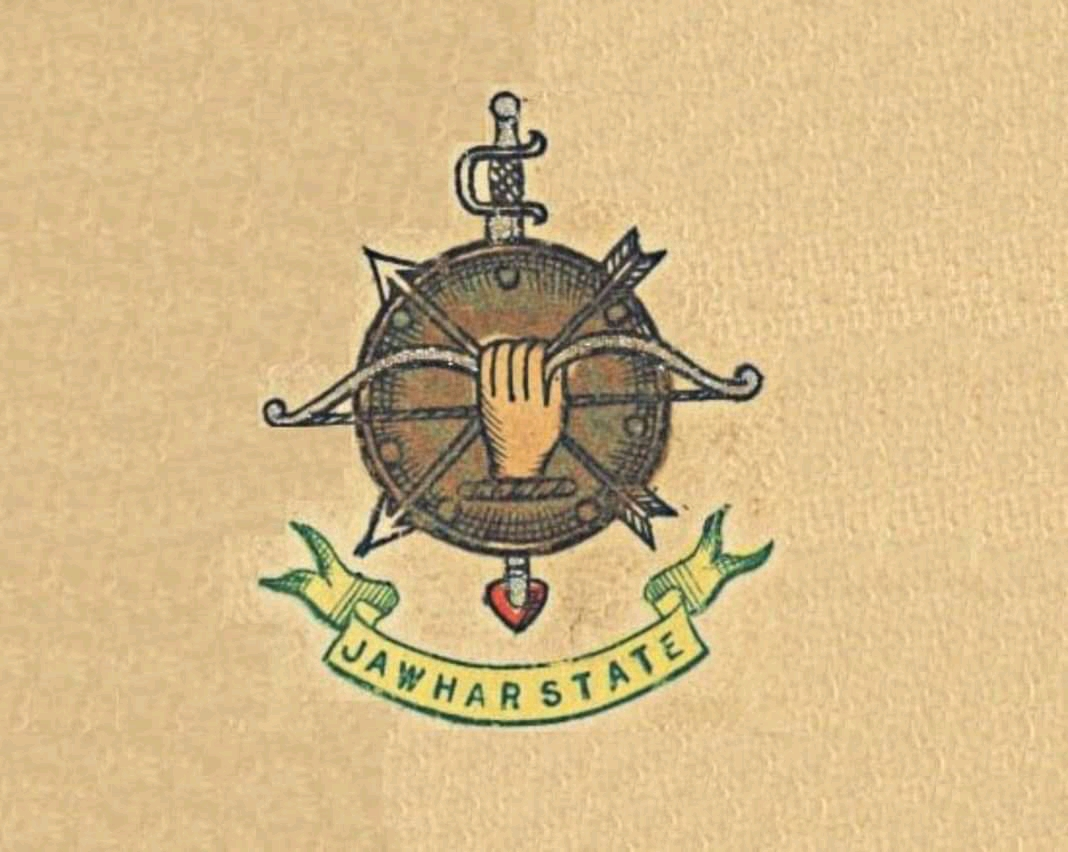
- Etymology: Mukne Village
- Founded: 1346
- Founder: Naik Jayabarao Mukne

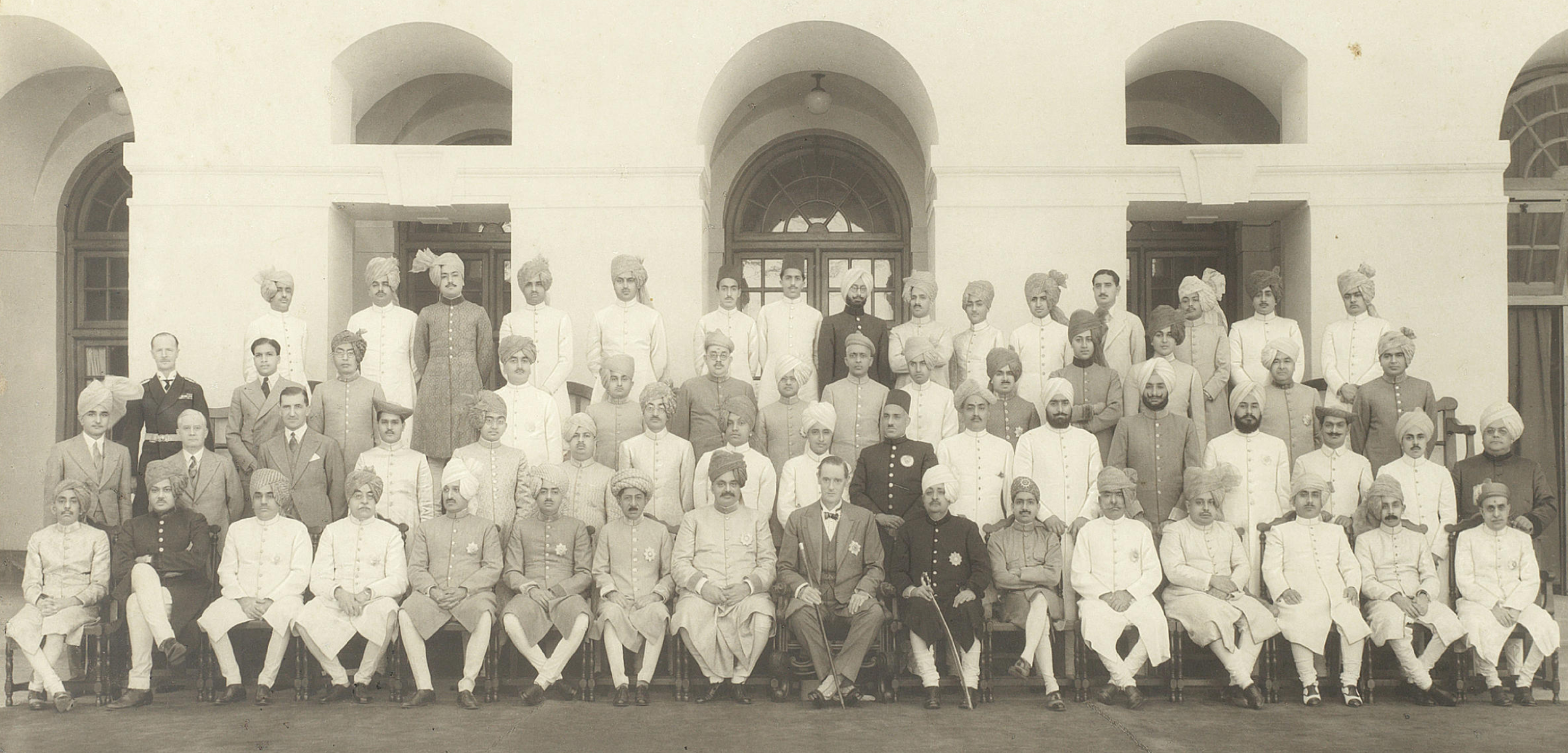
Maharaja Yashwantraoji Martandraoji Mukne, The Last Maharaja of Jawhar State seating at fourth chair in second row in the meeting of the Chamber of Princes on 17/03/1941, New Delhi, India

Mukne Dynasty or Mukane Dynasty (also spelled as Mukna, Mookna, Mookne, and Mukni) was the ruling dynasty of the Jawhar State. Koli chief Jayabha Mukne founded it in the middle of the 14th century. It traces its origin from Mukane. The Mukne Dynasty ruled Jawhar for six hundred years, up until 1947.

== Rulers ==
=== Naik (Nayaka or Polygar) ===
- 1343 – 1400 Jayabha Mukne (Nayak Jagappa Mukne)

=== Raja and Shah (Recognised by Muhammad bin Tughluq) ===
- 1400 – 1422 Nem Shah Mukne-I (Dulbarao) Mukne
- 1422 – 1435 Bhimshah (Bhimrao) Mukne
- 1435 – 1490 Deobar Rao Mukne (Mohamedshah) Mukne
- 1490 – 15** Krishnashah - I Krishnarao Mukne
- 15** – 1600 Nemshah - II Mukne
- 1640 – 1678 Vikram Shah Mukne - I
- 1678 – 1792 Patangshah - I Mukne
- 1792 – 17** Krishnashah - II Malojirao Mukne
- 17** – 1798 Vikramshah - II Gangadharrao Mukne
- 1798 – 1821 Vikramshah - III
- 1821 – Jun 1865 Patangshah - III Hanumantrao Mukne
- 29 Jun 1865 - Jul 1865 Vikramshah - IV Madhavrao Mukne
- Jul 1865 – 1905 Patangsha - IV Vikramshah Mukne
- 1905 – 1917 Patangshah - IV Malharrao Mukne

=== His Highness Raja ===
- 1917 – 10 Dec 1927 Martand Rao Mukne (Vikramshah - V) (b. ... – d. 1927)

=== His Highness Maharaja ===
- 10 Dec 1927 – 15 Aug 1947 Yashwantrao Martandrao Mukne (Patangshah V) (b. 1917 – d. 1978)
