= Jawhar State =

Princely state of India (1343–1947)

Coordinates: 19°56′N 73°16′E

Princely State of Jawhar
- Princely State of British India
- 1343–1947
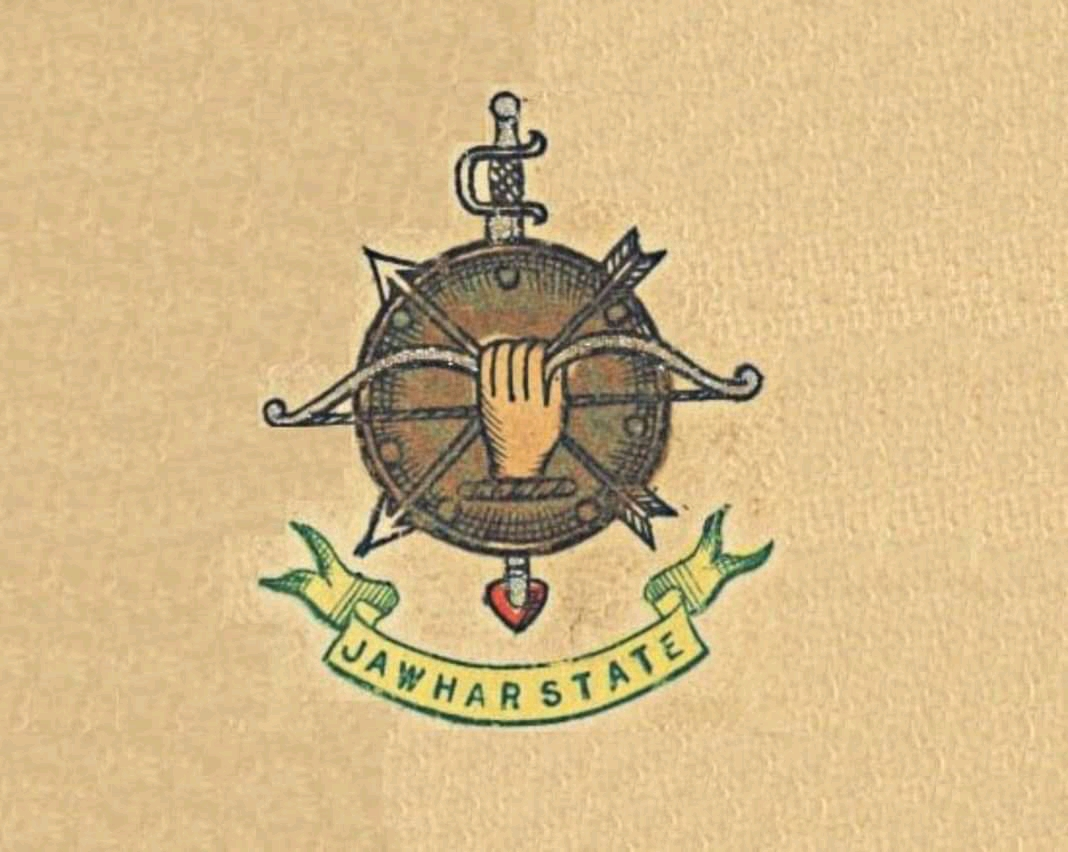
- Flag Coat of arms

- Jawhar State in Thana Agency during British India
- Capital: Jawhar
- Demonym: Koli people
- Area
  - 1901: 1,383.054 km^{2} (534.000 sq mi)
- Population
  - 1901: 50,538
- Government
  - Type: Absolute Monarchy
  - Motto: Jay Malhar (Victory to god Malhar)
- Historical era: 19th century
  - Established: 5 June 1343
  - Accession to the Union of India: 1947
Succeeded by
India
- Today part of: India

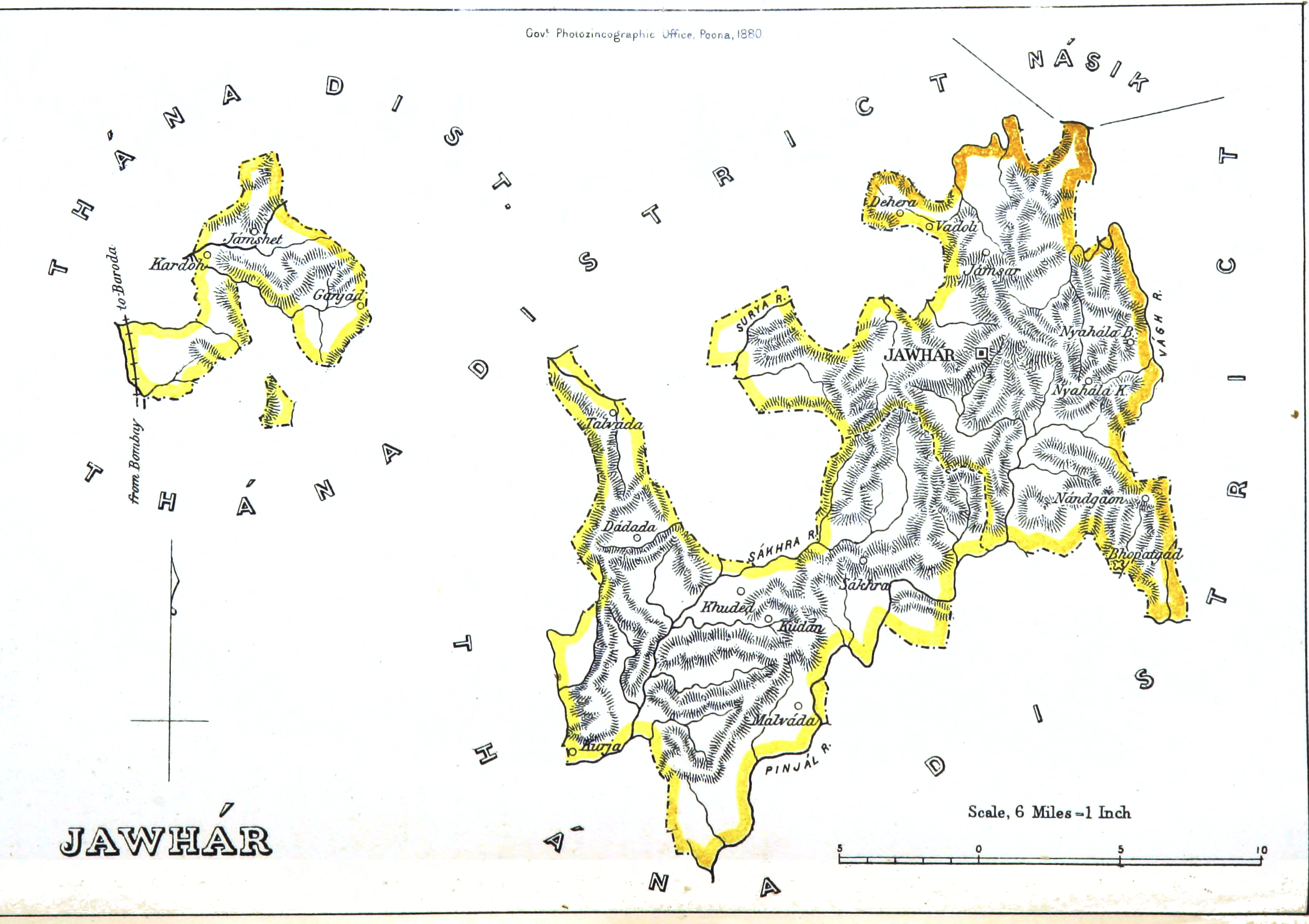
1855 map of Jawhar State

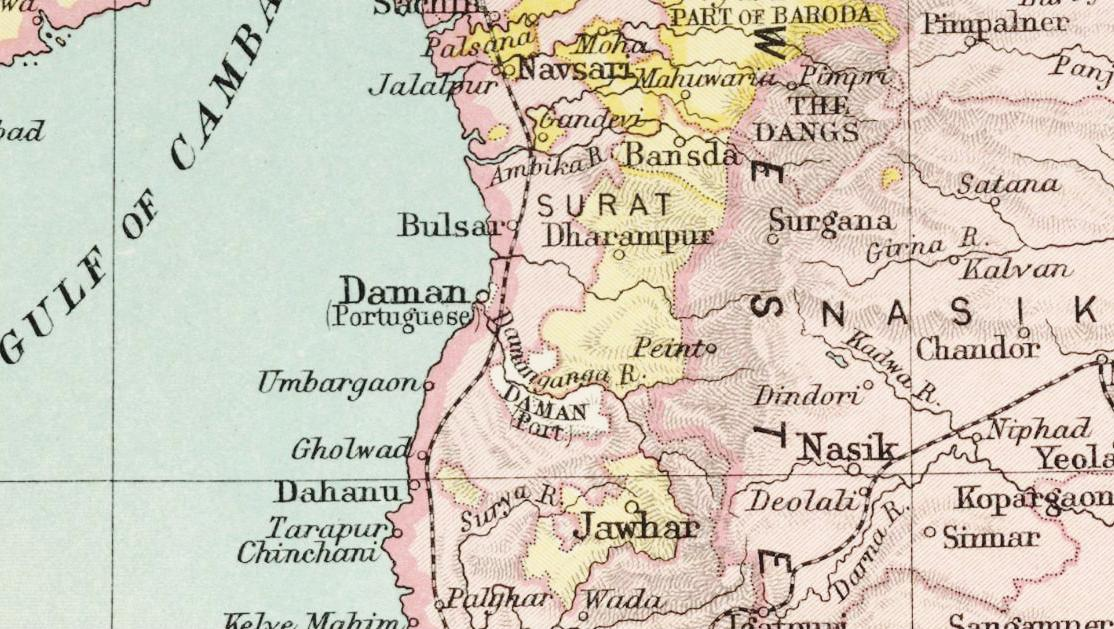
Jawhar State in the Imperial Gazetteer of India

The Jawhar State was a princely state in India. As a princely state, it became a part of Bombay Presidency during the British Raj. It was the only state belonging to the Thana Agency.

The coat of arms consisted of a shield in three parts; dexter, tenne a dexter fist holding two crossed arrows (points dexter) and a bow, all argent; sinister, argent a round shield sable bordured or, in the chief argent, a sword or pointed sinister. The flag was a rectangular saffron swallow-tail with a star of eleven rays, yellow in the canton.

== History ==
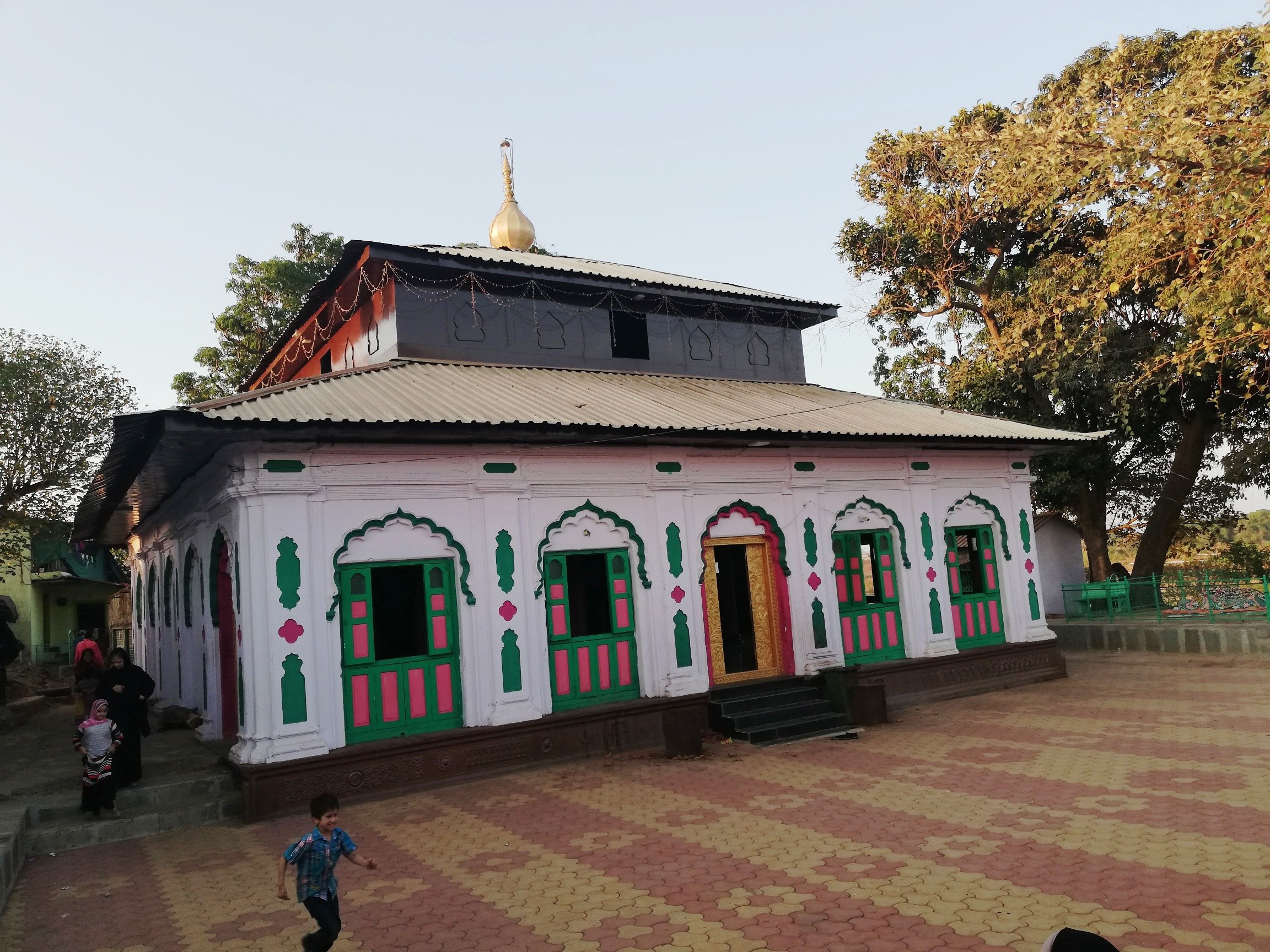
Shrine (Dargah) of Sadruddin Chishti at Pimri, which was visited by Jayebha Mukane and got blessing from the Saint to establish a State and rule it for more than 600 years.

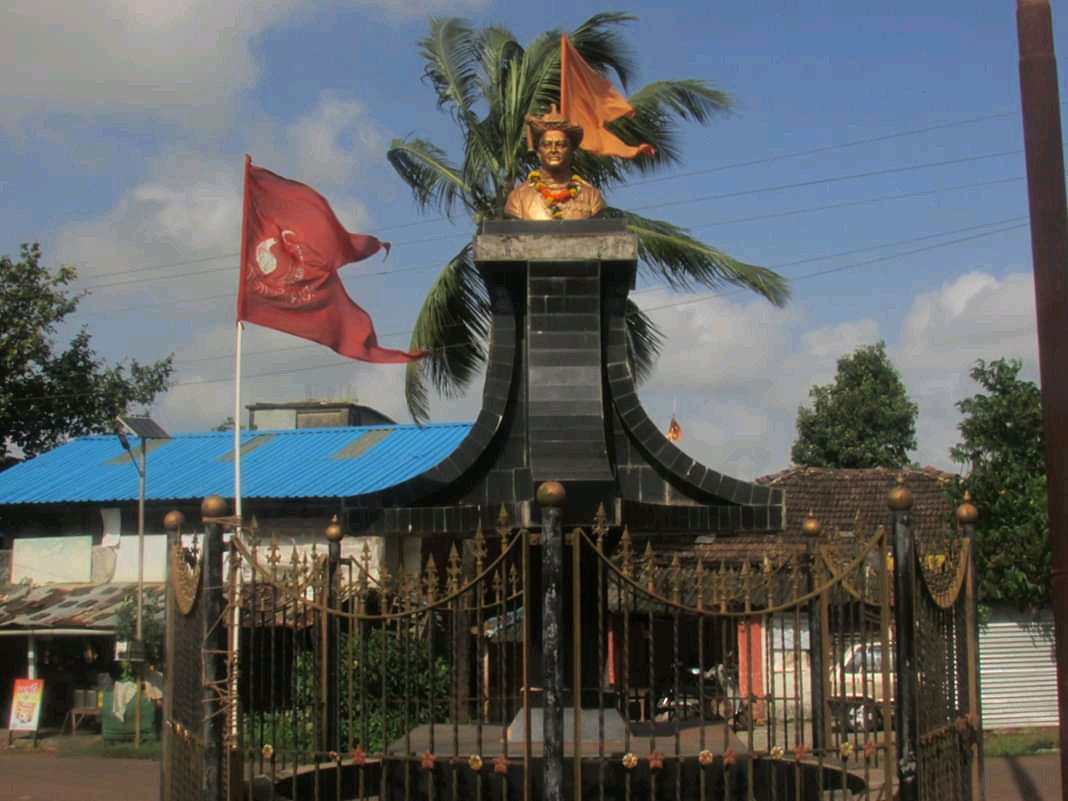
Statue of Maharaja Yashwantrao Martandrao Mukne, last ruler of the Jawhar

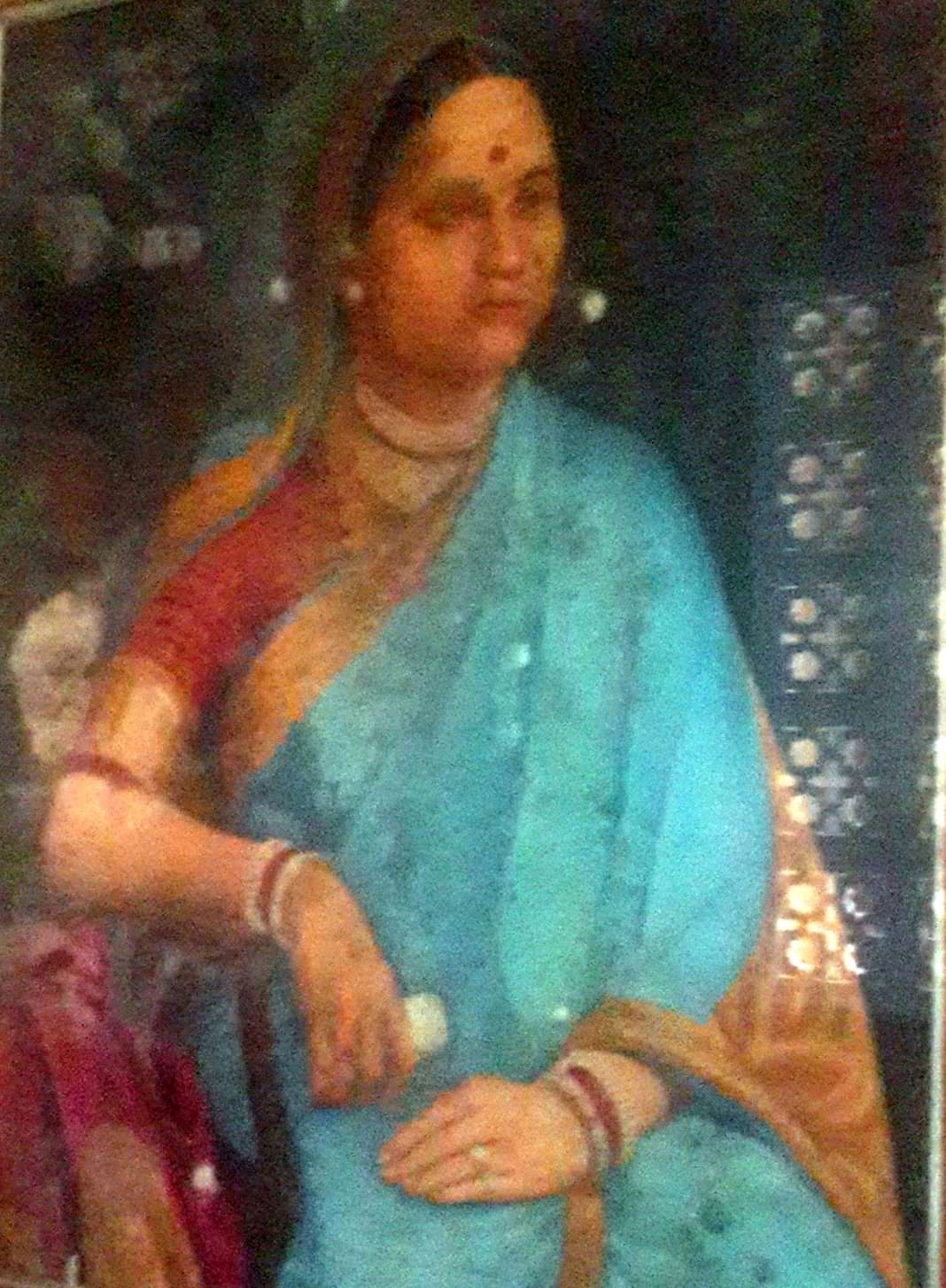
Maharani Priyamvande, last queen of the Jawhar

Up to the first Muslim invasion of the Deccan (1294) the greater part of the northern Konkan was held by Koli and Varli chiefs. Jawhar was held by a Varli chief and from him it passed to a Koli named Paupera. According to the Kolis' story, Paupera who was apparently called Jayaba, had a small mud fort at Mukne near the Tal pass. Once when visiting a shrine of Sadruddin Chishti at Pimpri, he was blessed by five Koli mendicants and saluted as the ruler of Jawhar. Paupera thereupon collected a body of Kolis, marched northwards, and was acknowledged by the people of Peint and Dharampur. He went to Surat and as far north as Kathiawar where he remained for seven years. On his return from Kathiawar he went to Jawhar and asked the Varli chief to give him as much land as the hide of a bullock could cover. The Varli chief agreed, but when the hide was cut into fine shreds or strips, it enclosed the whole of the Varli chief's possessions. Gambhirgad about twelve miles north-west of Jawhar and the country round were given to the Varli chief, and Paupera became the sole master of Jawhar.

On 6 June 1306, Jayabha Mukne, a Poligar, took possession of the fort at Jawhar. His elder son, Dulbarrao, expanded his patrimony and conquered a large territory, controlling 22 forts, comprising most of the Nasik and Thana districts, and yielding annual revenues valued at £90,000. He received recognition as ruler by Sultan Muhammad bin Tughlaq, receiving the new name of Nim Shah and the hereditary title of Raja on 5 June 1343. This event was marked by the creation of a new calendar era used within the state for over six hundred years.

The grandson of Nimshah, Deobarrao, fought a battle with the Bahmani Sultan Ahmad Shah I Wali. During his capture at Bidar, he fell in love with the Sultan's daughter. The marriage was solemnised after he converted to Islam and took the name Muhammad Shah. He returned to Jawhar and continued to rule his state unmolested, for the rest of his life. At his death, the powerful Hindu sardars and nobles refused to recognise his son as his successor, on account of his Muslim faith. In his stead, they chose the Hindu grandson of Holkarrao, the younger brother of Nimshah. Thereafter, his Hindu descendants ruled the little state in relative peace until the advent of the Maratha power.

Raja Vikramshah I met Shivaji at Shirpamal, during the latter's march to Surat and then joined him in the plunder of that city in 1664. However, he soon fell-out with the Marathas. From then on, the Marathas slowly and steadily tightened their grip on the Mukne rulers, annexing district after district and imposing ever-increasing taxes, levies and fines. They took control of the state in 1742, 1758 and 1761. Each time releasing control to the Mukne family on condition that territories were ceded and the tribute increased. In 1782 the Raja was allowed to retain for himself, a land-locked territory in the hills, yielding no more than £1,500 to £2,000 p.a.

The advent of British rule brought a degree of stability unknown for more than a century. However, development was extremely slow, given the low level of revenue receipts and haphazard organisation of the administration. Little or no improvements were made until the reign of Patangshah IV. An enlightened and well-educated ruler, he immediately set about improving conditions, streamlining the government, building roads, schools and dispensaries. At his death in 1905, conditions had improved beyond measure.

The relatively short reigns of Patangshah's two sons, Krishnashah IV and Vikramshah V, also saw steady improvements. The last named was especially diligent in improving the agricultural sector, constructing wells, securing lad rights and improving the infrastructure of the state. He contributed substantially towards the war effort during the Great War, and received a 9-gun salute in recognition of his services. His early death in 1926 ushered in a ten-year regency for his son, Yeshwantrao Patangshah V. The latter assumed full ruling powers in 1938, having received perhaps the best education by any member of his family. He continued the good work achieved under the regency by expanding development activity, encouraging the chemical, paper, textile, dyeing, printing, liquor and starch industries. The state provided free primary schooling and medical relief, ran both middle and high schools, a central library and museum, hospital and maternity home, and provided touring dispensaries for the rural areas.

=== World War II ===
At the outbreak of the Second World War, the Raja immediately volunteered for service and served for four years with the RIAF.

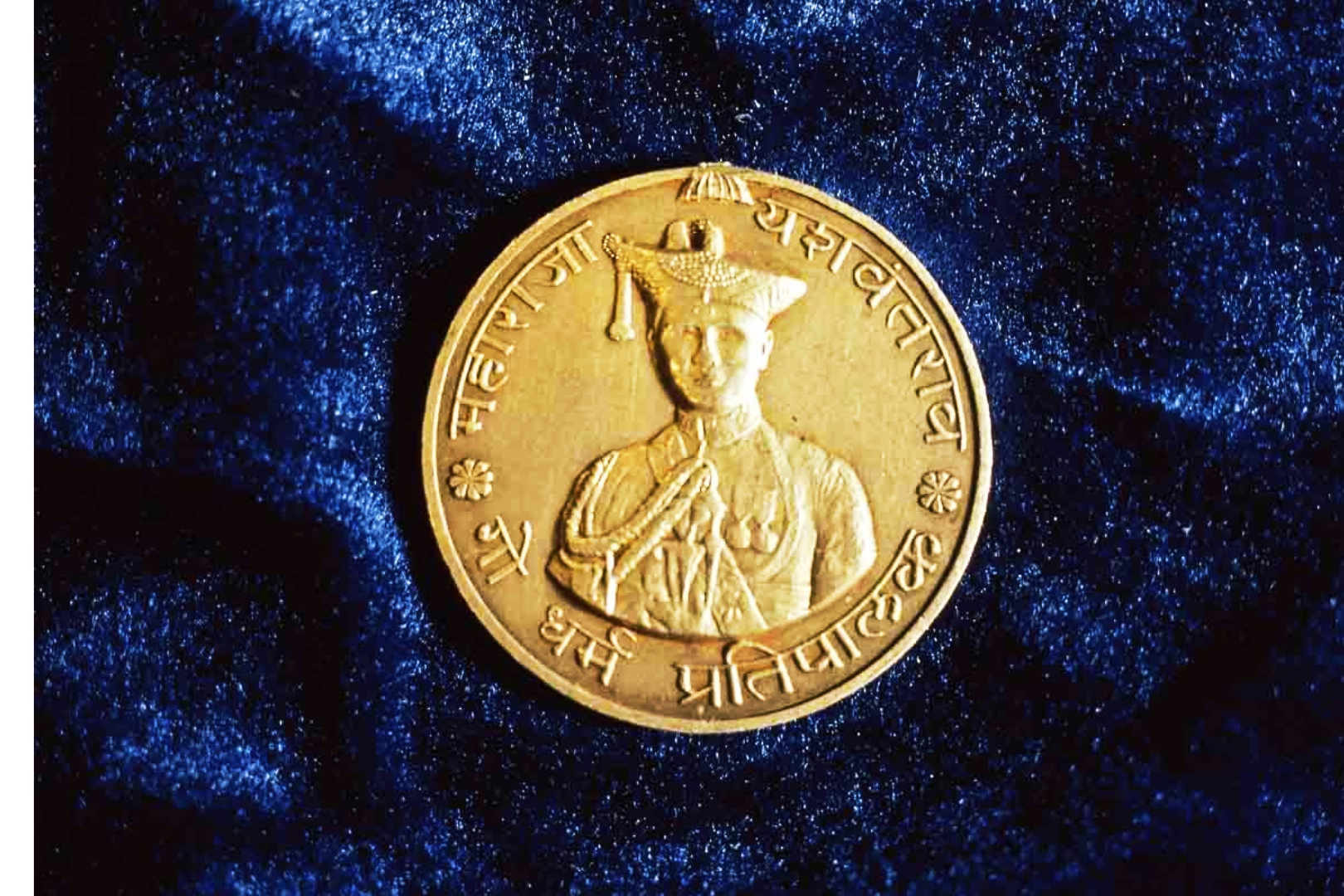
Maharaja medal, depicting Yashwantraoji Martandraoji Mukne

Yeshwantrao Patangshah V assumed the title of Maharaja, shortly before he signed the instrument of accession to the Dominion of India in 1947. He then merged his state into the Bombay Presidency early in the following year. The Maharaja Medal (Maharaja Padak), awarded in a single class, was instituted by Maharaja Yeshwantrao Patangshah V in 1947 to commemorate his assumption of the title of Maharaja and to reward those who had served the state during his reign.

Patangshah V then embarked on a political career, was a member of the national parliament and the state assembly. He died in 1978 and was succeeded by his only son, Digvijaysinhrao. The latter died in 1992, leaving his only son, Mahendrasinhrao, to represent his line.

== Rulers ==
Mukne Royal Dynasty

- [1300–1337] Maharaja Jaydeorao Mukne
- [1337-1388] Maharaja Nemshah I Dhulabarao Mukne
- [1388–1429] Maharaja Bhimshah Bhimrao Mukne
- [1429–1492] Maharaja Mohamedshah Deobarao Mukne
- [1492-1560] Maharaja Krishnashah I Krishnarao Mukne
- [1560–1630] Maharaja Nemshah II Krishnashah Mukne
- [1630-1678] Maharaja Vikramshah I Nemshah Mukne
- [1678-1694] Raja Patangshah I Vikramshah Mukne
- [1694–1710] Raja Krishnashah II Patangshah Mukne
- [1710–1742] Raja Vikramshah II Krishnashah Mukne
- [1742-1758] Raja Krishnashah III Vikramshah Mukne
- [1758-1798] Raja Patang Shah II Krishnashah Mukne
- [1798–1821] Raja Vikramshah III Patangshah Mukne
- [1821 – Jun 1865] Raja Patangshah III Vikramshah Mukne
- [29 Jun 1865-Jul 1865] Maharaja Vikramshah IV
- [Jul 1865–1905] Raja Patangshah IV Vikramshah Mukne
- [1905 – 1917] Maharaja Krishnashah IV Ganpatrao Mukne
- [1917–10 Dec 1927] Maharaja Vikramshah V Martandrao Mukne
- [10 Dec 1927–15 Aug 1947] H. H.Maharaja Patangshah V Yashwantrao Martandrao Mukne

== See also ==
- Political integration of India
- Maratha Empire
