= Kasa Khurd =

Village in Maharashtra

Kasa Khurd Kasa Kh.
- village
- Location in Maharashtra, India Kasa Khurd (India)
- Coordinates: 19.9089569°N 72.9458072°E
- Country: India
- State: Maharashtra
- District: Palghar
- Taluka: Dahanu
- Elevation: 51 m (167 ft)

Population (2011)
  - Total: 1,872
- Time zone: UTC+5:30 (IST)
- PIN code: 401607
- STD code: 02528
- 2011 census code: 551696

Kasa Khurd is a village in the Palghar district of Maharashtra, India. It is located in the Dahanu taluka.

== Demographics ==
According to the 2011 census of India, Kasa Khurd had 378 households. The effective literacy rate (i.e. the literacy rate of population excluding children aged 6 and below) was 77.54%.

Demographics (2011 Census)
	Total	Male	Female
Population	1,872	1,021	851
Children aged below 6 years	251	158	93
Scheduled caste	70	41	29
Scheduled tribe	831	430	401
Literates	,	733	524
Workers (all)	754	507	247
Main workers (total)	644	440	204
Main workers: Cultivators	196	99	97
Main workers: Agricultural labourers	73	47	26
Main workers: Household industry workers	44	29	15
Main workers: Other	331	265	66
Marginal workers (total)	110	67	43
Marginal workers: Cultivators	5	0	5
Marginal workers: Agricultural labourers	11	3	8
Marginal workers: Household industry workers	1	0	1
Marginal workers: Others	93	64	29
Non-workers	1,118	514	604
