= Goravanahalli Mahalakshmi Temple =

Hindu temple in Goravanahalli, Karnataka, India

Coordinates: 13°28′19.6″N 77°16′58.7″E

Goravanahalli Mahalakshmi Temple is a Hindu temple located in Goravanahalli, a village in Tumkur district in the Indian state of Karnataka.

== Legend ==
A poor man named Abbayya was blessed by Sri Mahalakshmi. For his unwavering devotion, Abbayya was awarded the blessing of wealth. He began doing charity work which led his home to be called Lakshmi Nivas.

Abbayya's brother, Thotadappa, joined Abbayya in his charity work. After Abbayya's death, Thotadappa performed poojas to the Goddess. He was asked by Mahalakshmi in his dreams to build her a shrine. Hence, Thotadappa built the Goravanahalli Mahalakshmi temple in dedication to the Goddess. Thotadappa started performing poojas.

== History ==
Upon arriving at Goravanahalli in 1925, Kamalamma (a pious devotee) saw the neglected state of the temple. She settled there in 1952 and started performing poojas for the Goddess. Other people started arriving, waiting in queue for the darshan of Sri Mahalakshmi. In due time, the temple gained fame through the word of mouth.
