= Mahalakshmi Temple, Mumbai =

Hindu temple in Mumbai, India

Mahalaxmi Temple
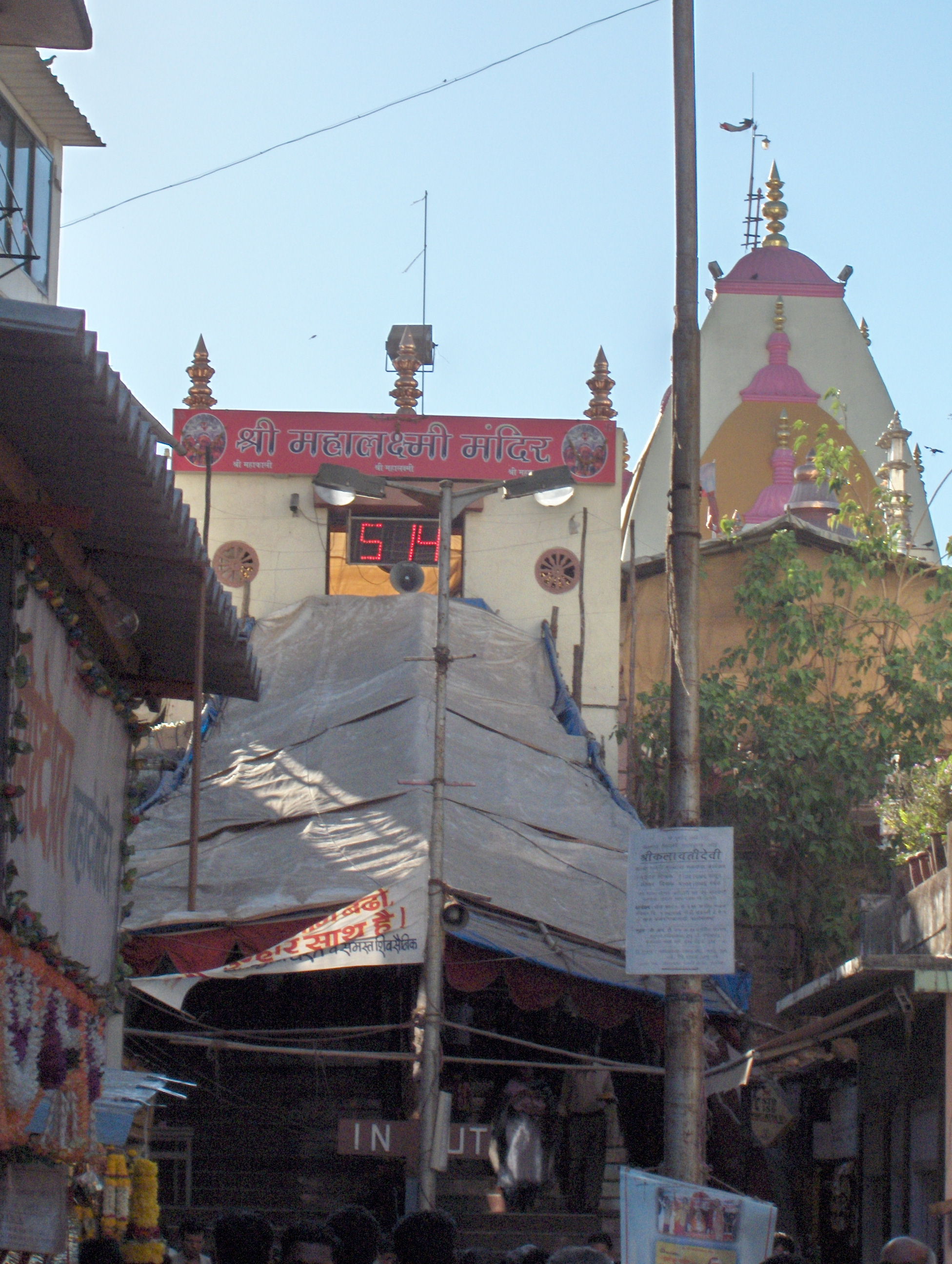

- Location in Maharashtra

Religion
- Affiliation: Hinduism
- District: South Mumbai
- Deity: Mahalakshmi
- Festivals: Lakshmi puja, Navratri, Diwali, Gudi Padwa
- Governing body: Shri Mahalaxmi Temple Trust

Location
- Location: Bhulabhai Desai Marg, Mahalaxmi West, Cumballa Hill
- State: Maharashtra
- Country: India
- Coordinates: 18°58′39″N 72°48′23″E

Architecture
- Creator: Dhakji Dadaji
- Completed: 1831

Website
- mahalakshmi-temple.com

The Mahalaxmi Temple as seen from the Arabian Sea

Mahalaxmi Temple is a Hindu temple, dedicated to Mahalakshmi, the central deity of the Devi Mahatmyam, located in Mumbai, India. It is one of the most famous temples of the city of Mumbai. The temple was built in 1831 by Dhakji Dadaji (1760–1846), a Hindu merchant. The Mahalaxmi temple contains images of the Tridevi goddesses Mahakali (Goddess of time and destroyer of demons), Parashakti Mahalakshmi (Goddess of wealth and prosperity) and Mahasaraswati (Goddess of learning and knowledge).

== See also ==
- History of Mumbai
