= Mukane, Maharashtra =

Village in Maharashtra

Mukane
- Village
- Country: India
- Postal code: 422403

Mukane or Mukne is a large village in Igatpuri Tehsil in Nashik district of Maharashtra, India. Mukane village is administered by Sarpanch (Head of Village).
