= Jawhar =

- City
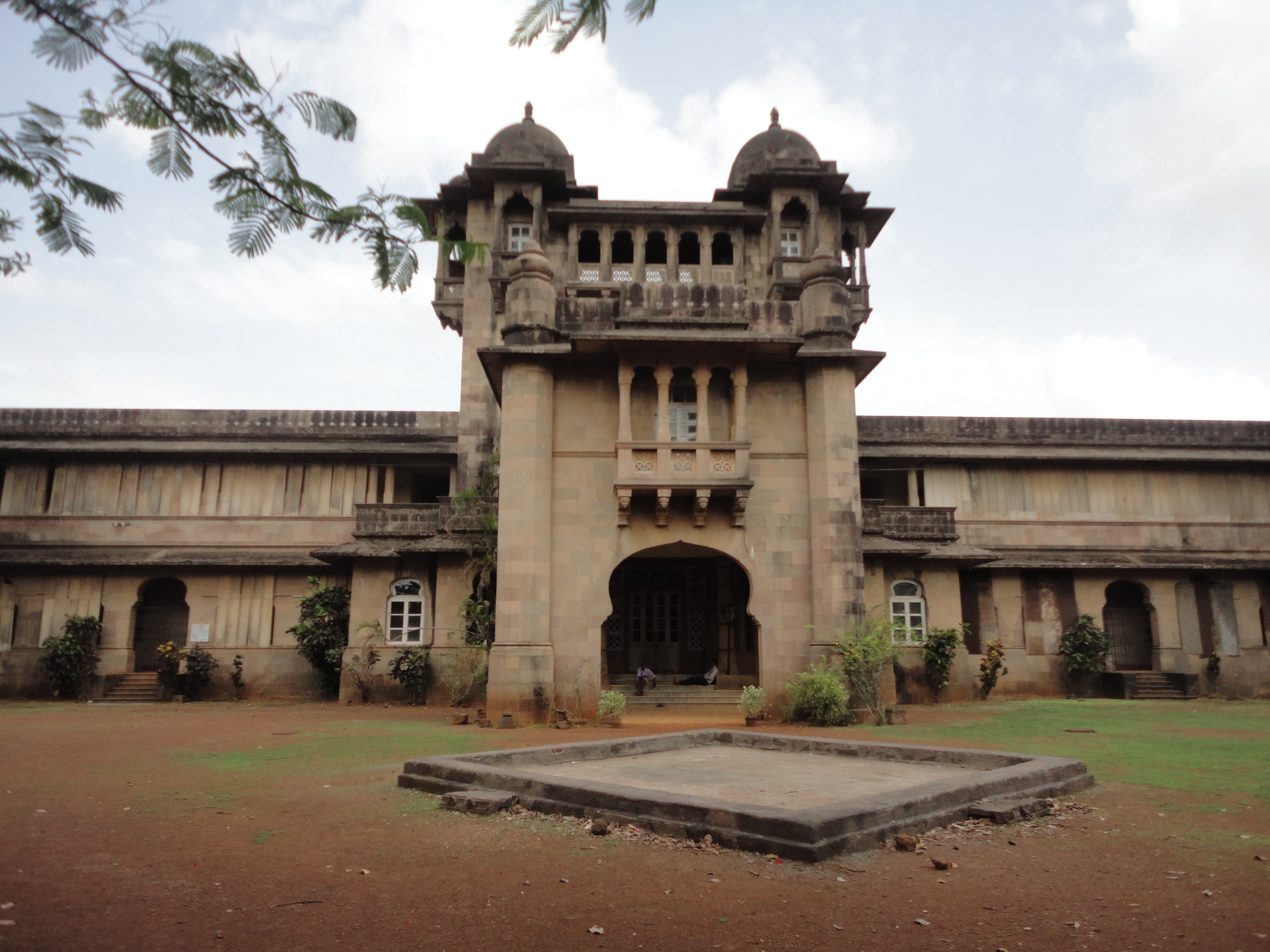
- The Jaivilas Palace

- Location of Jawhar in Maharashtra
- Coordinates: 19.92°N 73.23°E
- Country: India
- State: Maharashtra
- District: Palghar
- Founded by: Nayak Jayaba Mukne Koli king Of Jawhar State

Government
  - Type: Municipal management
  - Body: Municipal Council Jawhar
- Elevation: 447 m (1,467 ft)

Population (2010)
  - Total: 12,040

Languages
  - Official: Marathi
- Time zone: UTC+5:30 (IST)
- Pincode: 401 603
- Telephone code: 02520
- Vehicle registration: MH04 and MH48

Jawhar is a city and municipal council in the Palghar district of the Indian state of Maharashtra. The city is a part of the Konkan division, and lies 100 km north from Mumbai. Jawhar was the capital city of the erstwhile princely state of Jawhar, under the British Raj in Colonial India.

Situated in the ranges of the Western Ghats, Jawhar is one of the few remaining tribal regions of Maharashtra and is known for its vibrant Warli paintings that are a characteristic landmark of the area. Established in 1918, Jawhar is one of the oldest municipal councils in the state of Maharashtra and tourist spot near Mumbai.

== History ==
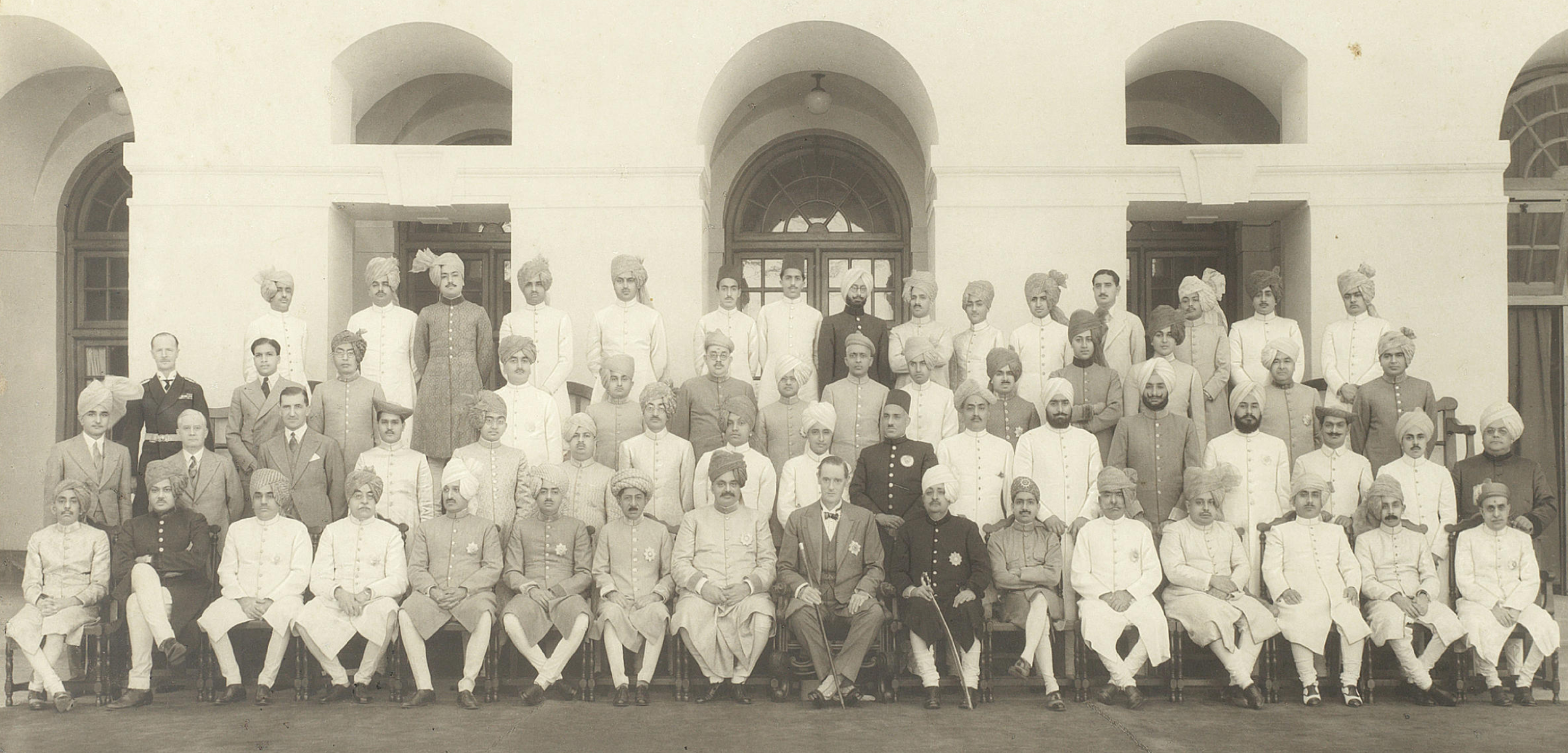
Maharaja Yashwantraoji Martandraoji Mukne, The last ruler of Jawhar who built Jai Vilas Palace, Seating at fourth chair in second row in the meeting of the Chamber of Princes in Delhi, 17 March 1941

The Jawhar state was founded by Raja Jayaba Mukne in 1343, with Jawhar as its capital. The state went through many transitions and lasted for over six hundred years until its accession into the Union of India in 1947. During the British Raj, as a princely state, it was a part of Bombay Presidency and had a 9-gun salute status. Although a capital city, Jawhar's development was largely neglected by successive rulers, due to a low revenue generation and haphazard organisation. However, Jawhar witnessed a significant development in the reign of Raja Patang Shah IV and subsequent rulers. Raja Patang Shah V (Yashswant Rao) Mukne was the last ruler of Jawhar before its formal integration in the Union of Indian in 1947.

== Geography ==
Jawhar is a hill station at 19.92°N 73.23°E. Jawhar taluka is tropical and mostly surrounded by deciduous green plants. It has an average elevation of 447 metres (1466 feet). It is about 80 km from Nashik and about 145 km from Mumbai by road.

== Climate ==
Jawhar has a tropical monsoon climate (Am) with little to no rainfall from November to May and extremely heavy rainfall from June to September with moderate rainfall in October. About more than 3000mm of rainfall is recorded in Jawhar Region, a large amount of rainfall. It's significantly more than the average annual rainfall in many regions

Climate data for Jawhar
Month	Jan	Feb	Mar	Apr	May	Jun	Jul	Aug	Sep	Oct	Nov	Dec	Year
Mean daily maximum °C (°F)	27.5 (81.5)	28.8 (83.8)	31.5 (88.7)	33.3 (91.9)	33.7 (92.7)	31.0 (87.8)	27.8 (82.0)	27.6 (81.7)	28.3 (82.9)	30.6 (87.1)	30.2 (86.4)	28.6 (83.5)	29.9 (85.8)
Daily mean °C (°F)	20.7 (69.3)	21.8 (71.2)	25.0 (77.0)	27.5 (81.5)	28.8 (83.8)	27.3 (81.1)	25.2 (77.4)	24.9 (76.8)	25.0 (77.0)	25.4 (77.7)	23.7 (74.7)	21.7 (71.1)	24.8 (76.6)
Mean daily minimum °C (°F)	14.0 (57.2)	14.9 (58.8)	18.5 (65.3)	21.7 (71.1)	23.9 (75.0)	23.7 (74.7)	22.7 (72.9)	22.2 (72.0)	21.7 (71.1)	20.3 (68.5)	17.2 (63.0)	14.8 (58.6)	19.6 (67.4)
Average precipitation mm (inches)	0 (0)	0 (0)	0 (0)	2 (0.1)	21 (0.8)	400 (15.7)	1,394 (54.9)	918 (36.1)	441 (17.4)	93 (3.7)	17 (0.7)	1 (0.0)	3,287 (129.4)

Air Quality Index= Below 10 As its green zone of district by government

== Notable sites ==
=== Jaivilas Palace ===
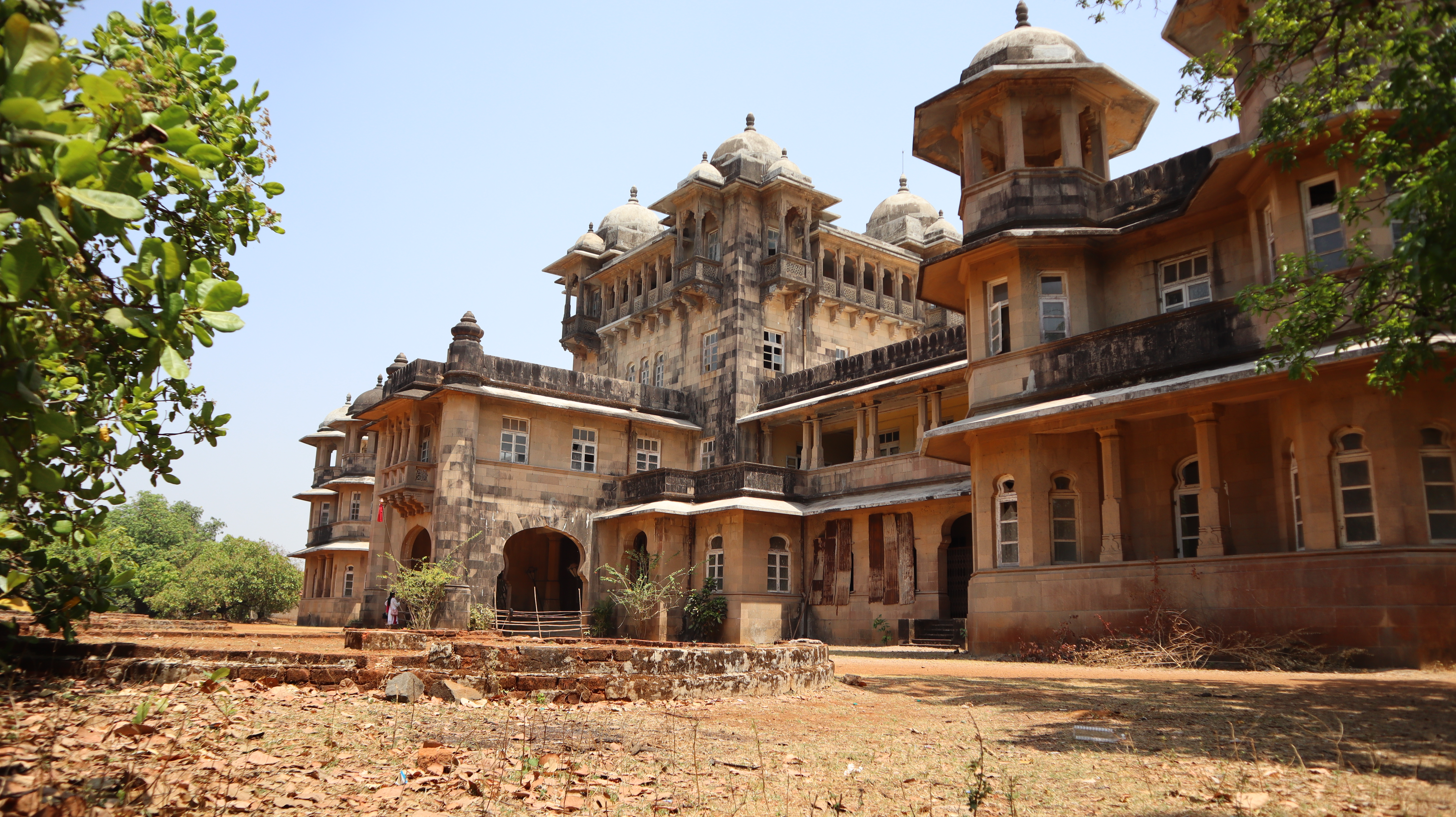
Jai Vilas Palace

The Jai Vilas Palace is a historic Indo-Saracenic style palace built by Raja Yashwantrao Martandrao Mukne. This palace is also known as Raj Bari and used to be a residential palace of the Mukne royal family. Built on a hill top, this palace blends Western and Indian architectural styles in majestic pink stones. The interiors of this palace display the rich culture and lifestyle of tribal kings of the Mukne family. The palace is surrounded by a garden with dense forest-like foliage, including many cashew trees.

The place is built in the Syenite stone, brought from a quarry at Sakhara, which is 12 km from its location. It is said that when the work of the palace was completed, the quarry from, which the stones were extracted was broken down and covered; the exact location of the quarry is lost in time. The Geological Department, of the Government of India has now taken up a task to locate it.

=== Hanuman Point ===
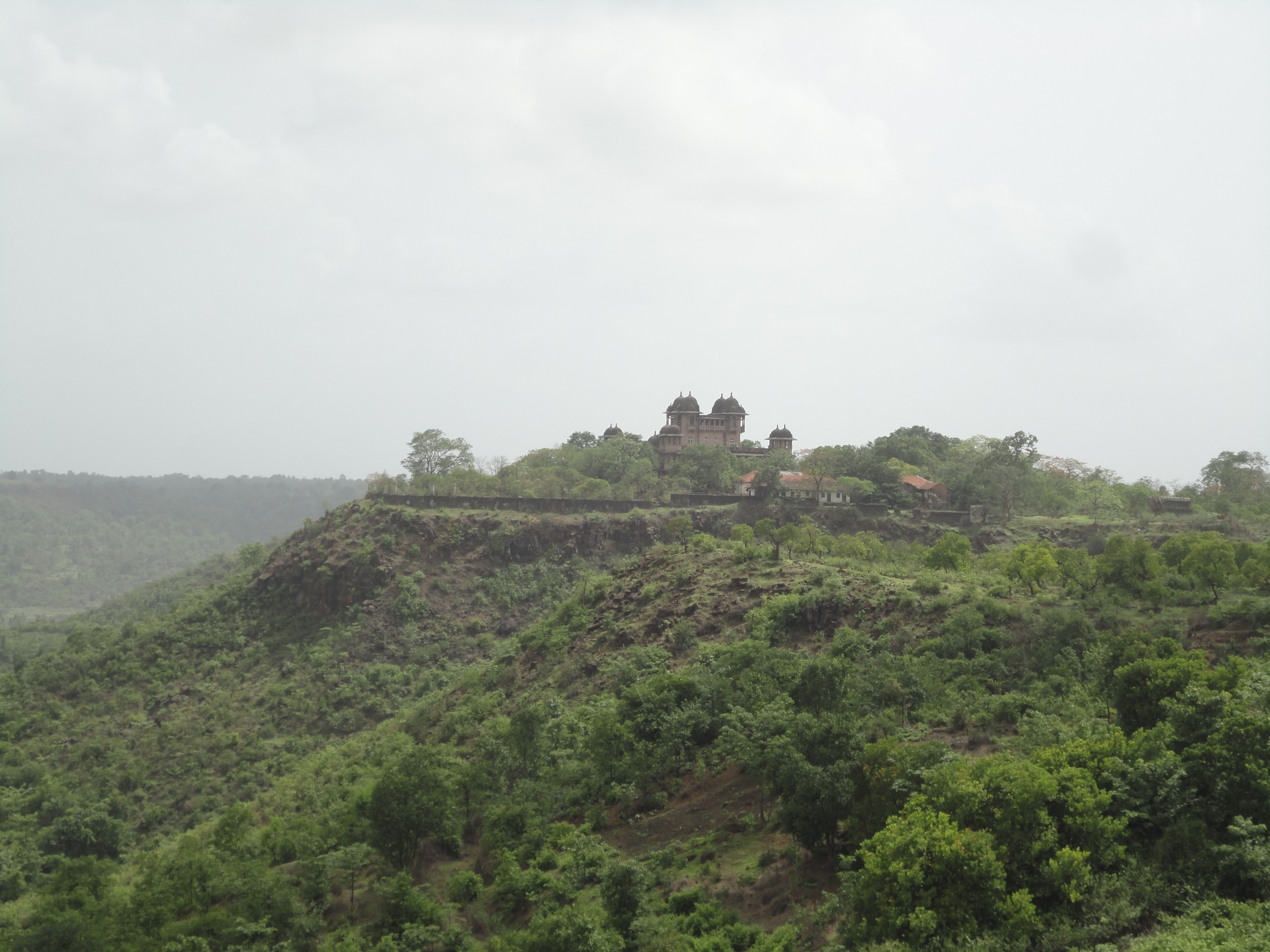
A view of the Jaivilas Palace from the Hanuman Point, Jawhar

Towards east of the city, nearly 1 to 2 km from the city center, there is an old temple of Maruti. This temple is known as Katya Maruti mandir due to a dark forest of cactus surrounding it. The temple is surrounded by valleys on three sides. The valley is nearly 500 feet deep. During renovation a view point was created near the temple, which is known as Hanuman Point. The valley is also known as Devkobacha Kada.

=== Dabhosa waterfall ===
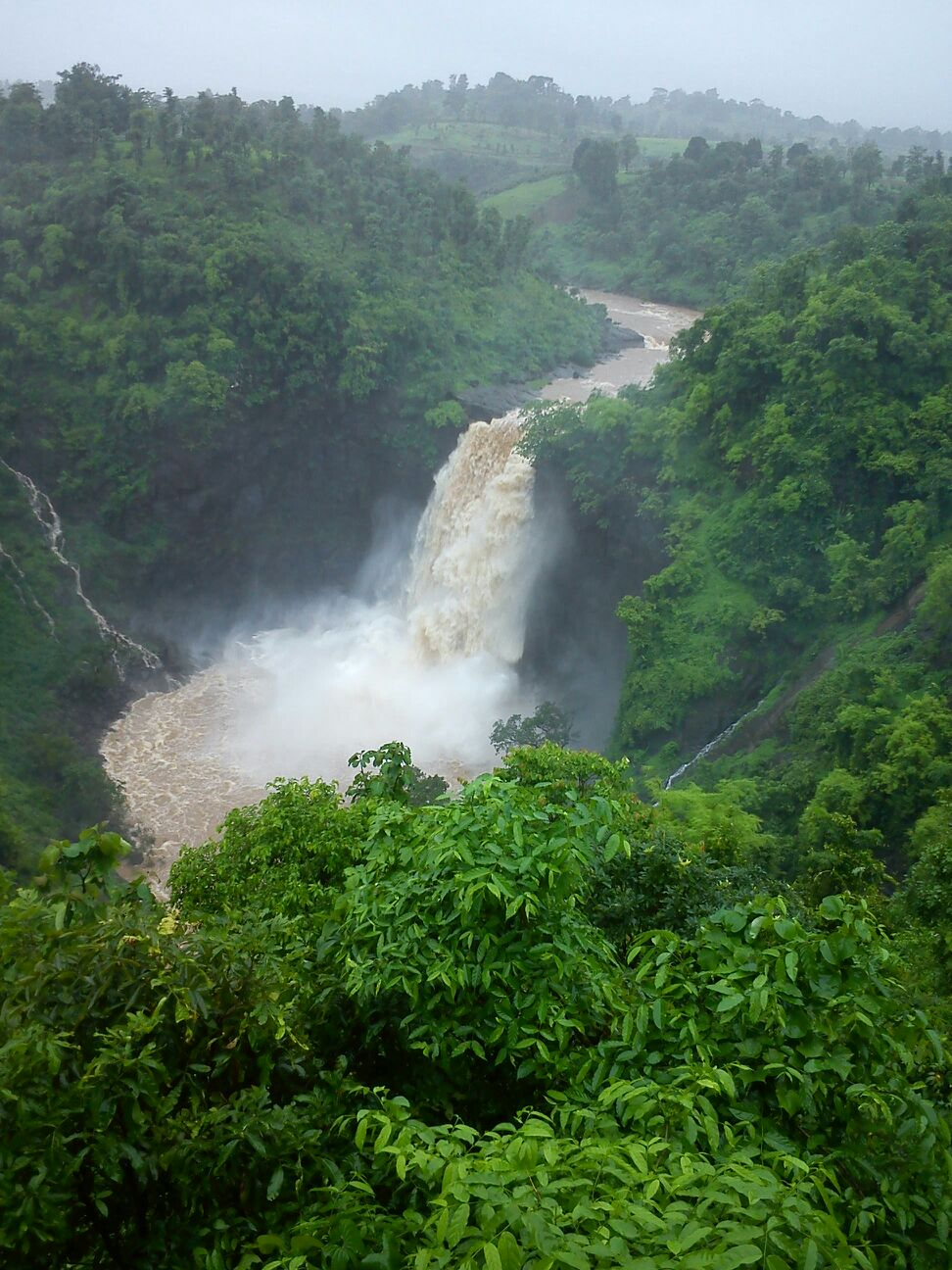
A scenic view of the Dahbosa Waterfalls during monsoon, Jawhar

Dabhosa- Dadarkopara -waterfall is only 18 km away from on Jawhar — Talasari — Silvasa Road. This waterfall is on Lendi river and on other side of river at Sarsun there is Dadarkopara Waterfall. The Dadarkopara fall usually gets dry during summer, therefore is also known as Suka (Dry) fall. The height of waterfall is about 300 feet. The water from Lendi river first flows in the flask shaped rock and from there it flows in 5 feet by 5 feet flask shaped open natural container made of rocks. The waterfalls are surround by straight mountains of height not less than 600 feet on both sides and are covered with medicinal plants.

=== Kal Mandavi Waterfall ===
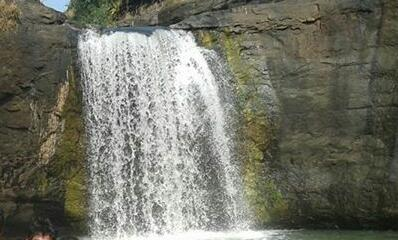
Kalmandvi Waterfall

The Kal Mandavi waterfall is about 100 meters in height and it flows throughout the year, and not just during the monsoons season. However, the most scenic views of the waterfall are during monsoon season. Jawhar to Kalmandi is approximately 5–6 km via Jawhar-Pawarpada-Zap road.

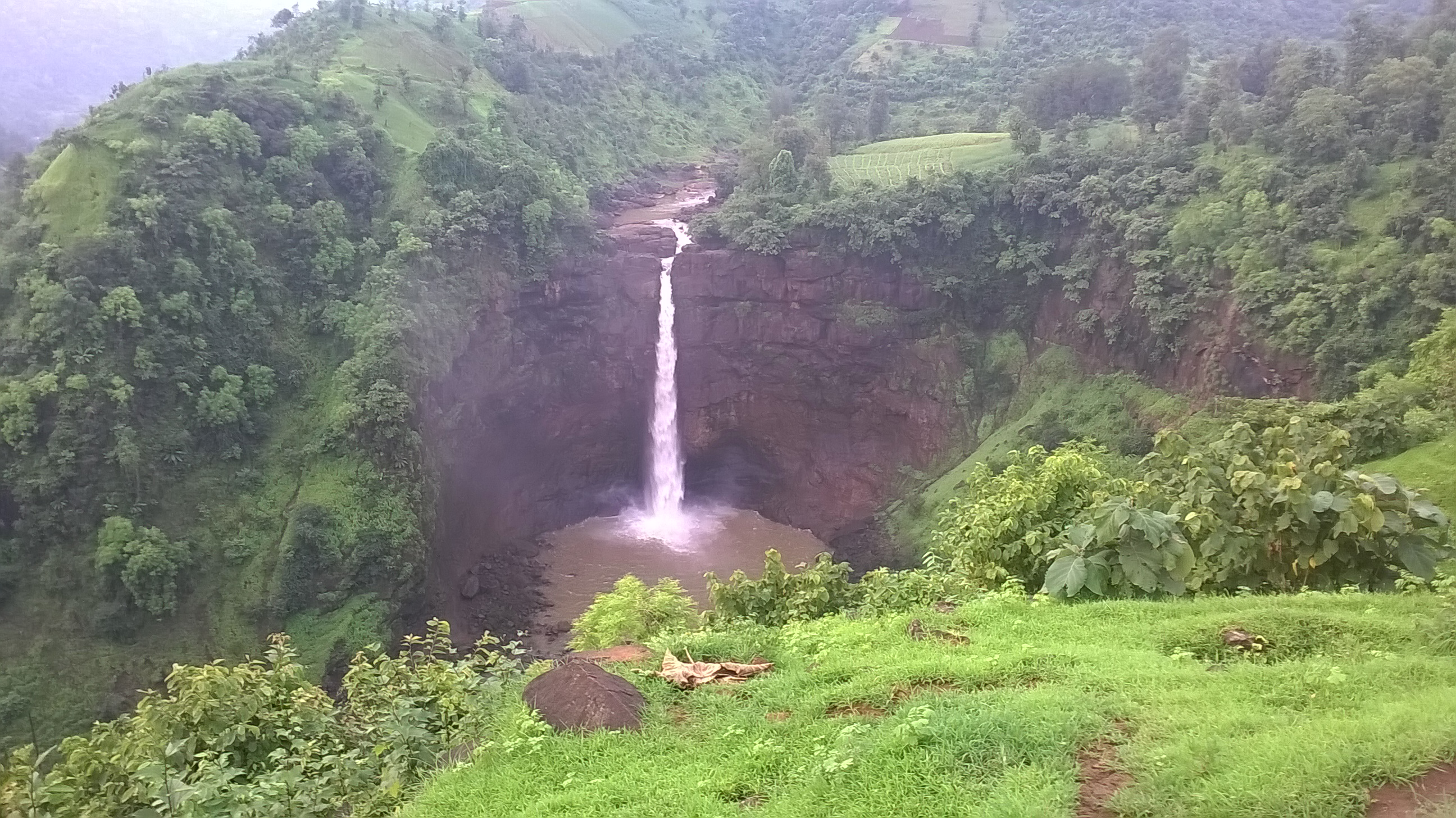
A waterfall near Dabhosa Waterfall, Jawhar

=== Khad-Khad Dam ===
This is one of the major dams near Jawhar city. The excess water of dam flows through the huge rocks (just ahead the dam) which can be seen in a form of a waterfall. Forest department is starting paddle boating through parivartan SHG recognised by ITDP.

=== Shirpamal ===
The Shirpamal is a place of historical importance. Chhatrapati Shivaji Maharaj had stayed here over-night, en route to plunder Surat. This point was developed by Advocate R.P. Mukne, President of Jawhar Municipal Council in 1995.

Hiradpada Waterfall

== Administration ==
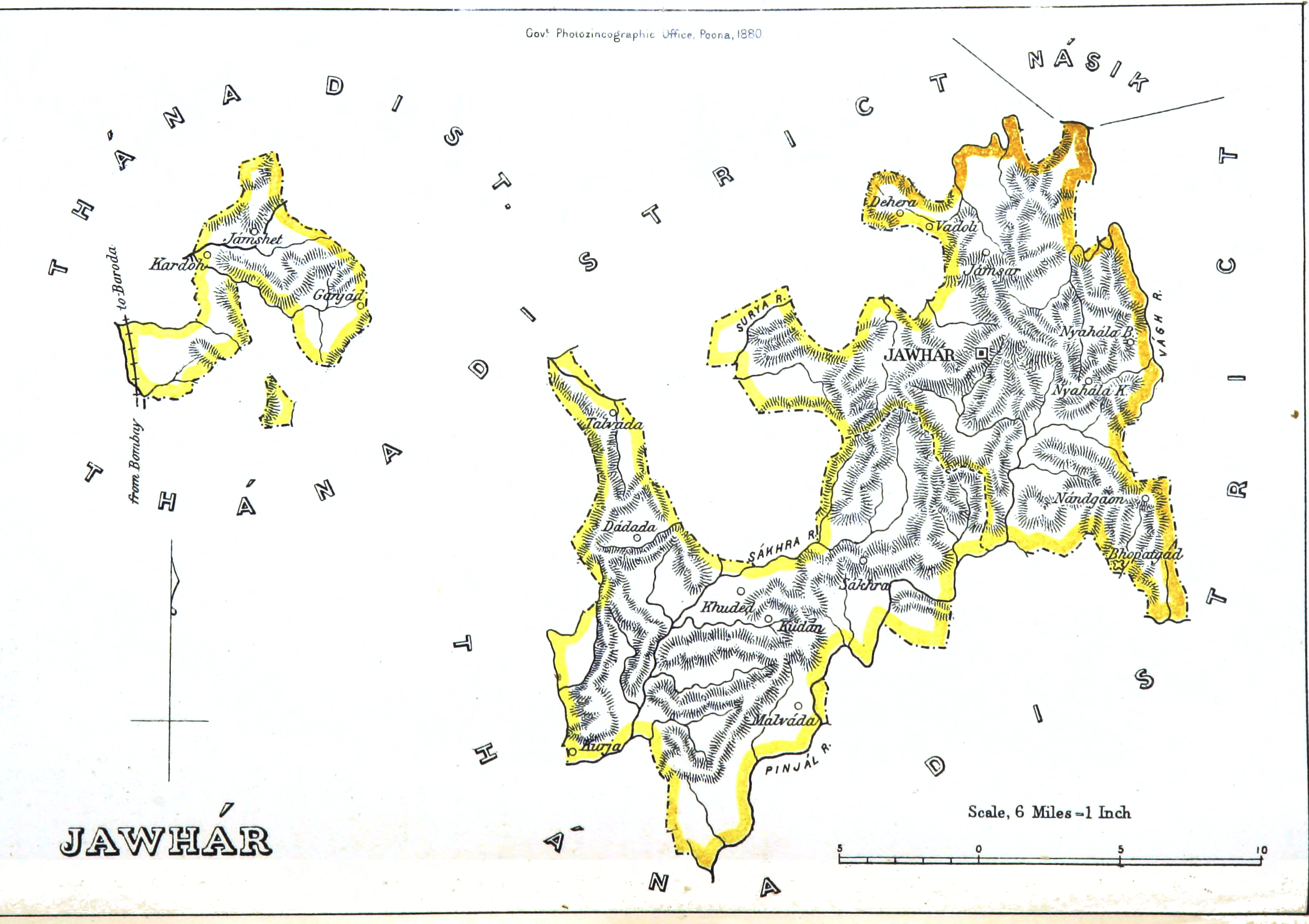
Map of the region/Jawhar Talukas map

Jawhar is an administrative headquarters of Jawhar Taluka.

Jawhar taluka Population of 2001
Town/Village Name	Population	Males	Females
Adkhadak	342	187	155
Aine	513	251	262
Akare	1,434	691	743
Akhar	705	330	375
Alyachimet	345	173	172
Anantnagar (N.V.)	742	385	357
Aptale	1,225	587	638
Ayare	1,132	560	572
Barawadpada	618	283	335
Behadgaon (N.V.)	1,227	597	630
Bhagada (N.V.)	430	207	223
Bharasatmet	464	223	241
Bhuritek	703	347	356
Bopdari	1,083	514	569
Borale	1,392	702	690
Chambharshet	1,674	829	845
Chandgaon (N.V.)	528	261	267
Chandranagar (N.V.)	246	119	127
Chandrapur (N.V.)	340	174	166
Chauk	1,152	575	577
Dabheri	1,825	938	887
Dabhlon	1,202	561	641
Dabhose	1,466	734	732
Dadar Koprapada	454	225	229
Dadhari	446	232	214
Dahul	216	111	105
Daskod	372	181	191
Dehare	1,666	901	765
Dengachimet	1,225	592	633
Devgaon	1,315	662	653
Dhanoshi	924	453	471
Dharampur	1,174	546	628
Dongarwadi	698	353	345
Ganeshnagar (N.V.)	1,005	505	500
Gangapur (N.V.)	172	78	94
Garadwadi	686	327	359
Ghiwande	1,649	805	844
Gorthan	778	394	384
Hade	818	419	399
Hateri	990	474	516
Hiradpada	1,487	756	731
Jambhulmaya (N.V.)	560	279	281
Jamsar	1,461	730	731
Jawhar	11,298	5,977	5,321
Jayeshwar (N.V.)	532	274	258
Juni Jawhar	1,460	704	756
Kadachimet	577	280	297
Kalamvihira	352	164	188
Kardhan	272	140	132
Kasatwadi	752	380	372
Kashivali Tarf Dengachimet	740	344	396
Kaulale	1,496	724	772
Kayari	725	347	378
Kelghar	1,029	499	530
Khadkhad	654	330	324
Khambale	1,198	672	526
Kharonda	1,891	937	954
Khidse	344	166	178
Kirmire	995	482	513
Kogade	613	310	303
Kortad	977	493	484
Kuturvihir	367	183	184
Malghar	664	325	339
Manmohadi	237	109	128
Medha	1,160	576	584
Medhe	245	115	130
Morchachapada	259	120	139
Nandgaon	1,757	935	822
Nandnmal	407	202	205
Nyahale Bk.	1,582	806	776
Nyahale Kh	2,000	1,051	949
Ozar	1,439	683	756
Palshin	181	93	88
Pathardi	1,369	685	684
Pimpalgaon	1,756	876	880
Pimpalshet	1,287	651	636
Pimprun	346	165	181
Poyshet	772	358	414
Radhanagari (N.V.)	330	156	174
Raitale	2,431	1,246	1,185
Rajewadi	987	473	514
Ramnagar (N.V.)	412	198	214
Ramnagar (N.V.)	391	201	190
Rampur (N.V.)	480	237	243
Ruighar	564	266	298
Sakharshet	1,852	926	926
Sakur	1,219	414	805
Sarsun	2,200	1,057	1,143
Savarpada	732	375	357
Shirasgaon (N.V.)	426	210	216
Shiroshi	807	387	420
Shivaji Nagar	912	455	457
Shivajinagar (N.V.)	338	162	176
Shrirampur	1,307	647	660
Shrirampur (N.V.)	419	208	211
Suryanagar (N.V.)	503	246	257
Suryanagar (N.V.)	425	203	222
Talasari	903	434	469
Tilonde	1,337	632	705
Tuljapur (N.V.)	400	188	212
Umbarkheda	670	332	338
Vangani	1,021	537	484
Vavar	1,833	959	874
Vijaynagar (N.V.)	1,077	514	563
Wadoli	975	472	503
Walwande	1,427	696	731
Winwal	2,127	1,140	987
Zap	1,917	1,089	828
Total	111,039	55,467	55,572

The sex ratio is greater in Jawhar because of most of male migrate for employment during some periods.

== In popular culture ==
- In the film Great Grand Masti, the Jaivilas Palace was shown as an ancestral haveli of one of the lead characters.
- The song "Mast Malanga" from Marathi movie One Way Ticket was shot at the Jaivilas Palace.
- This palace featured as the Haunted Haveli in Varun Thakur's web series Shaitan Haveli.

== Notable people ==
- Jayabha Mukne, founder of the Jawhar State
- Yashwantrao Martandrao Mukne, the last Maharaja of the Jawhar State
- Yamunabai Savarkar
- भिकल्या लाडक्या धिंडा
