= Yashwantrao Martandrao Mukne =

H.H. Yashwantrao M Mukne

Member of parliament, Lok Sabha
- In office 1952–1957
- Constituency: Thane

M P from Thane & Dahanu
- In office 1962–1971

Personal details
- Born: Jawhar
- Party: INC
- Children: 1 son, 2 daughters
- As of 24 February, 2012

H. H. Yashwantrao Martandrao Mukne (b 11 Dec 1917, Jawhar) was a member of the 4th Lok Sabha of India from the Dahanu constituency of Maharashtra and a member of the Indian National Congress (INC) political party.

He was also member of 1st Lok Sabha from Thane(ST) and 3rd Lok Sabha from Bhiwandi. He was former of Jawhar State in Maharashtra.

He had educated at Rajkumar College, Rajkot, Old Blundells School, England and at the Middle Temple, England. He was married to Her Highness Priyamvada Raje and had 1 son and 2 daughters and resides at Jaivilas Palace, Jawhar in Thane district.
