= Peint =

Peth Peint
- Town
- Location in Maharashtra, India
- Coordinates: 20°15′30.41″N 73°30′10.99″E
- Country: India
- State: Maharashtra
- District: Nashik

Languages
  - Official: Marathi
- Time zone: UTC+5:30 (IST)
- Postal code: 422208
- Vehicle registration: MH15

Peth or Peint is the smallest tehsil of Nashik subdivision of Nashik district in Maharashtra, India. It belongs to Northern Maharashtra region. It belongs to Nashik Division. Peth is a Taluka headquarter. It is located 54 km to the West of Nashik District headquarters. It is also called as Peint. Pin code of Peth is 422208 and postal head office is Peth.

== Location ==
Latitude: 20°15'29.9"N

Longitude: 73°30'11.3"E

Mean Height from sea level: 700m

== Regional setting ==
Peth (or Peint) is a town in Peth Taluka in Nashik District of Maharashtra, India. It belongs to Northern Maharashtra region. It belongs to Nashik Division. It is located 52 km towards North west from District headquarters Nashik. It is a Taluka headquarter. Peth tahsil is located at the Maharashtra state and Gujarat state boundary. This is one of the tribal tahsil of Maharashtra. Kokana Tribe is the major tribe in this tahsil.

Pin code peth is 422208 having postal head office at peth itself.

=== Nearby villages ===
Karanjali (10 km) Savalghat (2 km), Kumbharbari (3 km), Mangone (3 km), Gangodbari (3 km), Kotambi (4 km) are the nearby villages to Peth. The list of villages is hyperlinked to - List of Villages in Peint Taluka

=== Surrounding talukas ===
Dindori Taluka to the east, Trimbak Taluka to the south, Surgana Taluka to the north, and Nashik Taluka to the south surround Peth.

=== Nearby cities ===
Nearby cities to Peth are Nashik (52 km) and Ozar (67 km) to the south east, Dharampur (72 km) to the north west, Silvassa (70 km) to the west.

=== How to Reach Peth ===
By Rail: There is no railway station near to Peth in less than 50 km. Nasik Road Railway Station (near to Nashik) is the nearby the Railway station ( approximately 64 km.) reachable from nearby towns.

By Road: Nashik, Ozar, Dharampur, Silvassa are the nearby towns having road connectivity to Peth.

== History ==
Peth is present in the Nashik district at present. The territory now included in Nasik district was formerly partly in Khandesh district and partly in Ahmednagar district. In 1837–38 part of Ahmednagar district consisting of Sinnar, Chandor, Dindori, Nashik including Igatpuri and Peint State were made into a sub-collectorate under Ahmednagar. The sub-collectorate of Nashik was, however, abolished in 1856 and its talukas incorporated in Ahmednagar district. In 1869, Nasik was made a full-fledged district, which included Peth state. Peth state became British territory and was made into a sub-division in 1878. There were no major changes in the district or taluka boundaries between 1901 & 1948. First Indian to hold the post of Collector was 36th Collector Mr. Kothawala who was ICS.

== Agriculture ==
[null Table] 1: Crops grown in Peth

RANK	First	Second	Third
CROP	Rice	Nachani	Fruits

The ranking of crops can be calculated by seeing the percentage of area occupied by a crop to the total cropped area. The ranking of crop show the tendency of farmer whether they are market oriented or traditional. In this method, that crop occupy the highest percentage of the total cultivated area, is chosen as first rank crop and after it, crops are taken in decreasing order.

Source: Golden Research Thoughts Volume-4, Issue-7, Jan-2015

== Demographic characteristics ==
Peth Village, with population of 6858 is Peth sub-district's the most populous village, located in Peth sub district of Nashik district in the state Maharashtra in India. Total geographical area of Peth village is 13 km^{2} and it is the fifth biggest village by area in the sub district. Population density of the village is 532 persons per km^{2}. Nearest town of the village is Nashik and distance from Peth village to Nashik is 55 km. The village has its own post office and the pin code of Peth village is 422208. Peth is the sub district headquarter and the distance from the village is 3 km. District headquarter of the village is Nashik, which is 55 km away. 4.09 square kilometer (32%) of the total village's area is covered by forest.

=== Caste Wise Population ===
[null Table] 2 Caste Wise Population Distribution

	Total	Male	Female
Schedule Caste	400	214	186
Schedule Tribe	2068	1084	984

39% of the whole population are from general caste, 5% are from schedule caste and 57% are schedule tribes.

=== Literacy Rate ===
Total 5089 people in the village are literate, among them 2789 are male and 2300 are female. Literacy rate (children under 6 are excluded) of Peint is 85%. 90% of male and 79% of female population are literate here.

Change in Literacy Rate

	Total	Male	Female
Change	10.0%	7.9%	12.4%
2011	84.9%	90%	79.4%
2001	74.9%	82.1%	67%

(Source: Census of India, 2011 and Census of India, 2001)

=== Sex Ratio ===
As of 2011 census, sex ratio of Peth village is 935. Sex ratio in general caste is 955, in schedule caste is 832 and in schedule tribe is 931. There are 937 girls under 6 years of age per 1000 boys of the same age in the village. Overall sex ratio in the village has increased by 12 females per 1000 male during the years from 2001 to 2011. Child sex ratio here has decreased by 1 girls per 1000 boys during the same time.

Change in Sex Ratio

	Total	General	SC	ST	Child
Change	12	13	-62	18	-1
2011	935	955	832	931	937
2001	923	942	894	913	938

(Source: Census of India, 2011 and Census of India, 2001)

=== Working Population ===
[null Table] 6 Classification of Working Population

	Total	Male	Female
Total Workers	2543	1729	814
Main Workers	1987	1469	518
Cultivators	183	112	71
Agriculture Laborer	617	336	281
Household Industries	57	32	25
Other Workers	1130	989	141
Marginal Workers	556	260	296
Non-Working	4315	1815	2500

(Source: Census of India, 2011)

In Peth, out of total population, 2453 were engaged in work activities. 81% of workers did Main Work (Employment or Earning more than 6 Months) while 19% were involved in Marginal activity providing livelihood for less than 6 months. 4315 were non-workers of which 1815 were males and 2500 were females.

== Climatology ==
The climate here is tropical. The summers are much rainier than the winters in Peth.

=== Temperature Variation ===
The average annual temperature is 24.2 °C. May is the warmest month of the year. The temperature in May averages 28.8 °C. The lowest average temperatures in the year occur in January, when it is around 20.0 °C. The variation in temperatures throughout the year is 8.8 °C.

[null Table] 9 Temperature Variation in Peth

Temp. (°C)	January	February	March	April	May	June	July	August	September	October	November	December
Avg.	20	21.3	24.8	27.5	28.8	27	24.7	24.3	24.4	24.7	22.6	20.7
Min.	12.4	13.5	17.3	20.8	23.1	22.9	21.9	21.4	20.7	19.1	15.6	13.1
Max.	27.6	29.2	32.3	34.3	34.6	31.2	27.6	27.3	28.1	30.4	29.7	28.3

=== Rainfall Variation ===
The average rainfall is 1823 mm. There is a difference of 705 mm of precipitation between the driest and wettest months i.e. July and January (and February).

[null Table] 10 Rainfall Variation in Peth

	Rainfall (mm)		Rainfall (mm)
January	0	July	705
February	0	August	503
March	1	September	293
April	6	October	74
May	18	November	19
June	202	December	2

(Source: en.climate-data.org)
