= Tourism in Maharashtra =

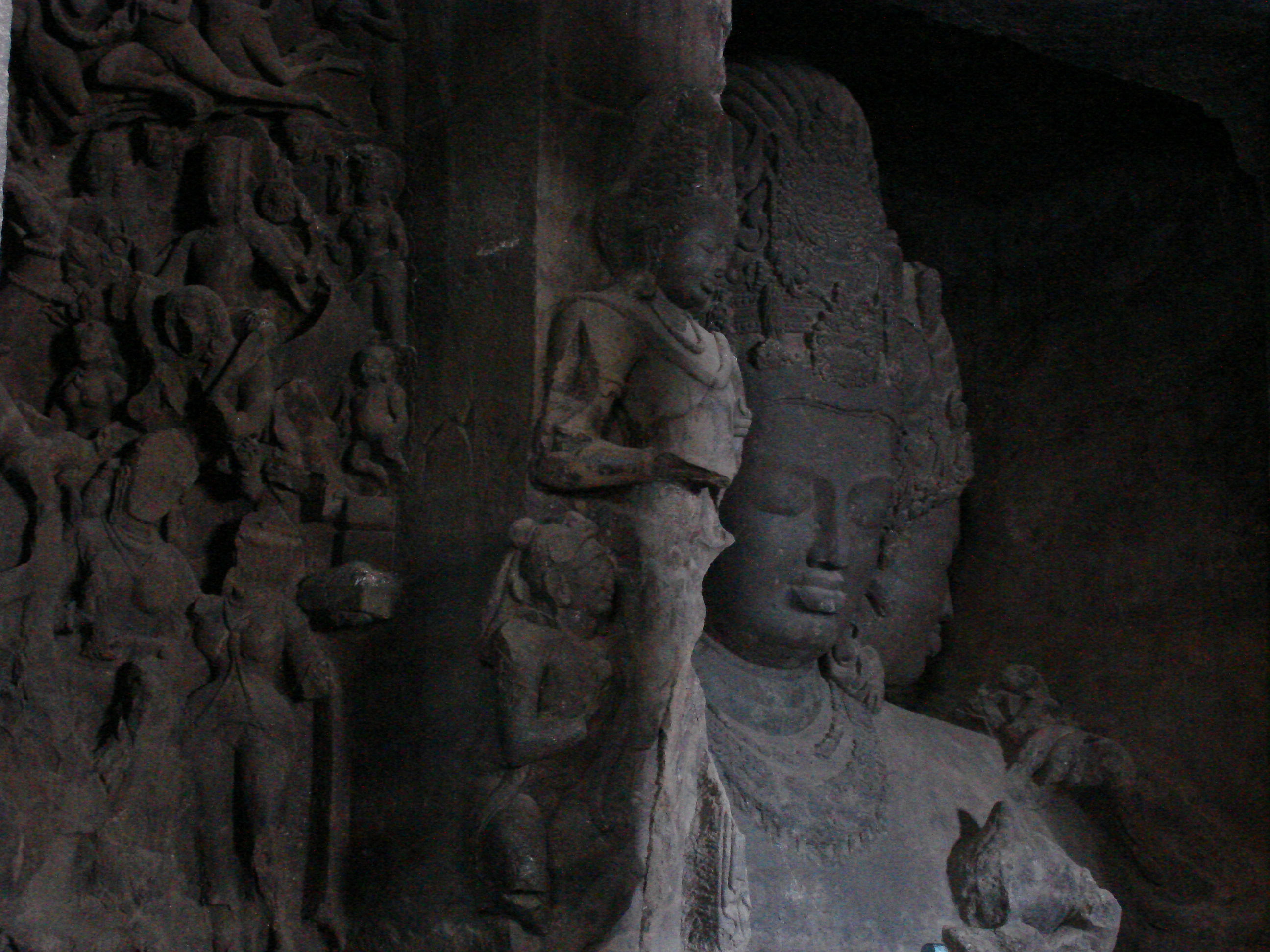
Trimurti statue in Elephanta Caves, a UNESCO World Heritage Site

Maharashtra attracts tourists from other Indian states and foreign countries. It was the second most visited Indian state by foreigners and fifth most visited state by domestic tourists in the country in 2021. Aurangabad is the tourism capital of Maharashtra.

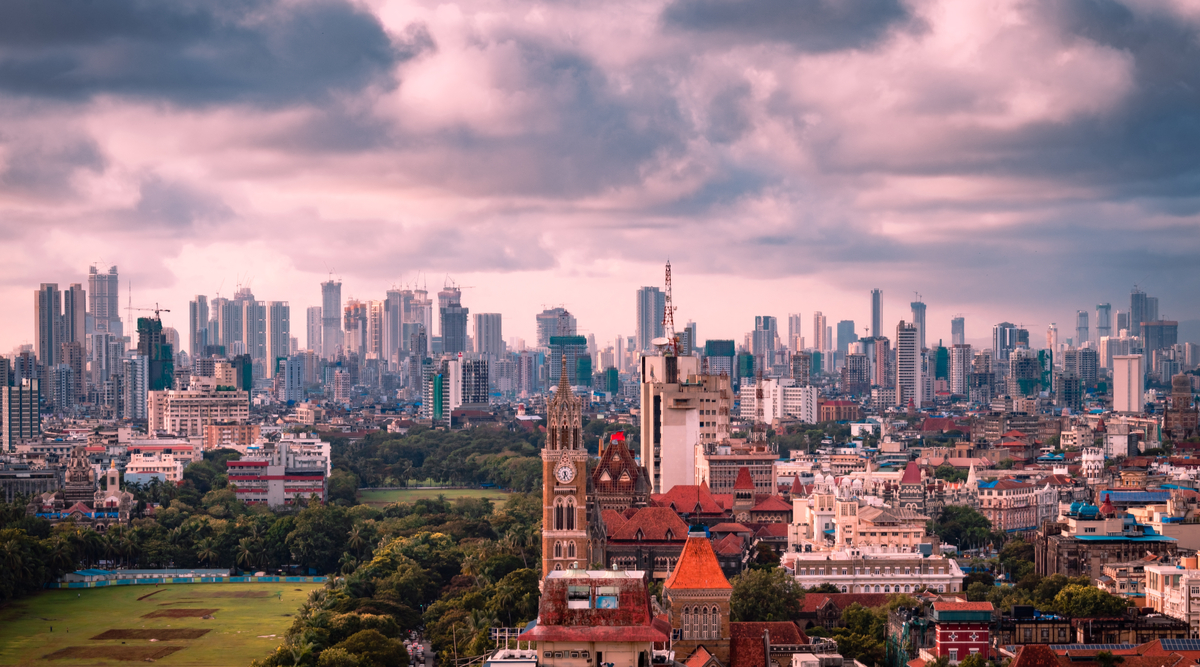
Mumbai Skyline

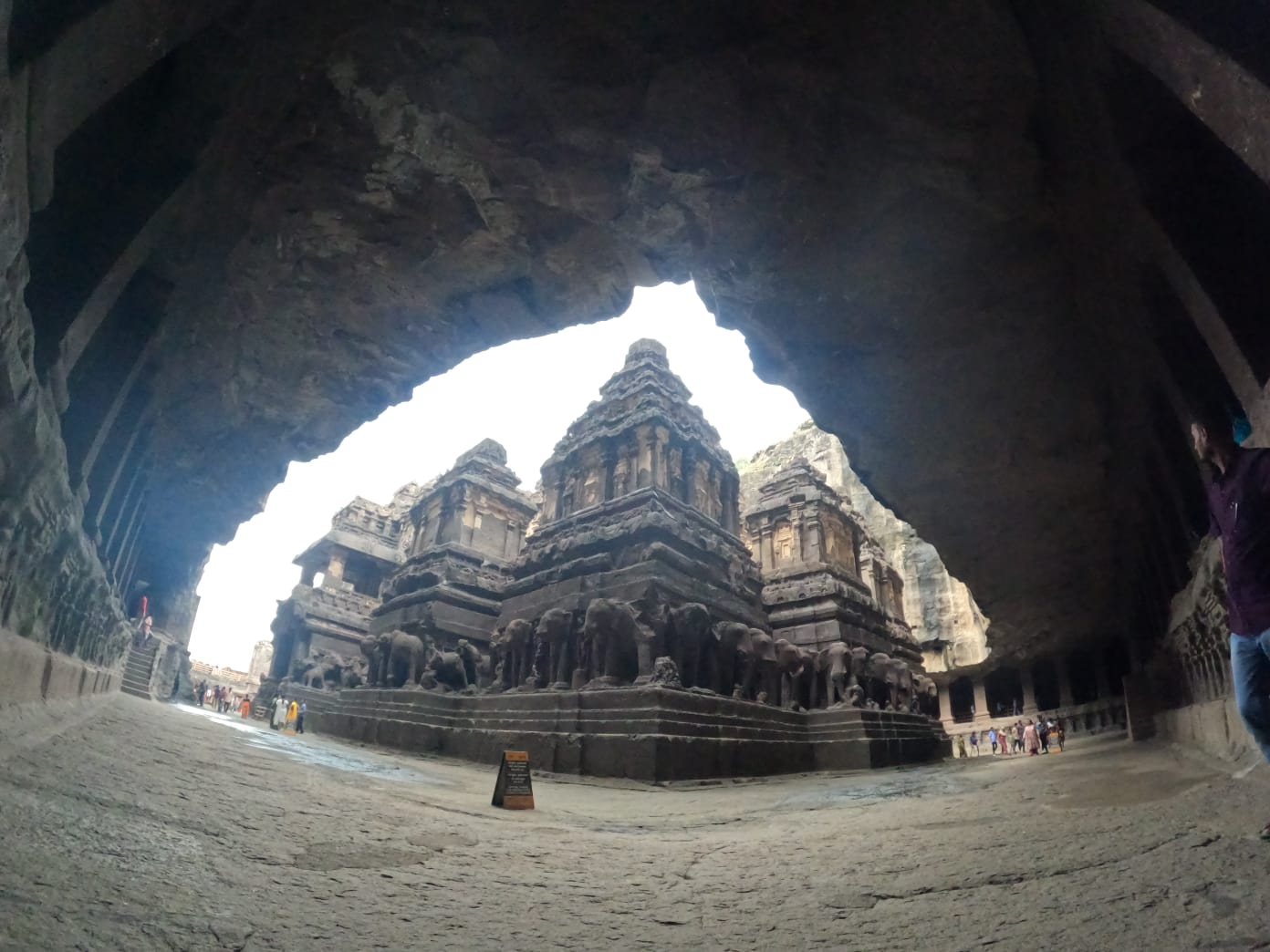
Kailasa Temple, Ellora Caves, a UNESCO World Heritage Site

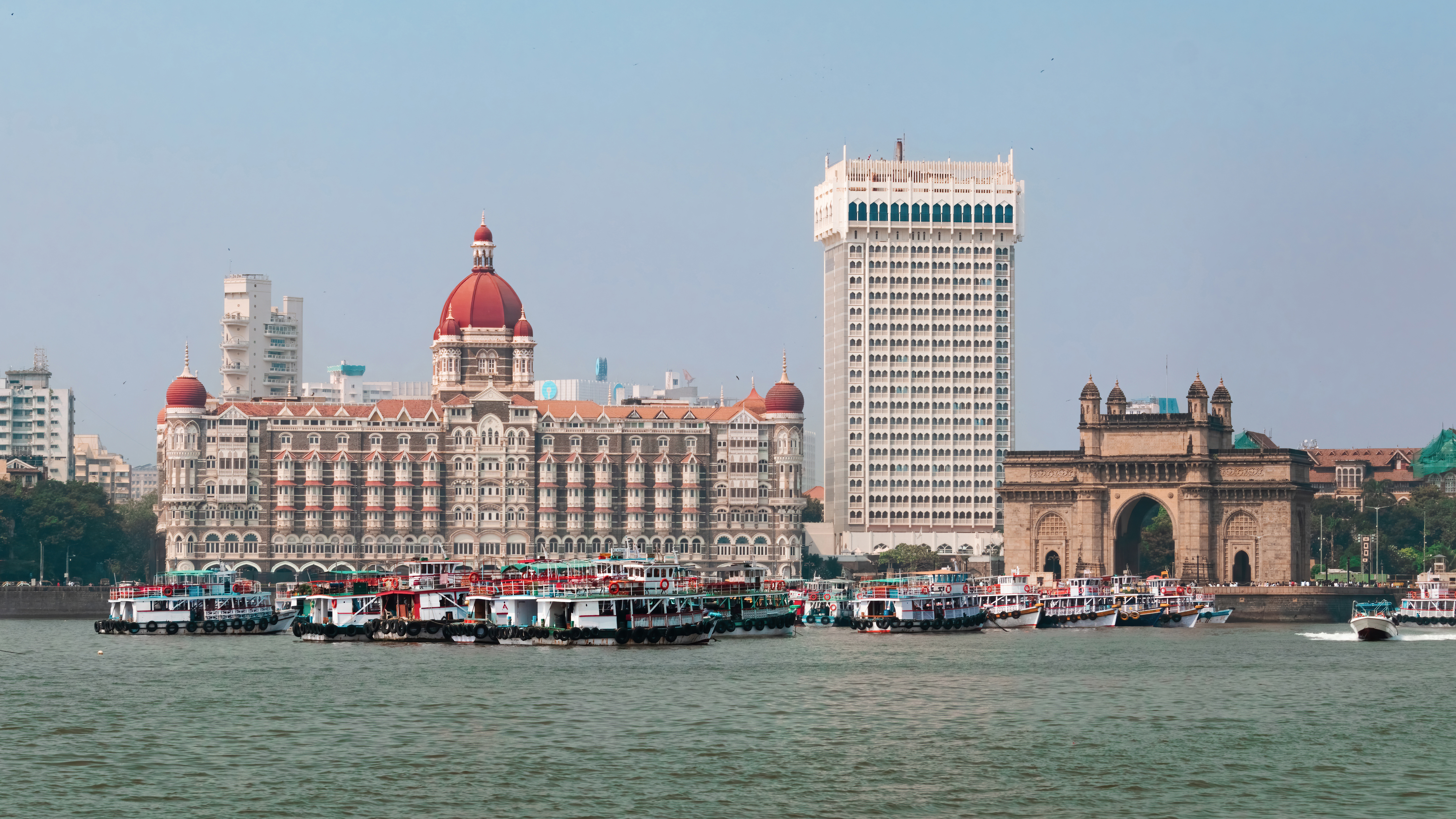
Gateway of India, Mumbai

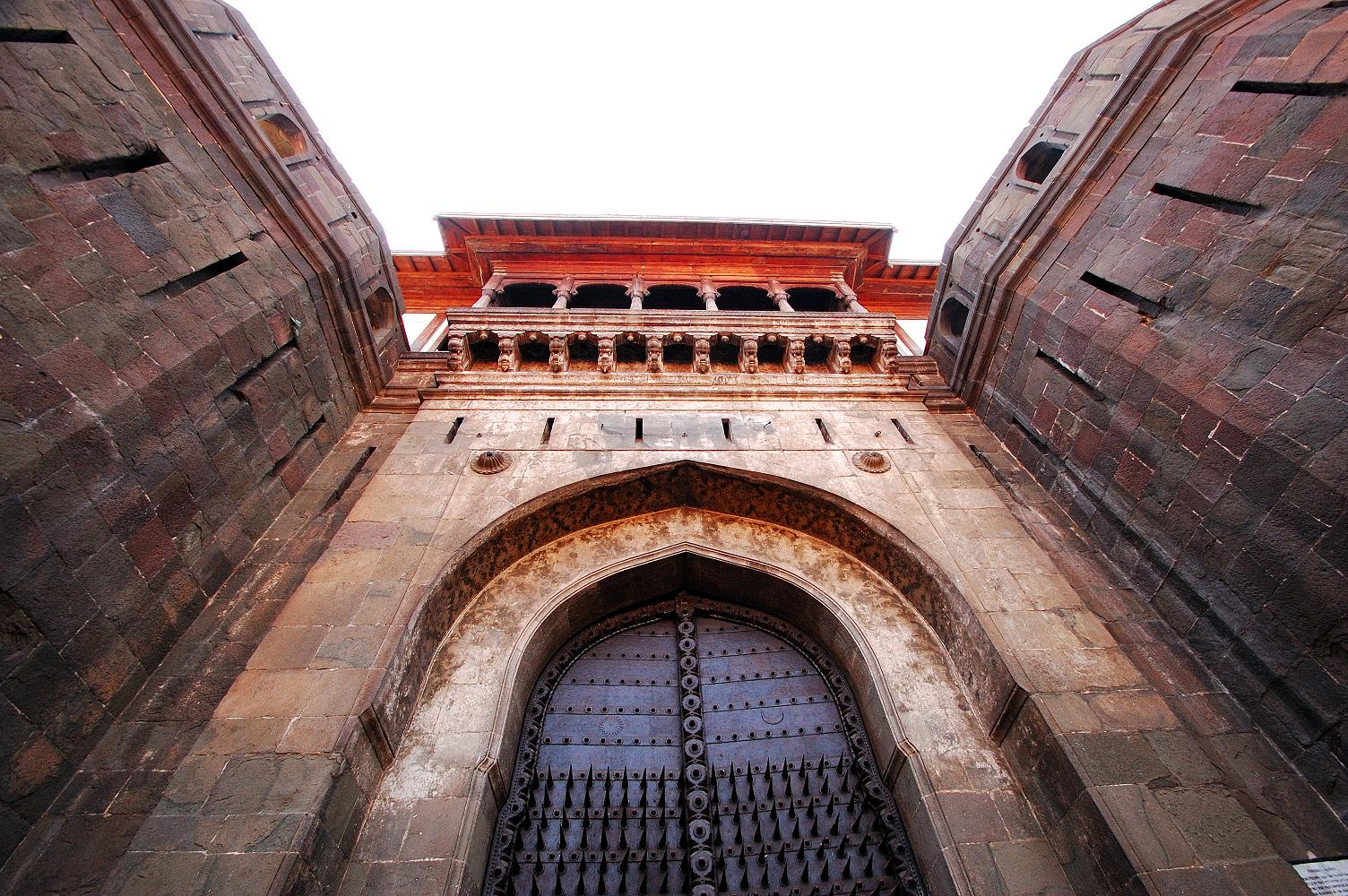
Shaniwar Wada, Pune

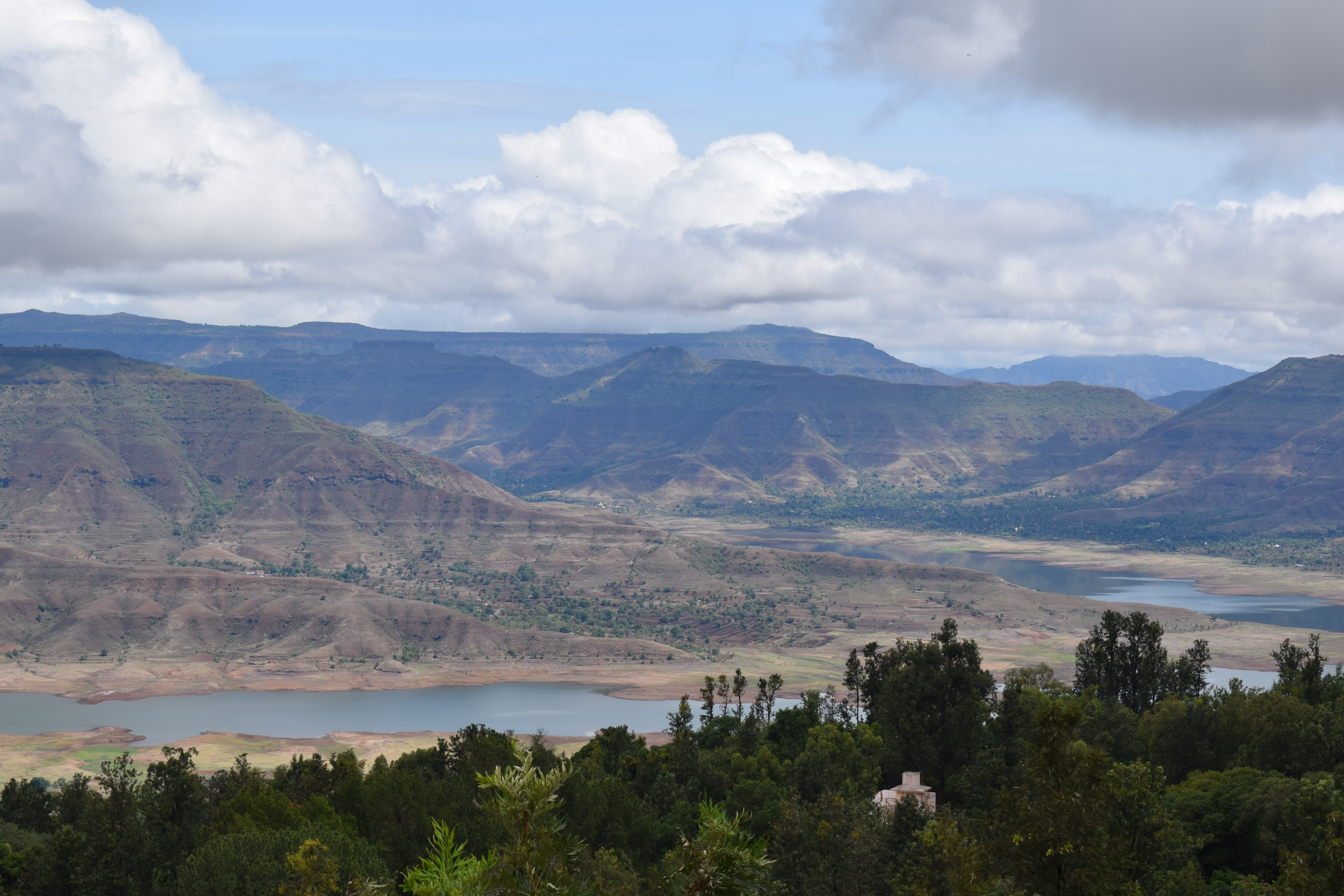
Mahabaleshwar Hill Station

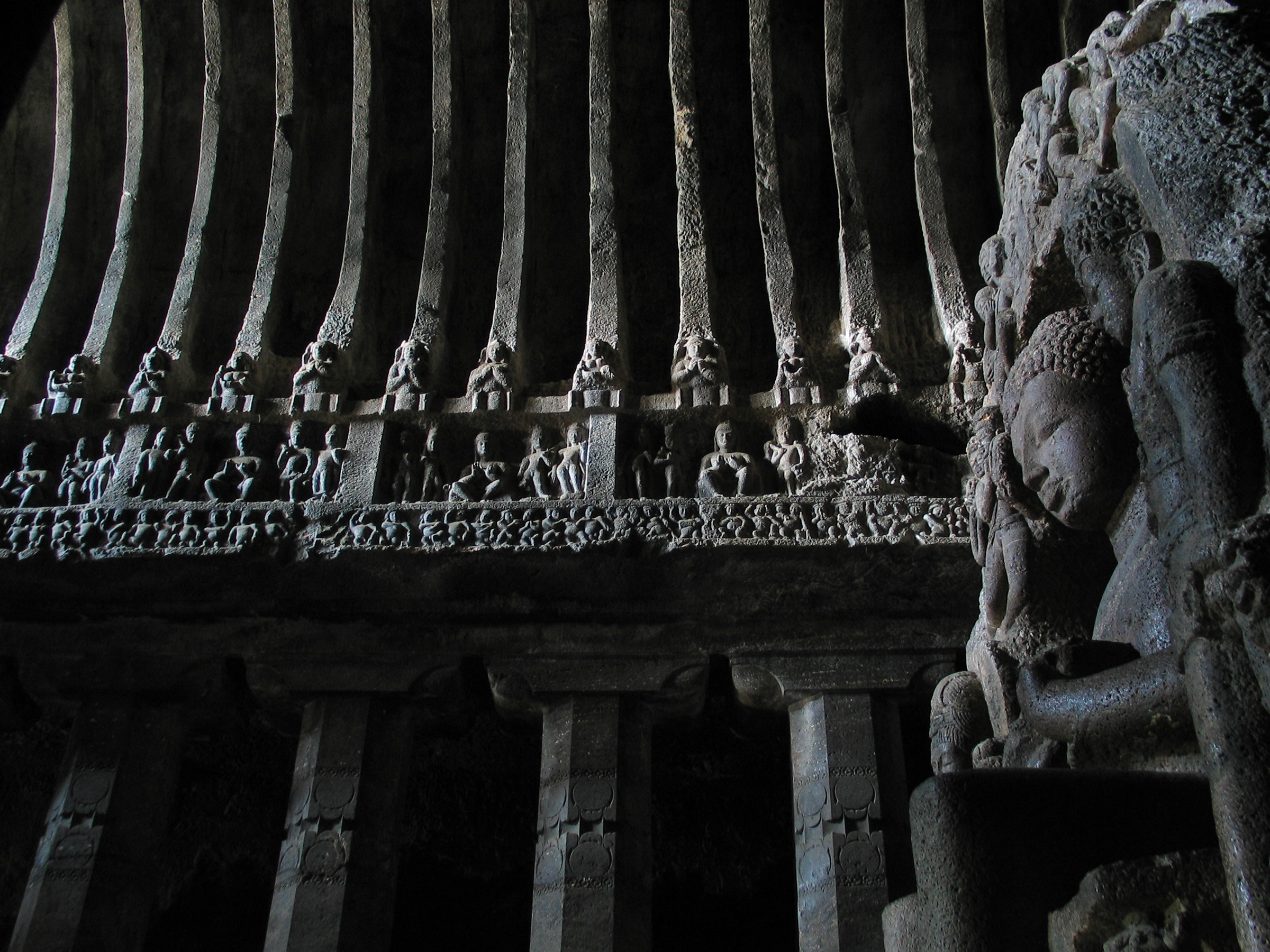
Ajanta Caves Temples, a UNESCO World Heritage Site

Maharashtra has a number of places that attract national and international tourists. The most popular or well known are the state capital, Mumbai, Ajanta, the Ellora Caves, and the Nature reserves in the state. Ajanta–Ellora are the UNESCO World Heritage Sites. Mumbai, being the biggest and the most cosmopolitan city in India, attracts tourists from all over the world for its many attractions, including colonial architecture, beaches, Bollywood, shopping, and an active nightlife. The city attracts three million foreign and forty million domestic tourists annually. The state wants to increase the numbers by allowing retailers and entertainment venues to be open 24-hours a day, seven days a week.

The city of Pune, in association with MTDC, organises many cultural events during Pune festival which coincides with the Hindu Ganeshotsav festival. Hill stations built during the British rule are popular tourist destinations, especially during the summer months. These include Mahabaleshwar, Lonavala, and Matheran in Western Maharashtra, and Chikhaldara in the Vidarbha region. The mountainous districts of Western Maharashtra are dotted with the ruins of hundreds of mountain forts from the Deccan Sultanates and the Maratha Empire eras. These forts and the surrounding hills are popular among people interested in trekking, and hiking, and heritage tourism related to Shivaji. Notable forts popular with tourists include Shivaneri, Rajgad, Sinhagad, Raigad, and Pratapgad.

A number of temples such as Trimbakeshwar, Bhavani of Tuljapur, Shani Shingnapur, Jyotiba Temple, Ashtavinayaka Ganapati temples, Lord Pandurang temple at Pandharpur attract a huge number of Hindu devotees every year. Khandoba temple of God Khandoba at Jejuri in the Pune district attract pilgrims from all over the Maharashtra where worshippers shower each other with Bhandar (turmeric powder). Saibaba temple at Shirdi is visited by an average of 25,000 pilgrims a day and during religious festivals, this number can reach up to 300,000. The places associated with the Warkari sect such as Pandharpur, Dehu, and Alandi remain popular throughout the year, and attract huge number of people from all over the state during religious observations. Situated in Nanded, Sikh Gurudwara of Hazur Sahib, also known as Takht Sachkhand Sri Hazur Abchalnagar Sahib, is one of the five takhts in Sikhism. The area around the city of Aurangabad has many ancient and medieval sites including the UNESCO World Heritage Sites of Ajanta and Ellora caves, the Daulatabad Fort, and the Bibi Ka Maqbara.

The Vidarbha region of Maharashtra has numerous nature reserve parks. These include Melghat Tiger Reserve in Amravati district, Tadoba-Andhari Tiger Reserve in Chandrapur district, Umred Karhandla Wildlife Sanctuary in Nagpur district, the Nagzira wildlife sanctuary, and Navegaon National Park (bird sanctuary) of Gondia District.

According to a survey by the government of Maharashtra, in 2009–10, domestic tourists accounted for 98% of the total number of visitors to Maharashtra and the remaining were foreign. Visitors from the US, UK, Germany, and UAE each form a significant percentage of the foreign tourists. The state government has established the Maharashtra Tourism Development Corporation (MTDC) for the systematic development and promotion of tourism in the state. MTDC owns and maintains resorts at all key tourist centres.

== Metropolitan areas ==
=== Mumbai ===
The city is the eastern equivalent of New York City and Los Angeles, the financial capital and entertainment (Bollywood) capital of the country. Places of interest include: Gateway of India, The Bandra–Worli Sea Link, Chhatrapati Shivaji Maharaj Vastu Sangrahalaya, Chhatrapati Shivaji Terminus, a humongous architectural stone structure built by the British more than 200 years ago, Downtown Mumbai - reminiscent of the 19th century British architecture. Girgaon Chowpatty beach, Madh Island beach and other beaches towards the south of Mumbai. Elephanta Caves, carved out of a giant stone on an island are a short ferry away into the Arabian Sea. Siddhivinayak Temple, Mumbai is one of the most popular temple of Ganesha in Mumbai. Along with being a religious place, it is a great attraction for tourists. Due to its cosmopolitan nature, Mumbai has proven a popular tourism destination most often visited by Indians.

=== Nashik ===
The city is famous for its Nashik grape and vineyards. It is known as "The Wine Capital of India" owing to 26 wineries being located here out of a total of 46 throughout India. Several wine festivals and wine tasting tours are held in this region. Nashik is also surrounded by various forts and hills and has an abundance of hiking trails.

Statue of Lord Rama, Nashik is tallest statue of Lord Rama in Maharshtra state. The statue is located in Ramshristi Udyan, Tapovan Panchavati. The statue was built under the leadership of Rahul Uttamrao Dhikale, member of the Legislative Assembly from Nashik East Constituency.

A 108 feet tall statue of the first Jain Tirthankar Rishabhanatha was consecrated at Mangi Tungi in 2016, which is the tallest Jain statue in the world. The place has now become a major pilgrimage and tourist destination in the state.

The city also has a lot of religious and mythological significance. Lord Rama lived in Panchavati during his exile as mentioned in the epic Ramayana. It is famous for its numerous temples like Kalaram Temple, Trimbakeshwar Temple - one of the 12 Jyotirlingas. The river Godavari River, also known as the Ganga of the South, originates from the Brahmagiri Hills in Trimbakeshwar. The Nasik-Trimbakeshwar Simhastha is one of the four Kumbh Melas held every 12 years in Nashik.

=== Pune ===
Pune district has been at the center of History of Maharashtra for more than 400 years, beginning with the Deccan sultanates and followed by the Maratha Empire. The district has a number of mountain forts and buildings from these eras, in addition to shrines revered by Marathi Hindus (including five of the eight Ashtavinayaka Ganesha temples). Samadhis of the two most revered Marathi Bhakti saints (Dnyaneshwar and Tukaram) are in Alandi and Dehu, respectively. The main temple of Khandoba, the family deity for most Marathi Hindus, is in Jejuri.

The British designated Pune as the monsoon capital of the Bombay Presidency, and many buildings and parks from the era remain. Hill stations such as Lonavala and Khandala also date back to the Raj, and remain popular with residents of Pune and Mumbai for holidays. The Western part of Pune district is dotted with the ruins of many mountain forts from Deccan Sultanate and the Maratha empire eras respectively. These forts and the surrounding hills with forests are popular with people interested in trekking, hiking and heritage tourism.

Bhigwan, a catchment area of the Ujjani Dam, is about from Pune on NH 9, the Pune-Solapur highway. An area of about 18,000 hectares (69 sq mi) has become a sanctuary for migratory birds.

In January 2021, the prison department of Maharashtra announced jail tourism at the Yerawada jail where Indian independence activists like M. K Gandhi, Bal Gangadhar Tilak, Vallabhbhai Patel, Subhas Chandra Bose, Sarojini Naidu, Jawaharlal Nehru were imprisoned. The visitor numbers to the prison will initially be capped at 50 per day.

=== Chhatrapati Sambhaji Nagar ===
This city is also known as Aurangabad, in the central part of Maharashtra and attracts tourists for its natural beauty. The Ajanta Caves and Ellora Caves, that lie on the outskirts of Aurangabad are internationally renowned for man-made caves and intricate carvings in them. Ajanta and Ellora Caves are UNESCO World Heritage sites. Ellora is notable for having a unique monolithic vertically excavated building known as Kailasa Temple, Ellora and Ajanta Caves is notably for Lord Buddha in stone. Ancient Buddhist life has been depicted in the delicate stonework. While Ajanta is completely Buddhist caves, Ellora caves belong to Buddhism, Hinduism, and Jainism. Summers are not advisable for touring as temperatures can reach up to and above 44 degrees C during the day. There are other famous places of interest like Bibi Ka Maqbara (The Taj Mahal of Deccan), Daulatabad Fort, Panchakki, Sunheri Mahal, etc. Aurangabad has good connectivity by air, road, and railways.

Aurangabad is the tourism capital of Maharashtra.

=== Nagpur ===
With a tradition of producing the best oranges, Nagpur city is known as the City of Oranges. Nagpur is also known as the second greenest city in India due to a number of trees in the city. The tourism in Nagpur is due to a large number of National Parks/Wildlife Sanctuaries surrounding Nagpur. All of these sanctuaries have Tiger as their major attractions. Two notable National Parks around Nagpur are Pench National Park around 60 km north of Nagpur, and Tadoba National Park around 180 km south of Nagpur. In recent years, Tadoba National Park gained much importance among wildlife enthusiasts nationally and internationally due to the high probability of sighting Tigers. The other wildlife sanctuaries include Nagzira Wildlife Sanctuary around 110 km east of Nagpur, Melghat Tiger Reserve around 260 km west of Nagpur, Umred Karhandla Wildlife Sanctuary 60 km southeast of Nagpur, Bor Wildlife Sanctuary 60 km southwest of Nagpur, Kanha National Park 260 km northeast of Nagpur, Satpura National Park 270 km northwest of Nagpur.

Beside these Nagpur has much historical significance. Deekshabhoomi - the place where Dr. Babasaheb Ambedkar and lakhs of the so-called lower caste who deemed as untouchables by Hindu caste system, embraced Buddhism. Another important place to visit is Tekadi Ganesh mandir on Sitabuildi fort complex. The city has other places of tourist importance such as Maharajbagh zoo, and Futala lake Chowpati, Nagpur is well connected with all major cities of India by roadways and railways, and also have an international airport. Dr. Babasaheb Ambedkar International Airport (IATA: NAG, ICAO: VANP) is an international airport serving the city of Nagpur, Maharashtra, India. In 2005, it was named after B. R. Ambedkar, the chief architect of the Indian Constitution.

=== Satara ===
Satara lies on the western part of Maharashtra. It is known for tourist places like Mahabaleshwar, Wai, Panchgani and rivers such as Koyna and Krishna. Mahabaleshwar and Panchgani are one of the famous tourist places in India. The Krishna River originates at Mahabaleswar near the Jor village in the extreme north of Wai district. The Kaas plateau is also one of the most popular tourist attractions in Satara. This plateau falls under the Sahyadri Sub Cluster of Western Ghats which is now a UNESCO World Heritage Site.

== Nature tourism ==
Maharashtra has tremendous potential for nature tourism. Many private and public organizations have begun unique and innovative forms of nature tourism.

=== Hill stations ===
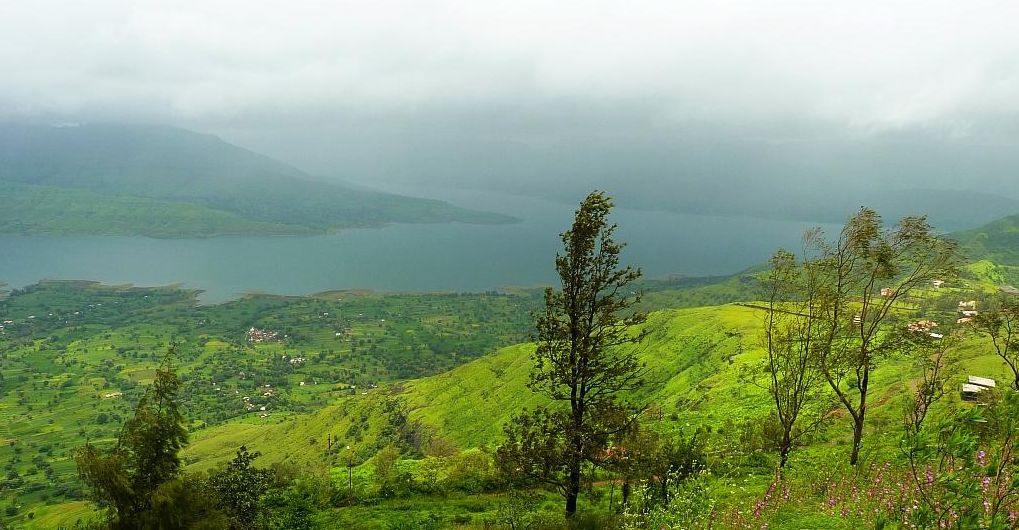
View from Sydney Point, Panchgani in monsoon

During the colonial rule, the British developed many hill stations throughout India and in Maharashtra to escape the heat during the summer months. Most of these are located on the hills of the Sahyadri range of the Western Ghats and close to the largest metropolitan areas in state, namely Mumbai and Pune. Chikhaldara and Toranmal are two places that are located on the Satpura Range which runs east to west on the border between Maharashtra and Madhya Pradesh. Popular colonial era hill stations in the state include

- Amboli
- Chikhaldara - in Satpura mountains
- Igatpuri - On main Mumbai–Bhusawal railway line
- Jawhar
- Karjat - On main Mumbai–Pune railway line
- Khandala - On main Mumbai–Pune railway line
- Lonavala - On main Mumbai–Pune railway line
- Mahabaleshwar - Summer capital of Bombay Presidency during the British Raj
- Matheran - linked to the main Mumbai–Pune railway line with a narrow-gauge mountain train.
- Panchgani - Close neighbour of Mahabaleshwar with many colonial-era boarding schools.
- Panhala
- Toranmal

Lavasa is a very recently developed township and is under private control.

== Religious Tourism ==
Maharashtra boasts of a large number of popular and revered religious venues that are heavily frequented by locals as well as out-of-state visitors.

=== Hindu places of pilgrimage ===
A number of temples such as Bhimashankar, Trimbakeshwar, Bhavani of Tuljapur, Shani Shingnapur, Jyotiba Temple, Ashtavinayaka Ganapati temples, Lord Pandurang temple at Pandharpur attract a huge number of Hindu devotees every year. Khandoba temple of God Khandoba at Jejuri in the Pune district attract pilgrims from all over the Maharashtra where worshipers shower each other with Bhandar (turmeric powder).< Saibaba temple at Shirdi is visited by an average of 25,000 pilgrims a day and during religious festivals, this number can reach up to 300,000.

- Vithoba Temple, Pandharpur, is the main center of worship for the Hindu deity Vithoba, believed to be a local form of god Krishna or Vishnu and his consort Rakhumai. Vithoba devotees called Varkaris start marching from the resting places of Varkari saints from different regions of Maharashtra but mainly from Dehu, and Alandi to Pandharpur in huge processions to reach Pandharpur on Aashadhi ekadashi and Kartiki Ekadashi.Pandharpur and other places associated with the Warkari sect such as Sant Tukaram memorial at Dehu, and Samadhi of Sant Dnyaneshwar at Alandi remain popular throughout the year, and attract huge number of people from all over the state during religious observations.

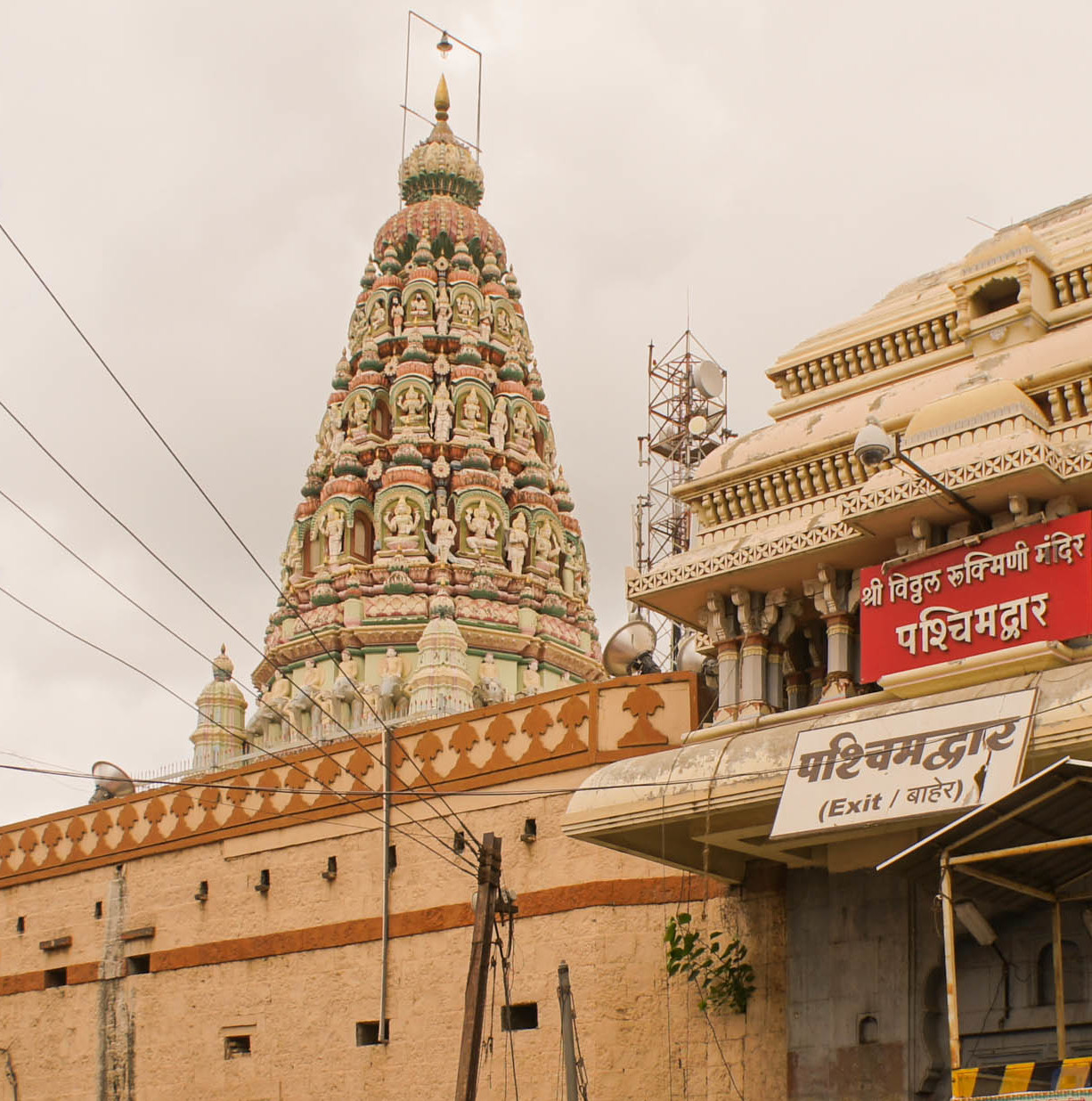
Vitthal Rukmini temple

Marathi Hindu families have a family deity called Kuldevta that they visit after many auspicious events. Important ancient Kuldevta temples that attract pilgrims in the state include:

- Renukadevi at Mahur, considered a Shakta pitha, is located in the Nanded district.
- Tuljapur-Temple of Goddess Bhavani
- Kolhapur -Temple of Goddess Mahalaxmi or Ambabai
- Ambajogai -Temple of Yogeshwari, one of the 3 1/2 Shakta pithas in the state.
- Jejuri - Temple of Khandoba

Many temples or shrines of 19th and 20th century saints are very popular with pilgrims. The important ones include:

- Shegaon, resting place of Gajanan Maharaj, the late 19th/early 20th-century religious figure
- Akkalkot, Temple /Matha dedicated to 19th century Swami Samarth.
- Shirdi, temple of Sai Baba - a hugely revered saint from late 19th/early 20th century with global following.
- Gondavale, samadhi of Gondavlekar Maharaj

Other places popular with devotees and pilgrims include:

- Mumbai, Temple of Siddhivinayak Temple, Mumbai
- Mumbai, Mahalakshmi temple in south Mumbai
- Shani Shingnapur, Temple of God Shani (Shanidev)
- Ashtavinayaka, 8 Abodes of Lord Ganesha
- Trimbakeshwar

=== Other religions and sects ===
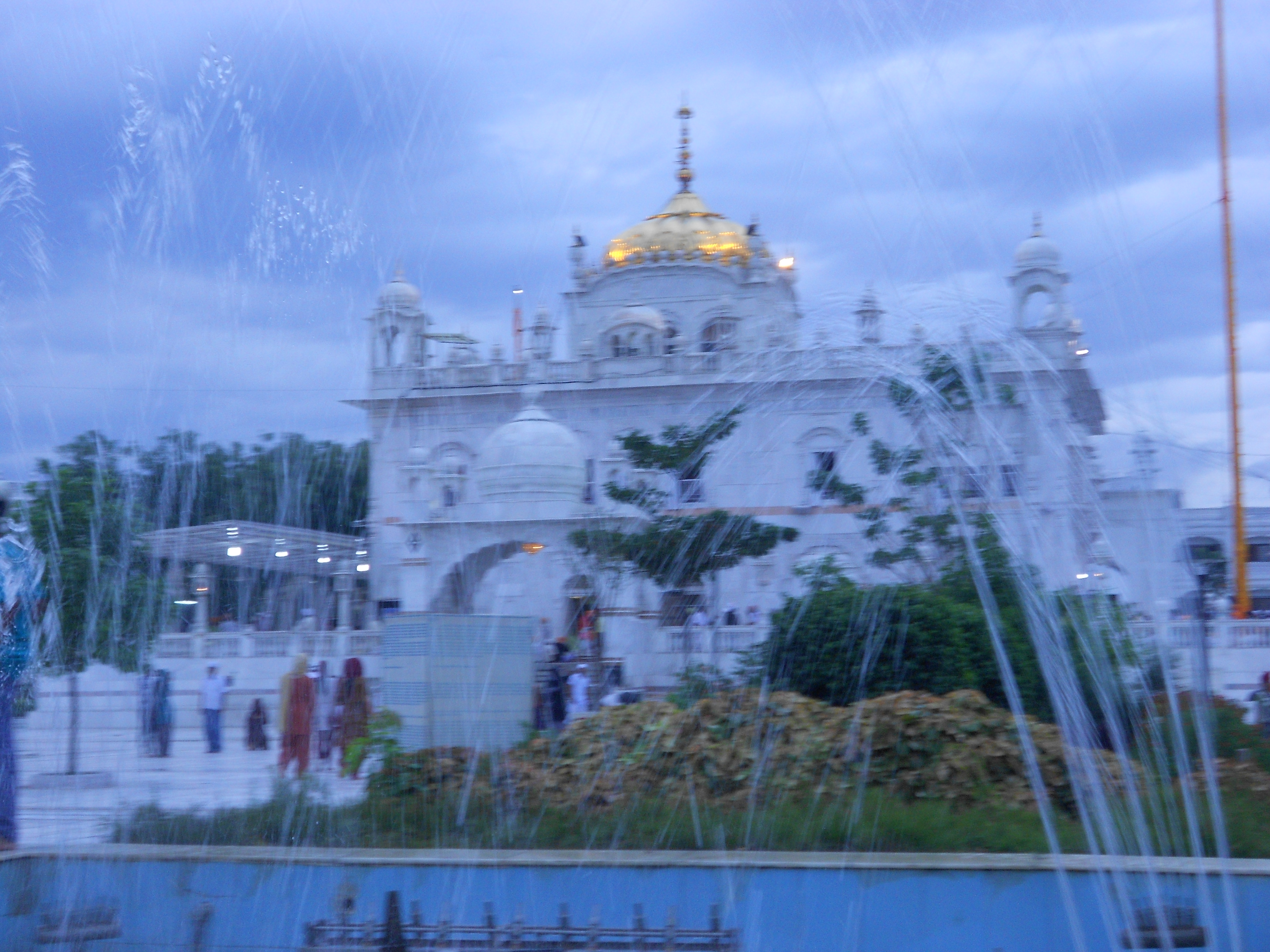
Hazur Sahib Nanded is one of the holiest place in Sikhism.

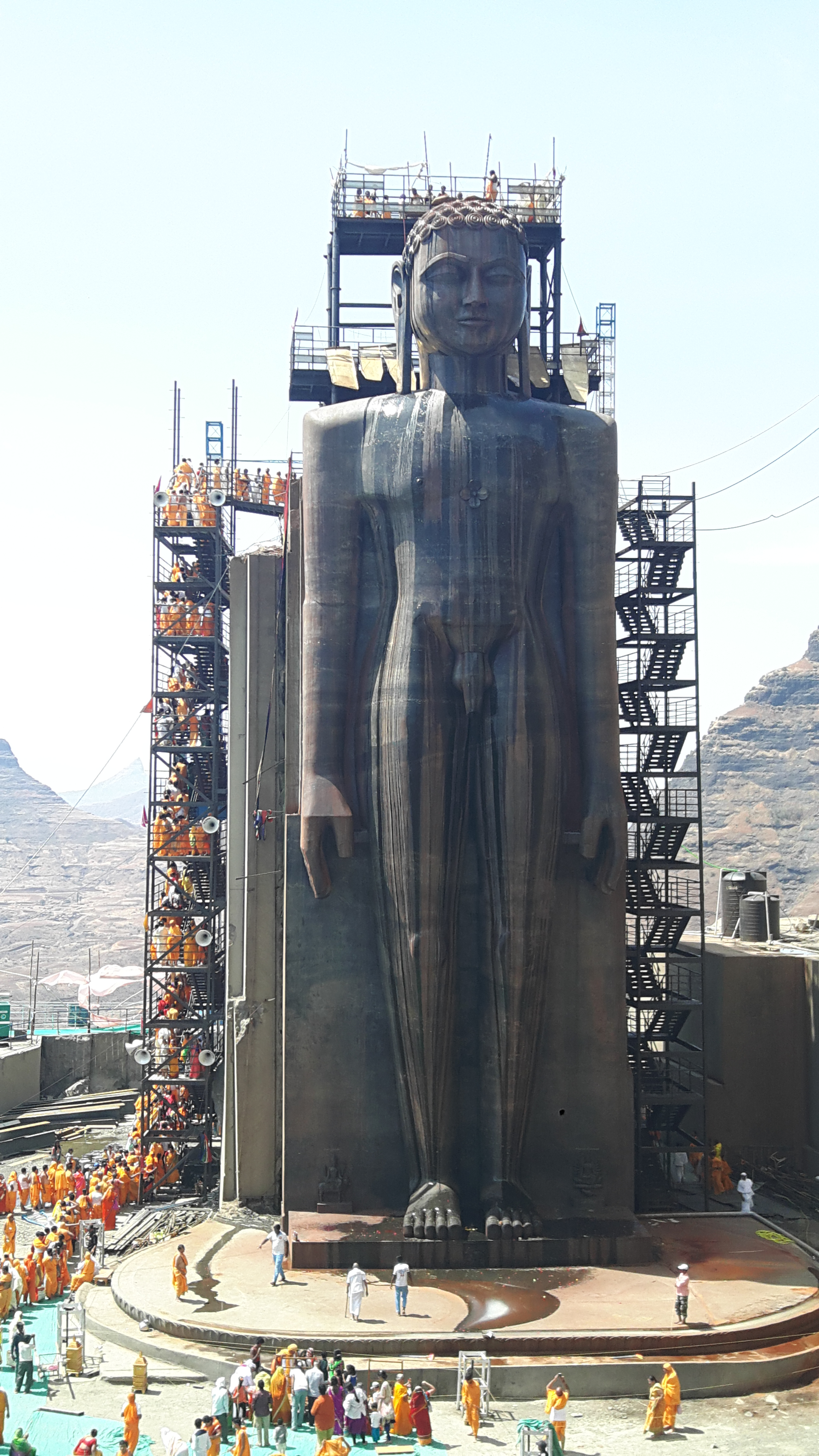
108 feet Rishabdev Bhagwan at Mangi Tungi

- Mumbai, Haji Ali Dargah, a popular mosque built in the sea off the coast of Worli,
- Mumbai, Mount Mary church in the suburb of Bandra
- Nanded, Hazur Sahib Nanded Gurudwara, the resting place of Sikh Guru Gobind Singh.The city also has many shrines dedicated to Sufi saints.
- Parbhani: The city of Parbhani, in the Marathwada region of the state, is well known for Sufi shrine of the great saint Shah Turabul Haq. The annual two week fair in the honour of the saint in February attracts around half a million pilgrims to the city. Because of its popularity within Maharashtra, it is often called as Ajmer Sharif of Maharashtra.
- The Statue of Ahimsa, a 108 ft idol of first Jain tirthankara Rishabhanatha carved in monolithic stone was consecrated at Mangi Tungi in February 2016. It is recorded in the Guinness Book of World Records as the tallest Jain idol in the world. It has become a major pilgrimage and tourist destination.
- Pune, Osho International Meditation Resort. It attracts visitors from other parts of India and abroad.

==== Kumbhoj ====
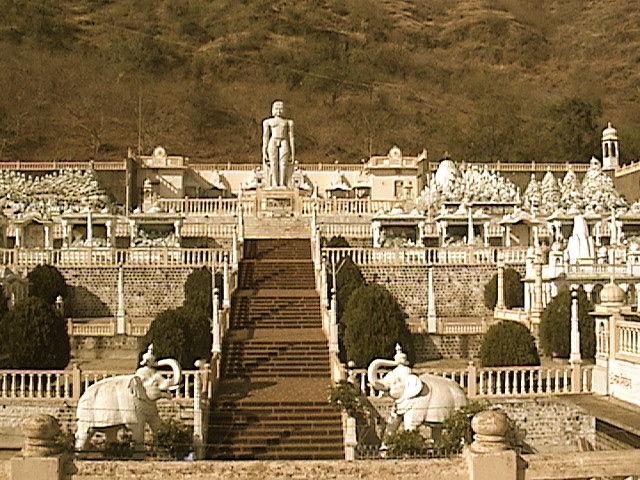
28-foot (8.5 m)-high monolith of Bahubali at Kumbhoj

Kumbhoj is the name of an ancient town located in Kolhapur district, Maharashtra. The town is about eight kilometers from Hatkanangale, about twenty seven kilometers from Kolhapur. The famous Jain pilgrimage centre where a 28-foot (8.5 m)-high statue of Bahubali is installed is 2 kilometres (1.2 mi) from the Kumbhoj city.

== Tourism development ==
Maharashtra Tourism Development Corporation (MTDC) is the state government owned official destination marketing organization (DMO) for promotion of Maharashtra tourism in the world. MTDC employs a range of marketing tools such as Tourism promotion Literature and publications in traditional media as well as digital marketing to promote tourism in the state. The corporation also arranges FAM tours and organizes Cultural Events and Festivals as tools to promote the state. Since inception in 1975, MTDC has been involved in the development and maintenance of various tourist locations of Maharashtra. MTDC owns and maintains resorts at key tourist centres throughout the state.

== Gallery ==
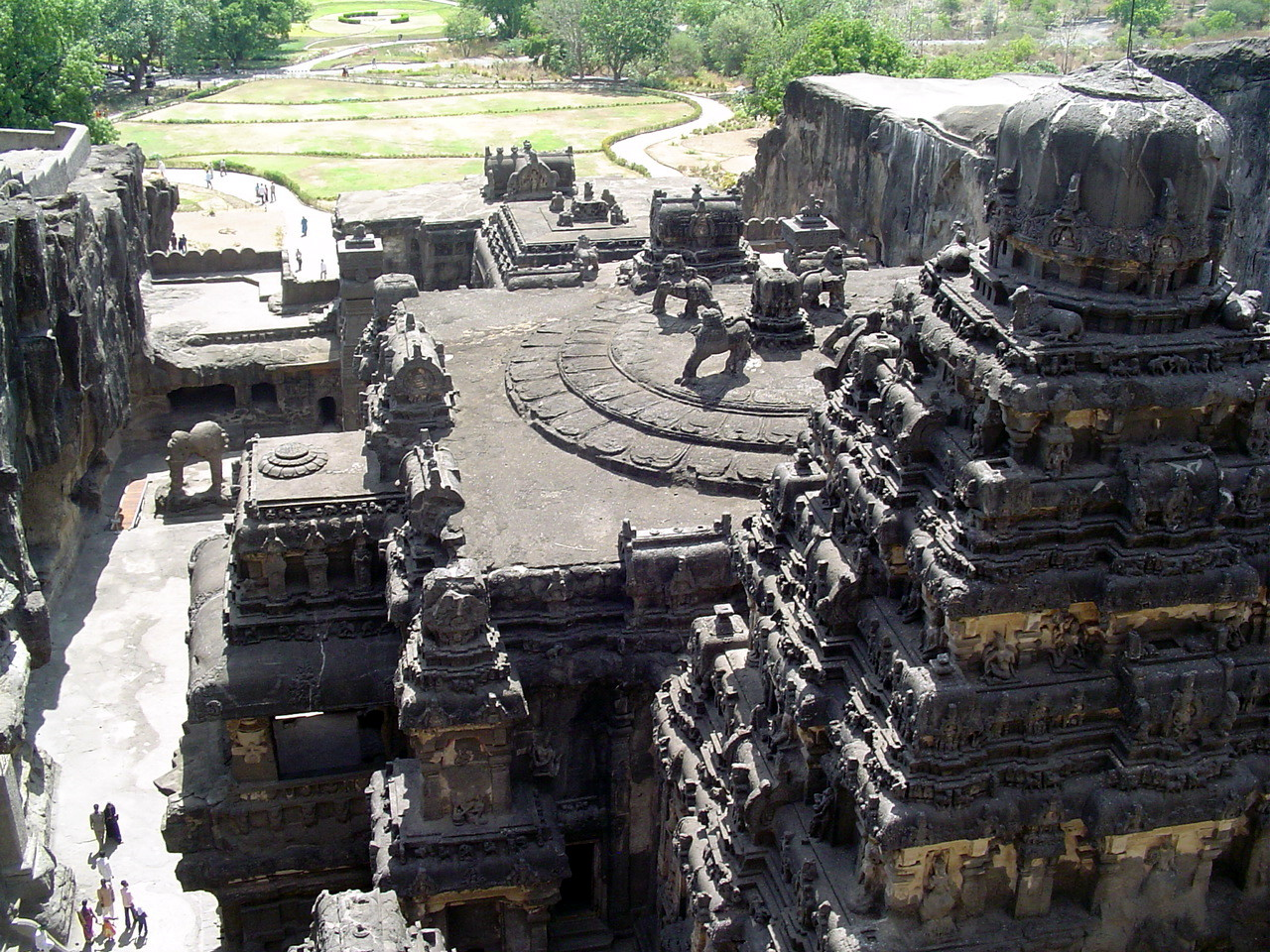
Kailasa Temple in Ellora Caves

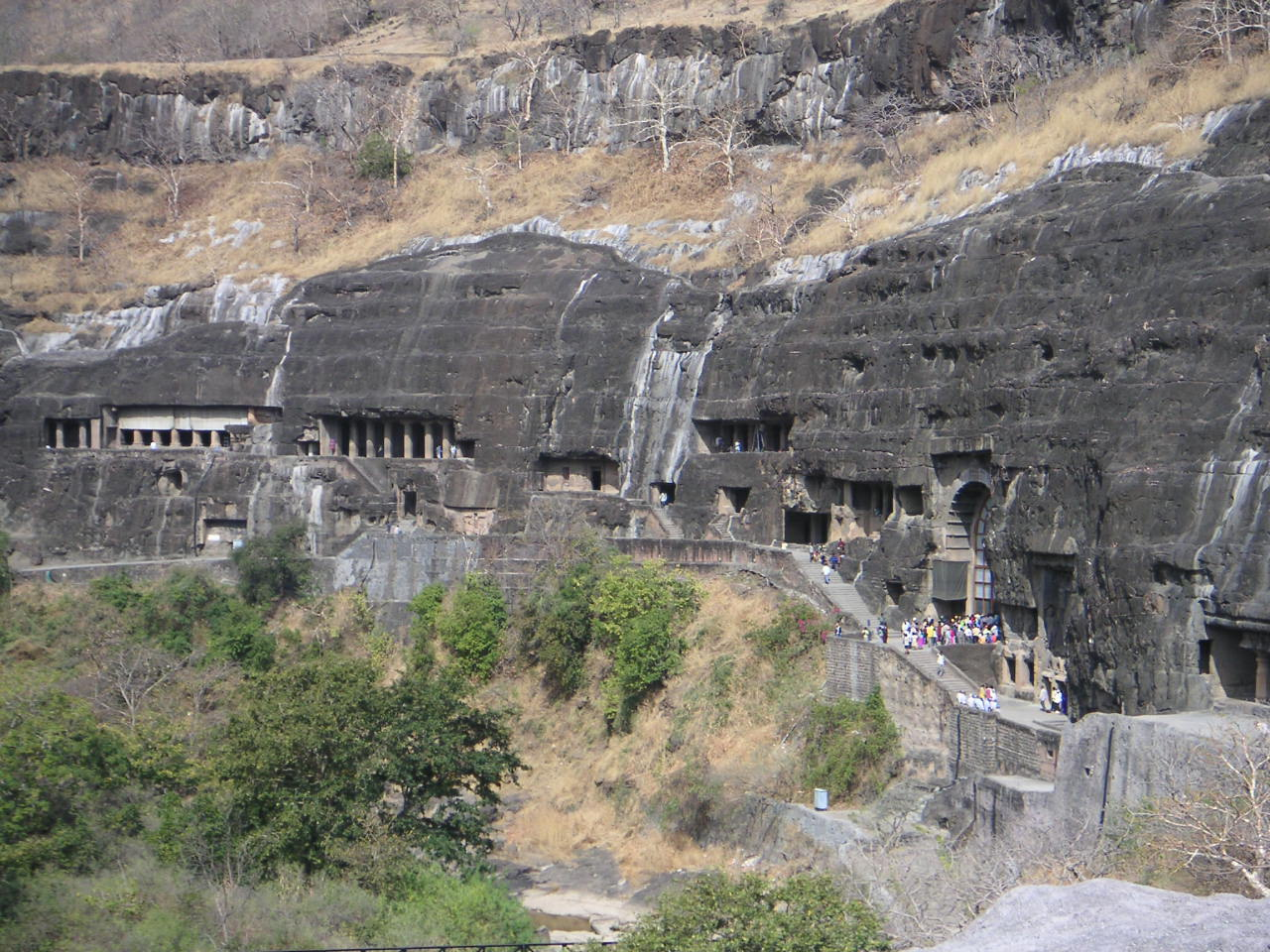
Ajanta Caves

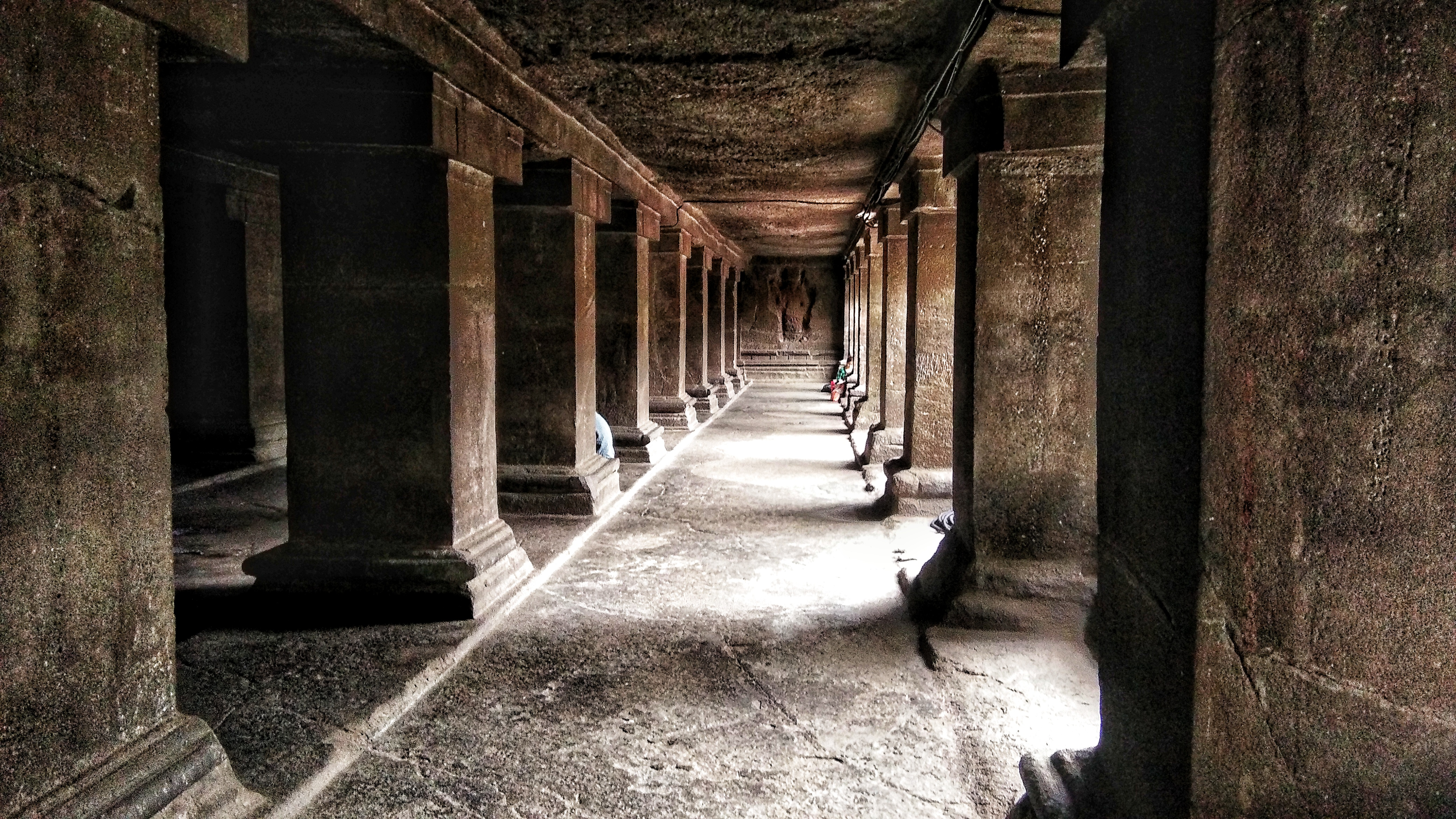
Temple corridor of the Pataleshwar cave temple, built during the Rashtrakuta Empire.

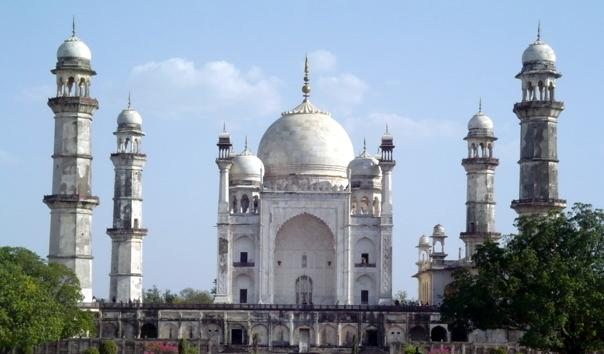
Bibi Ka Maqbara

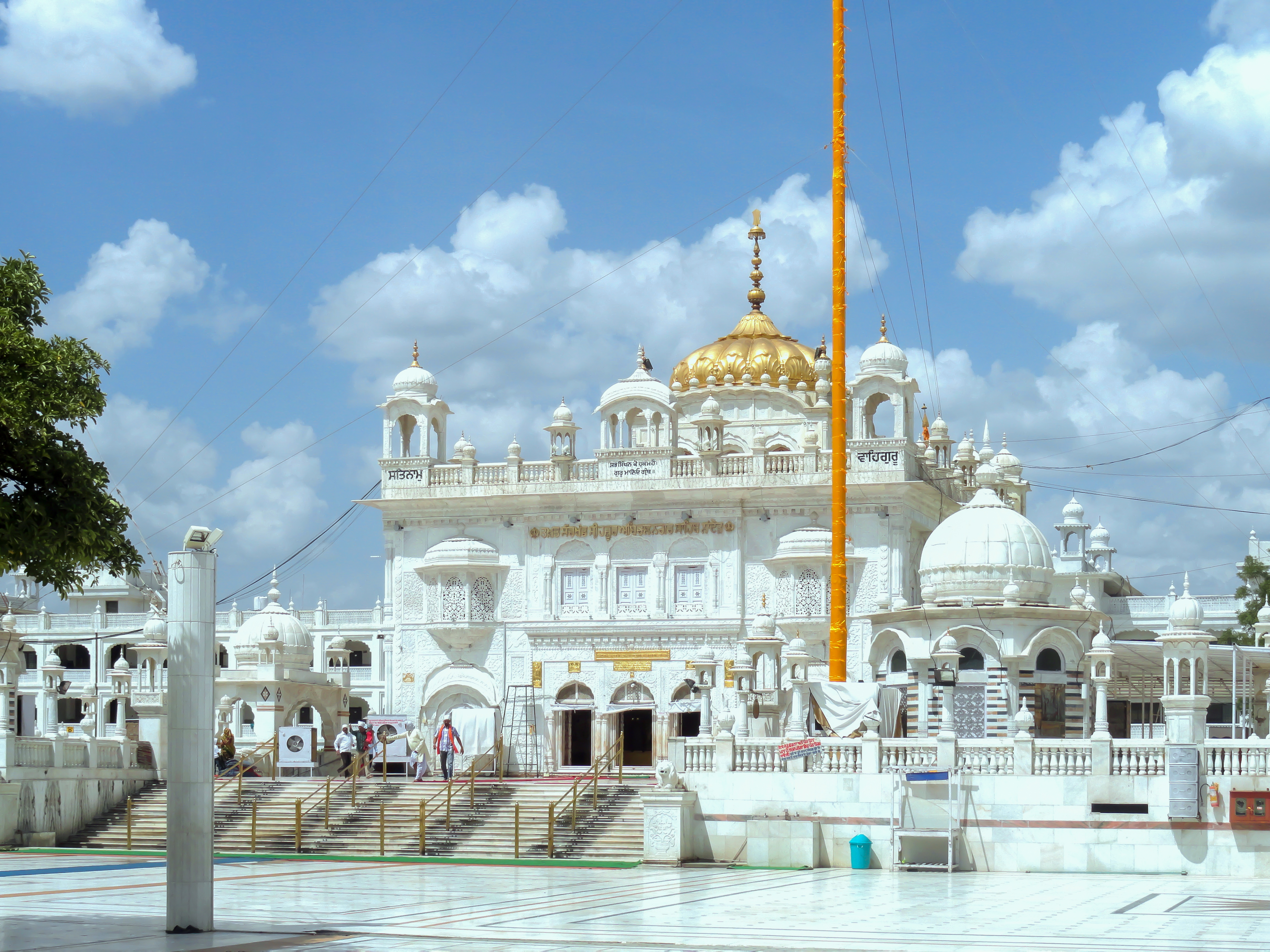
Hazur Sahib Nanded, 2nd holiest site in Sikhism

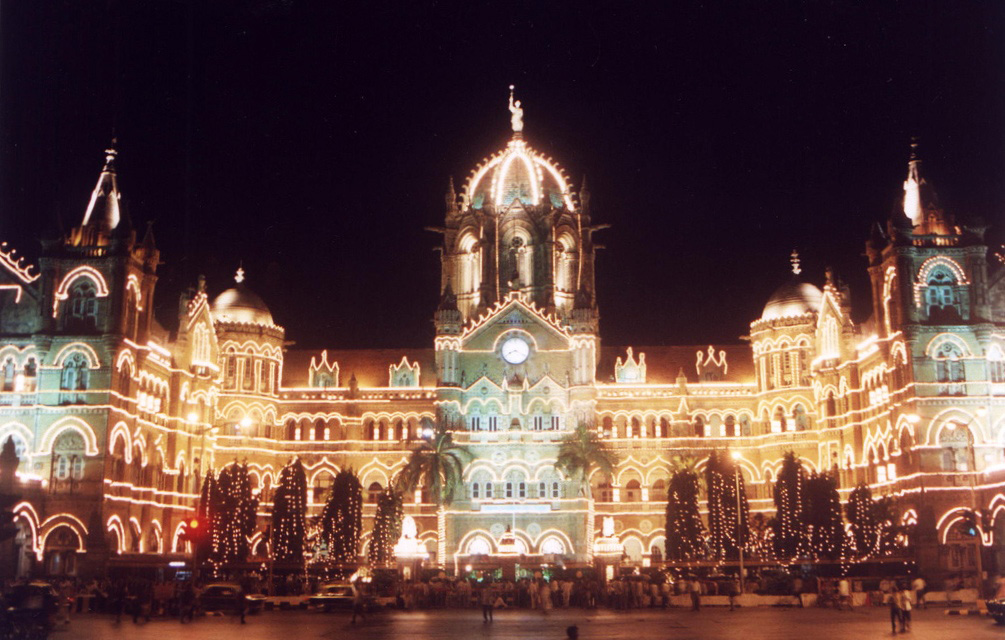
Chhatrapati Shivaji Terminus

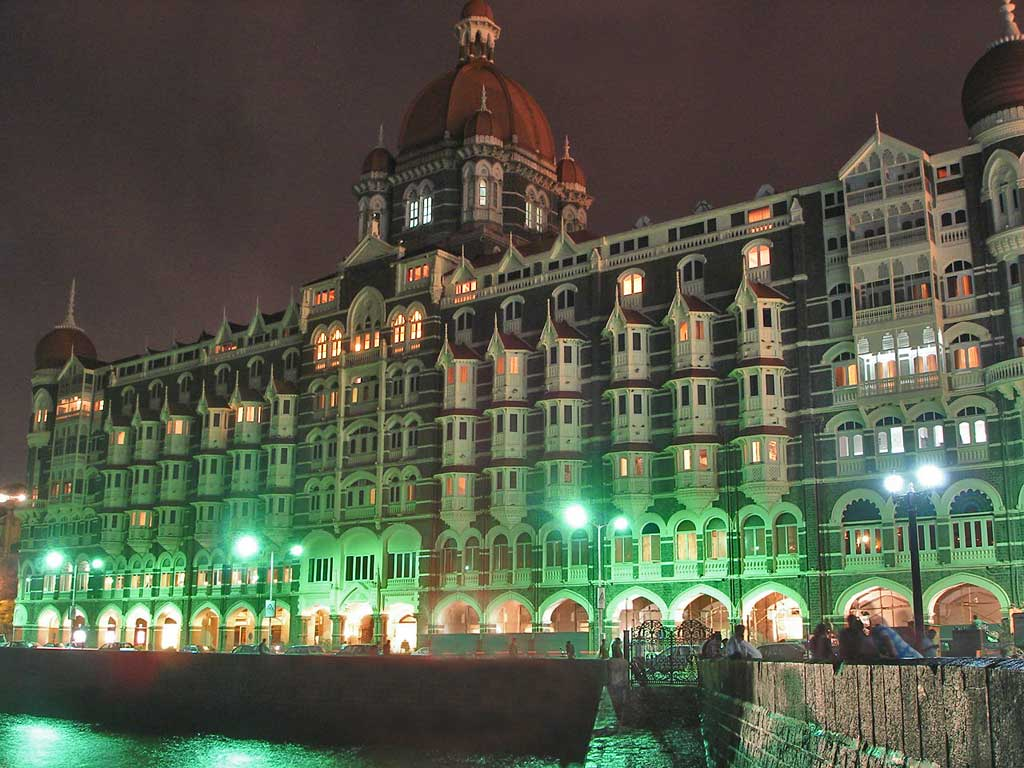
Taj Mahal Palace & Tower

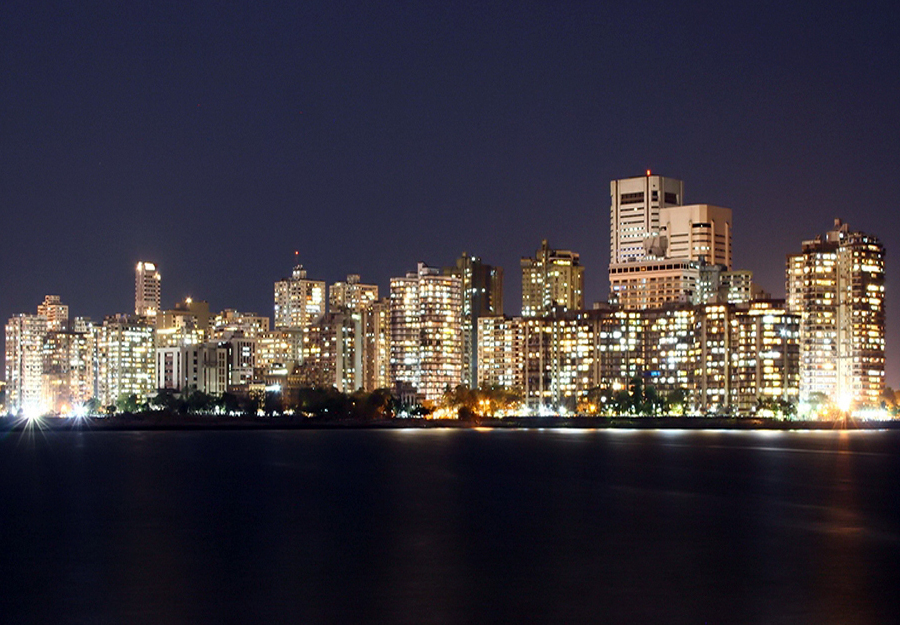
Nariman Point and Cuffe Parade

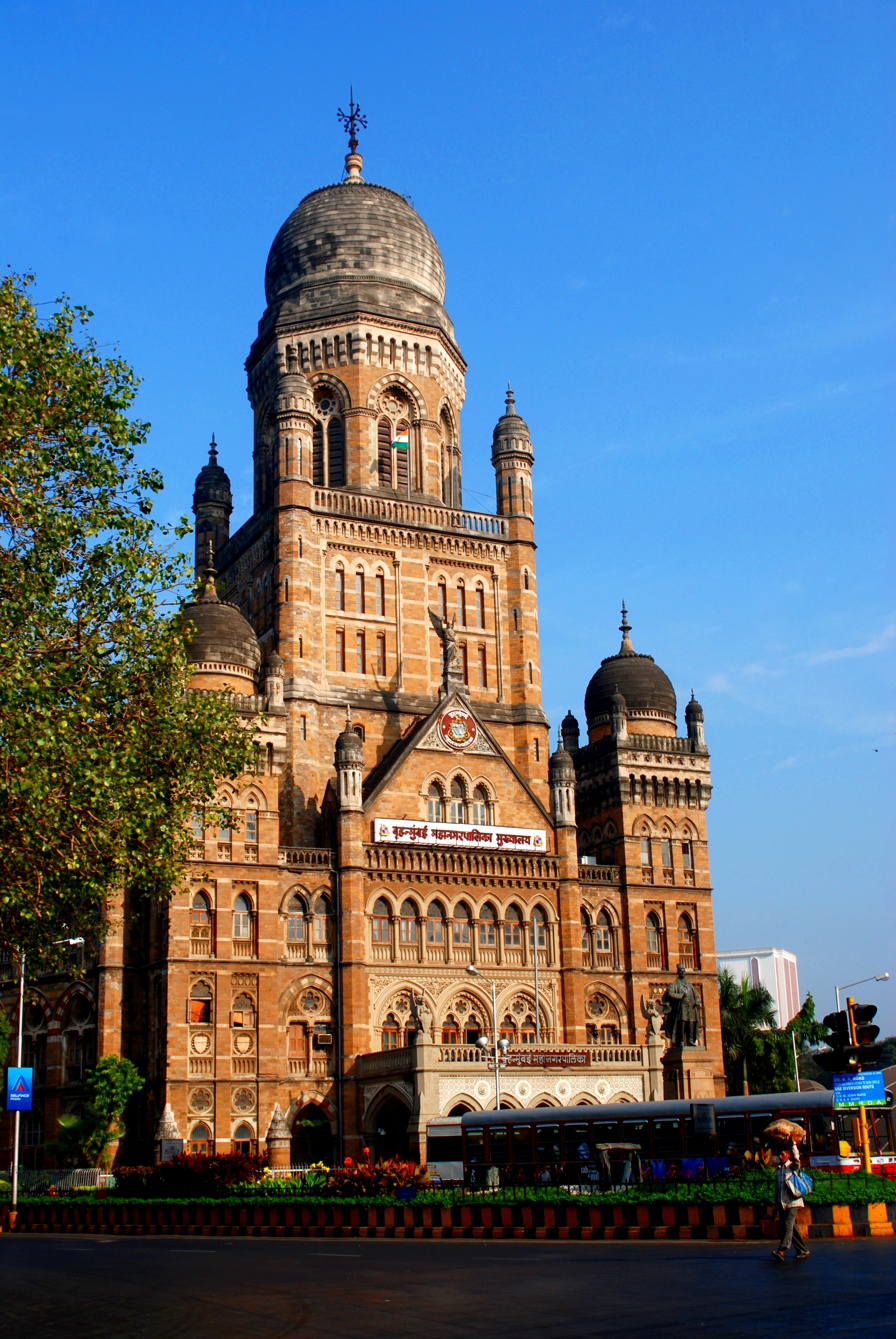
BMC

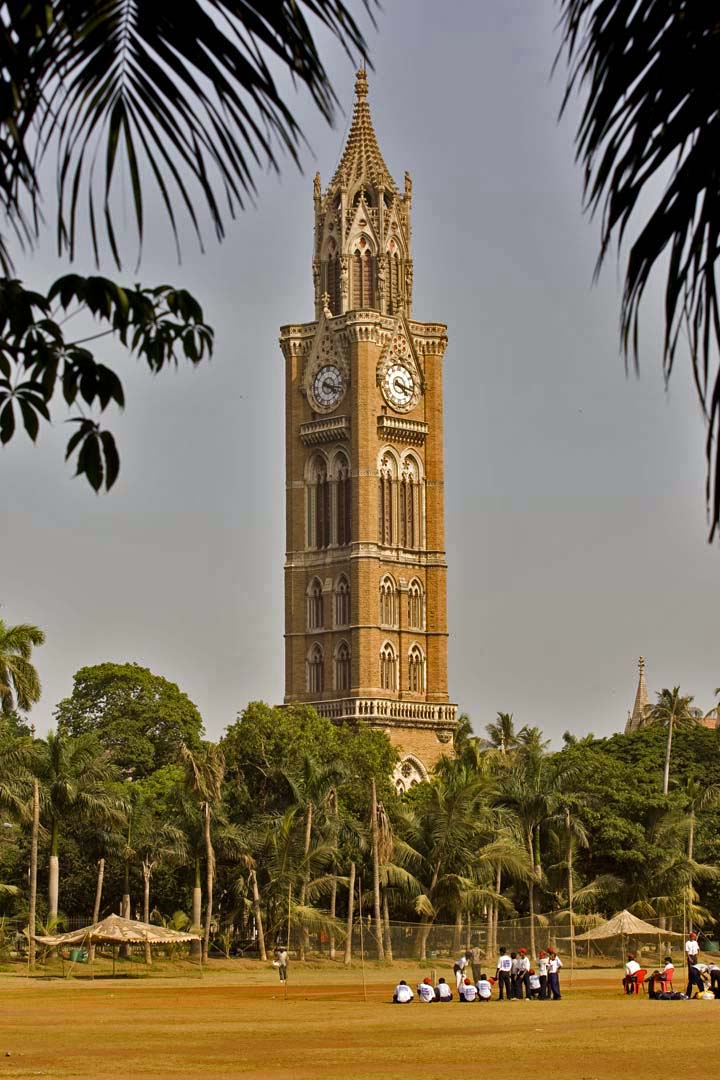
Rajabai Clock Tower at the University of Mumbai

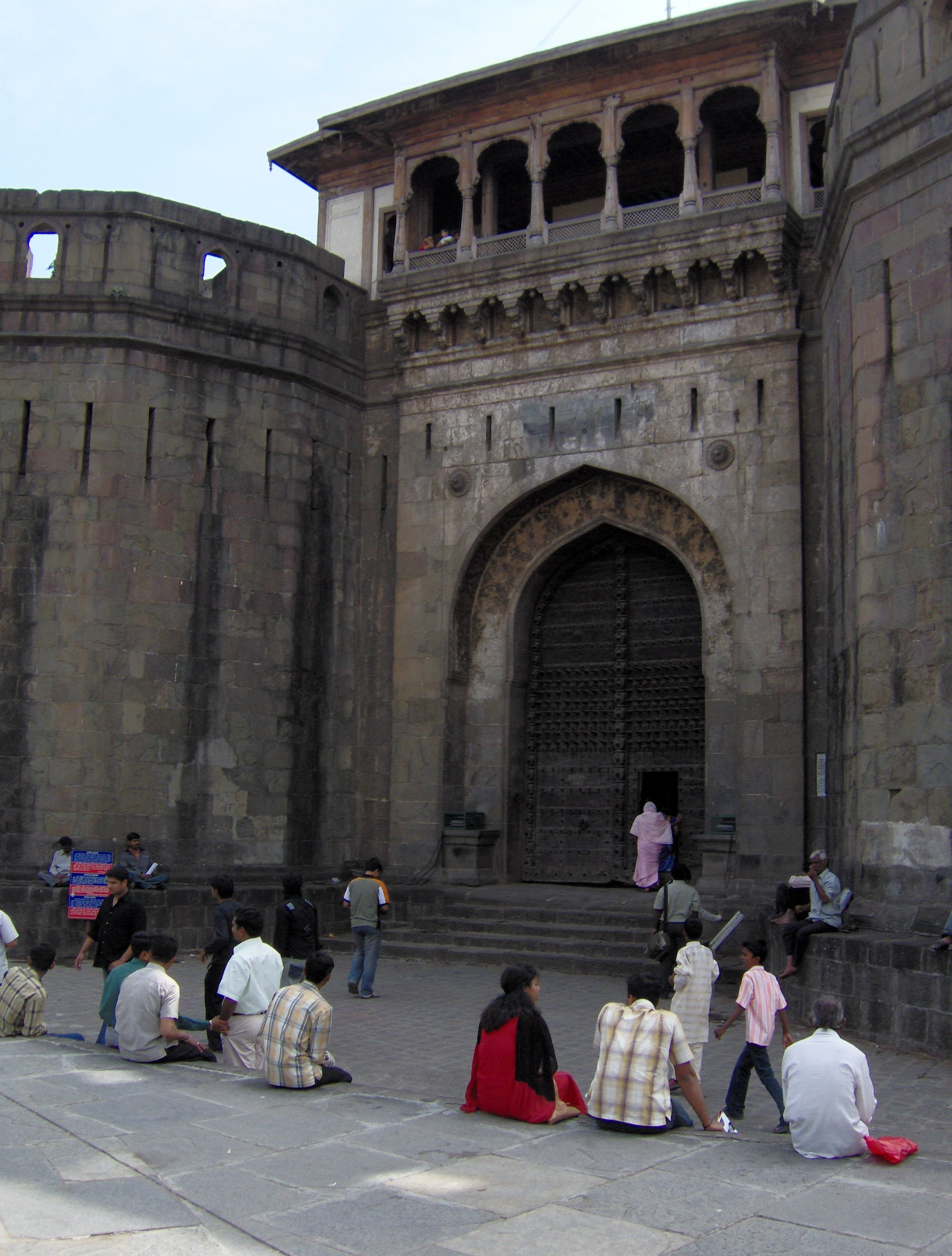
Shaniwarwada

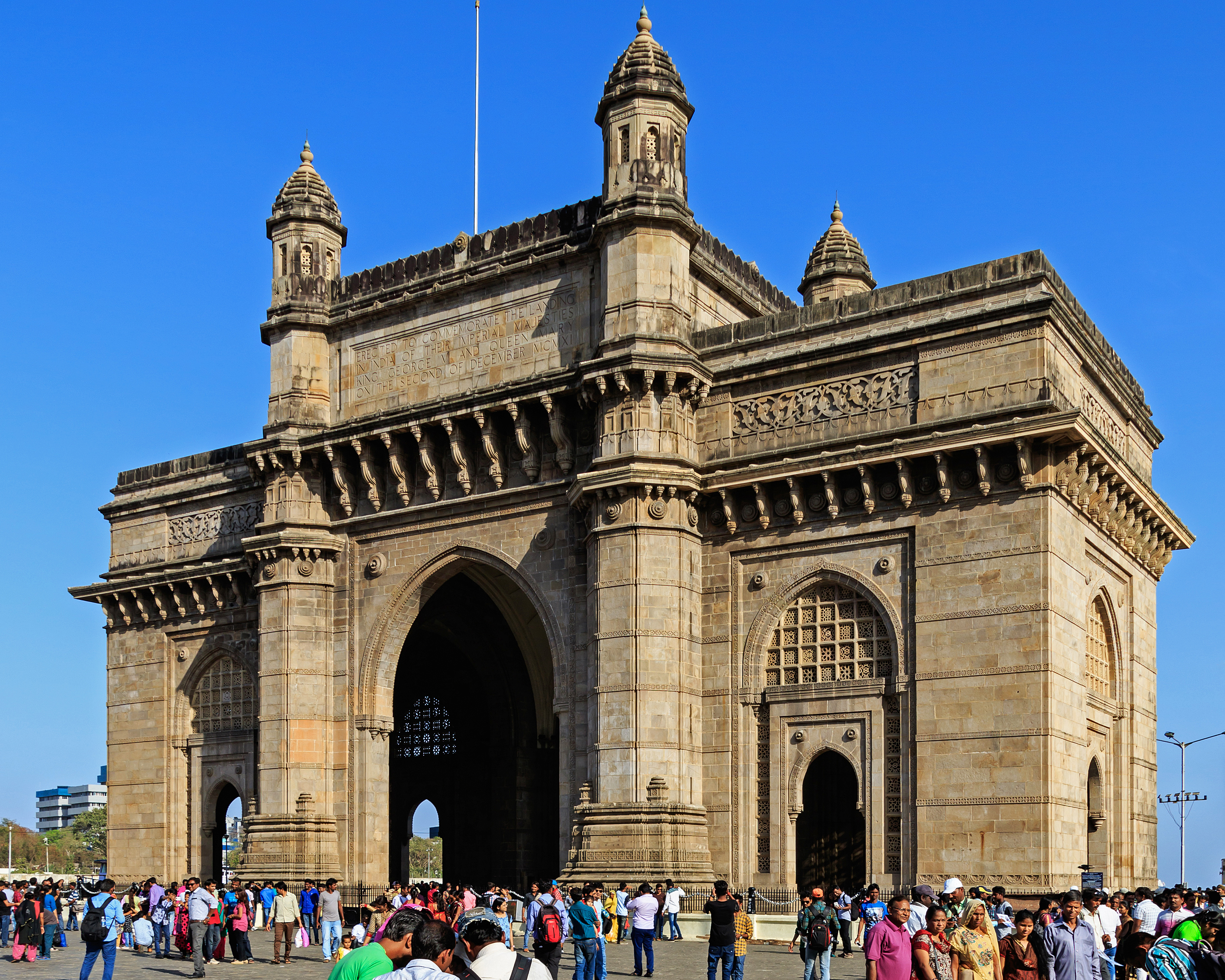
Gateway of India

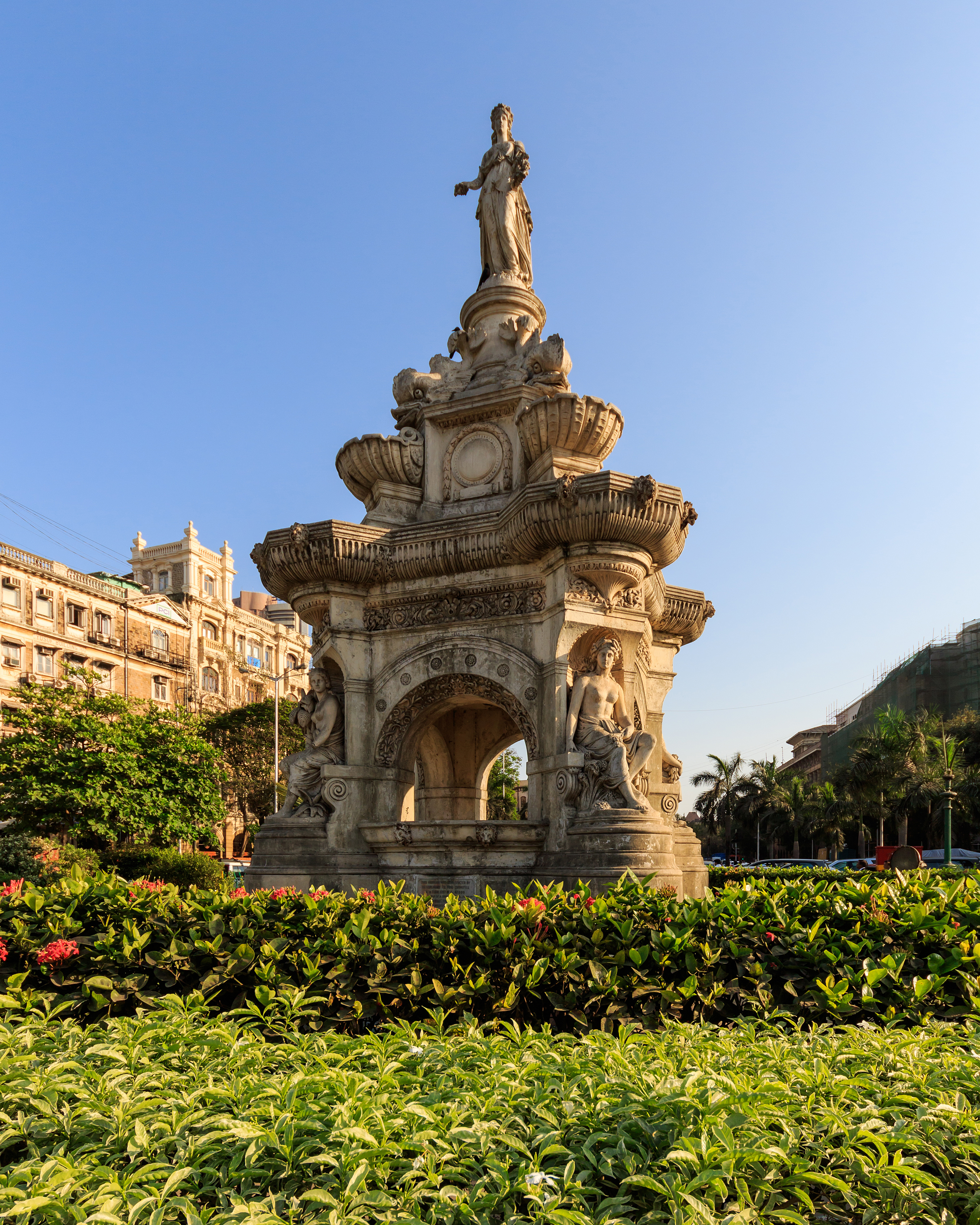
Flora Fountain

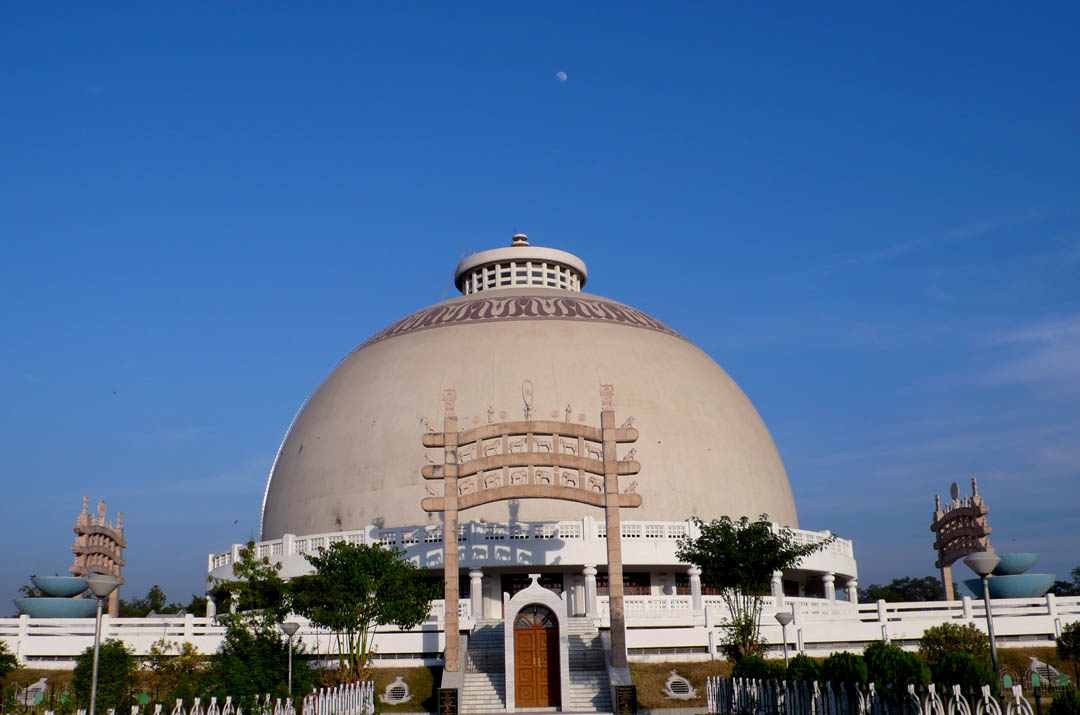
Deekshabhoomi

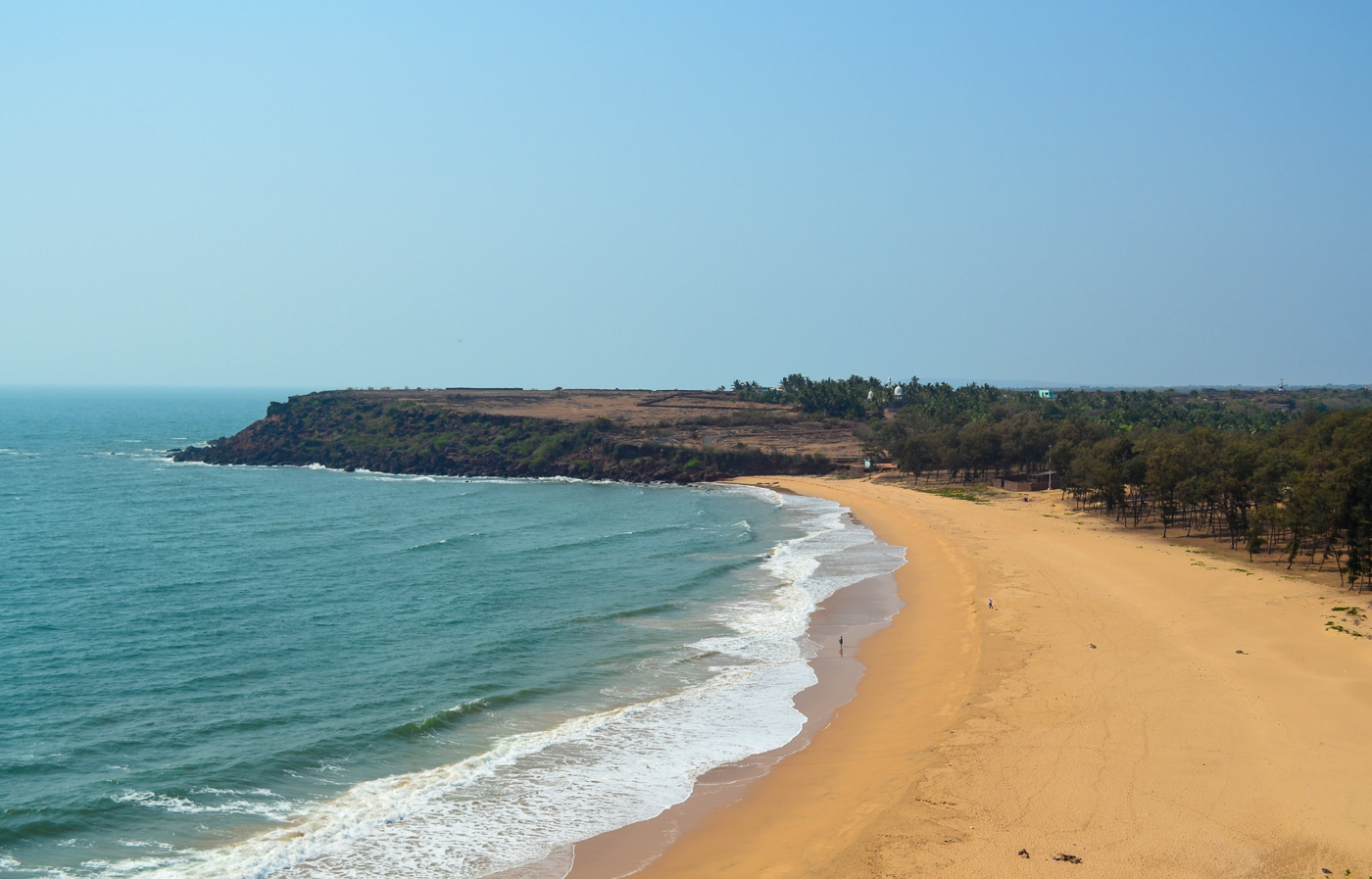
Devgad Beach, Sindhudurg district

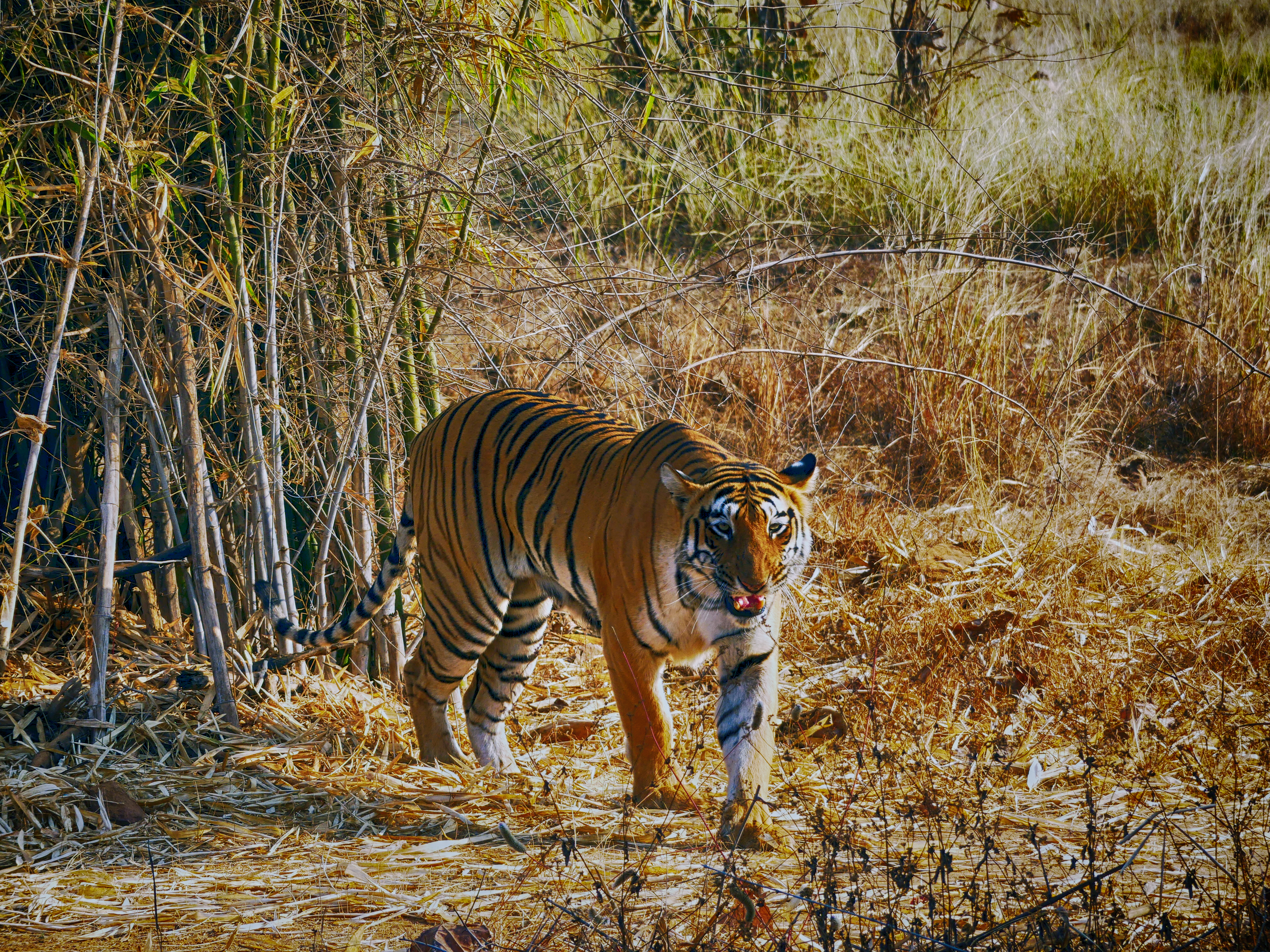
Tadoba Andhari Tiger Reserve is famous for Jungle safari

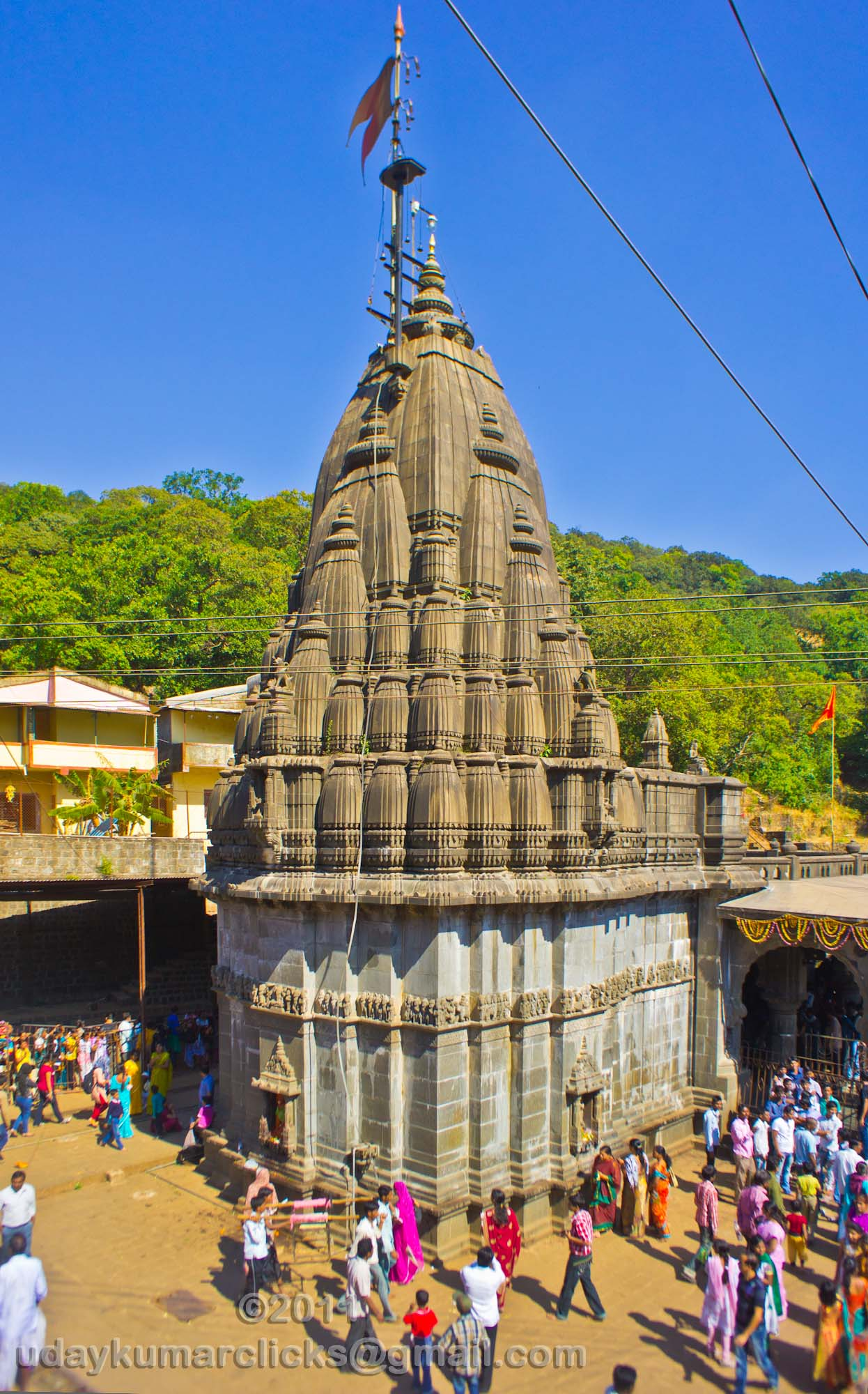
Bhimashankar Temple in Pune district is one of twelve Jyotirlinga

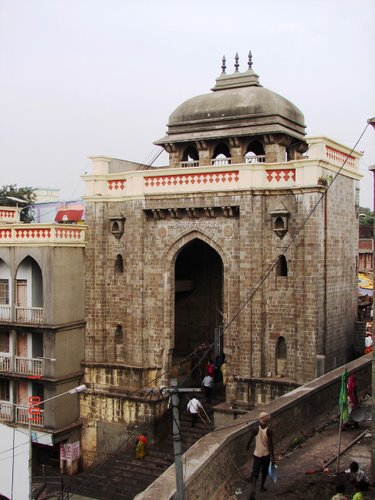
Famous Tulja Bhavani Temple of Tuljapur town of Osmanabad district.

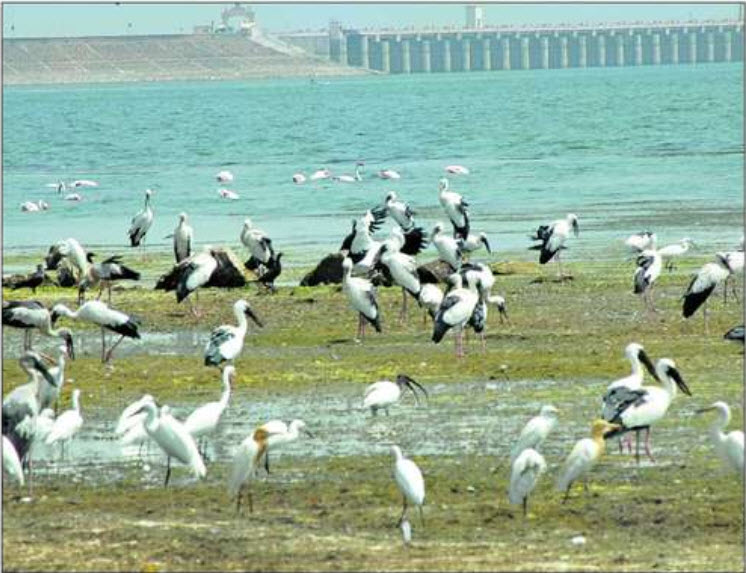
Migratory birds at Jayakwadi Dam, the main source of water for Marathwada.

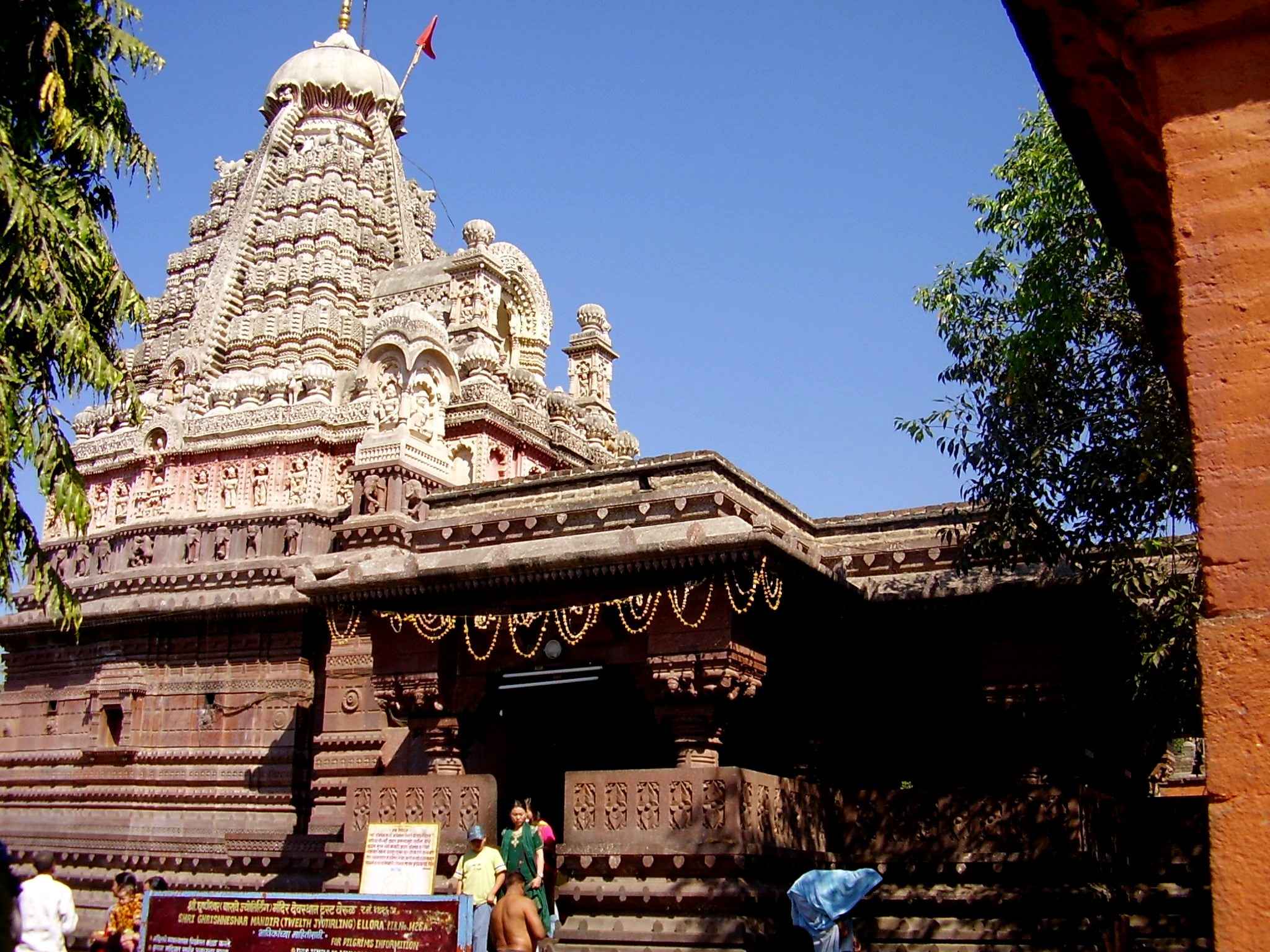
Grishneshwar Jyotirlinga in Aurangabad district.

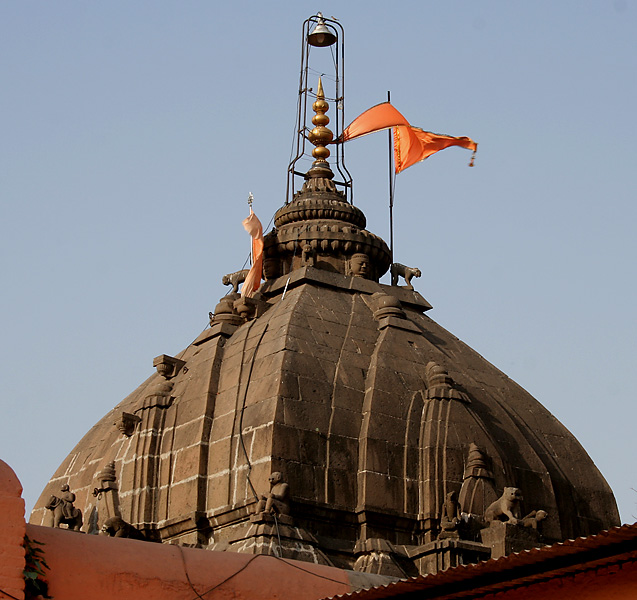
A view of Parli Vaijnath Temple, Beed district.

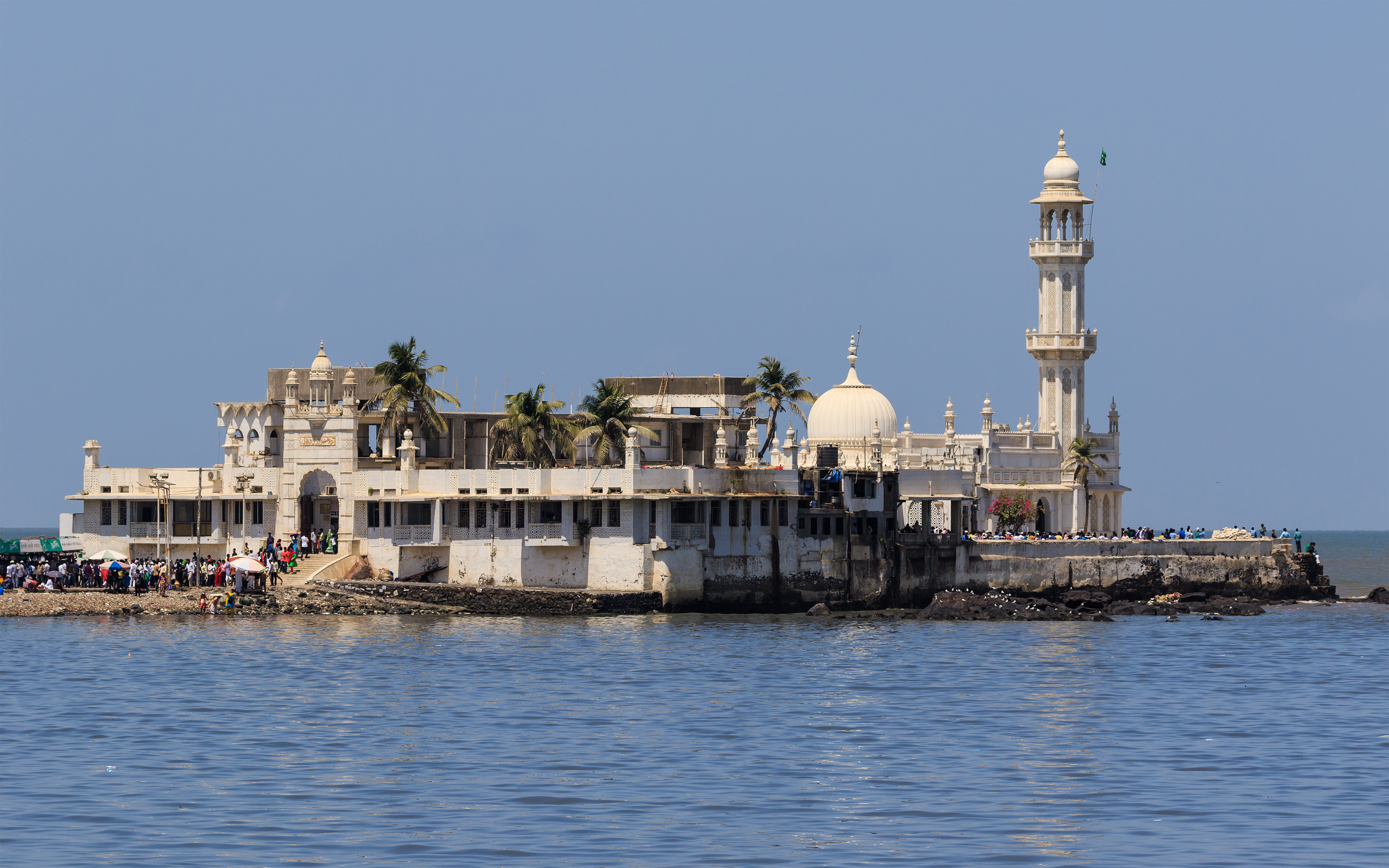
The Haji Ali Mosque was built in 1431, when Mumbai was under Islamic rule.

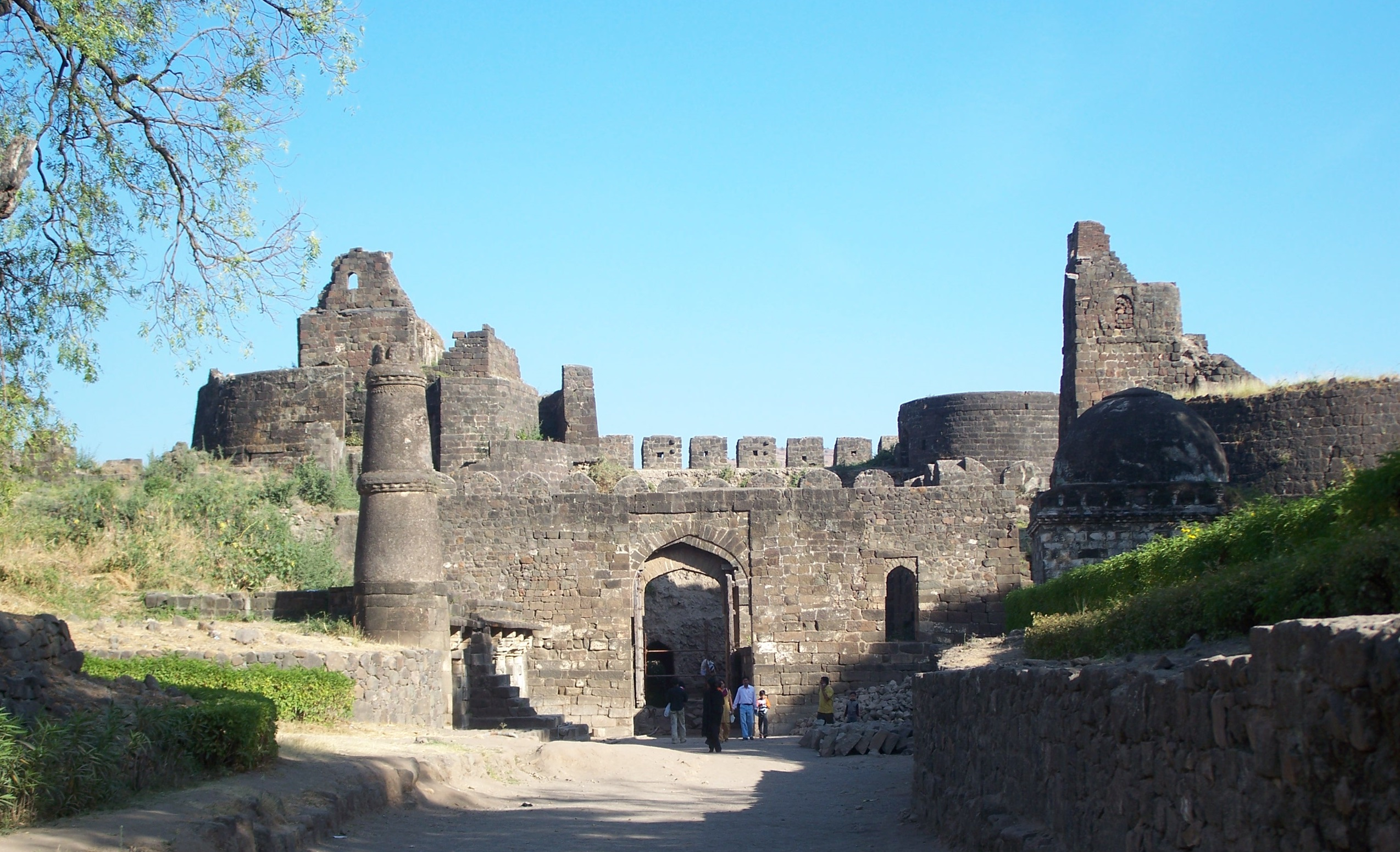
Daulatabad Fort (Deogiri)

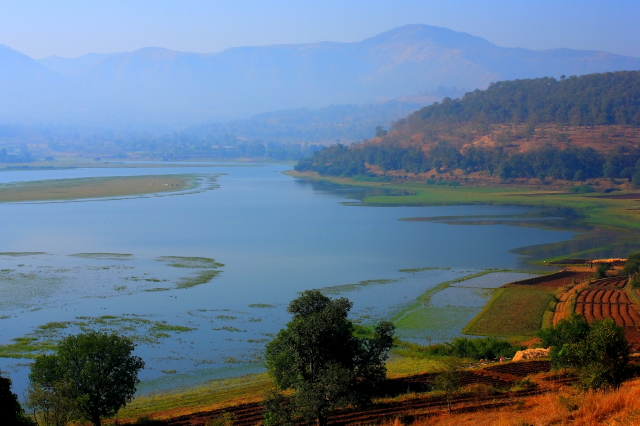
Mula and Mutha rivers

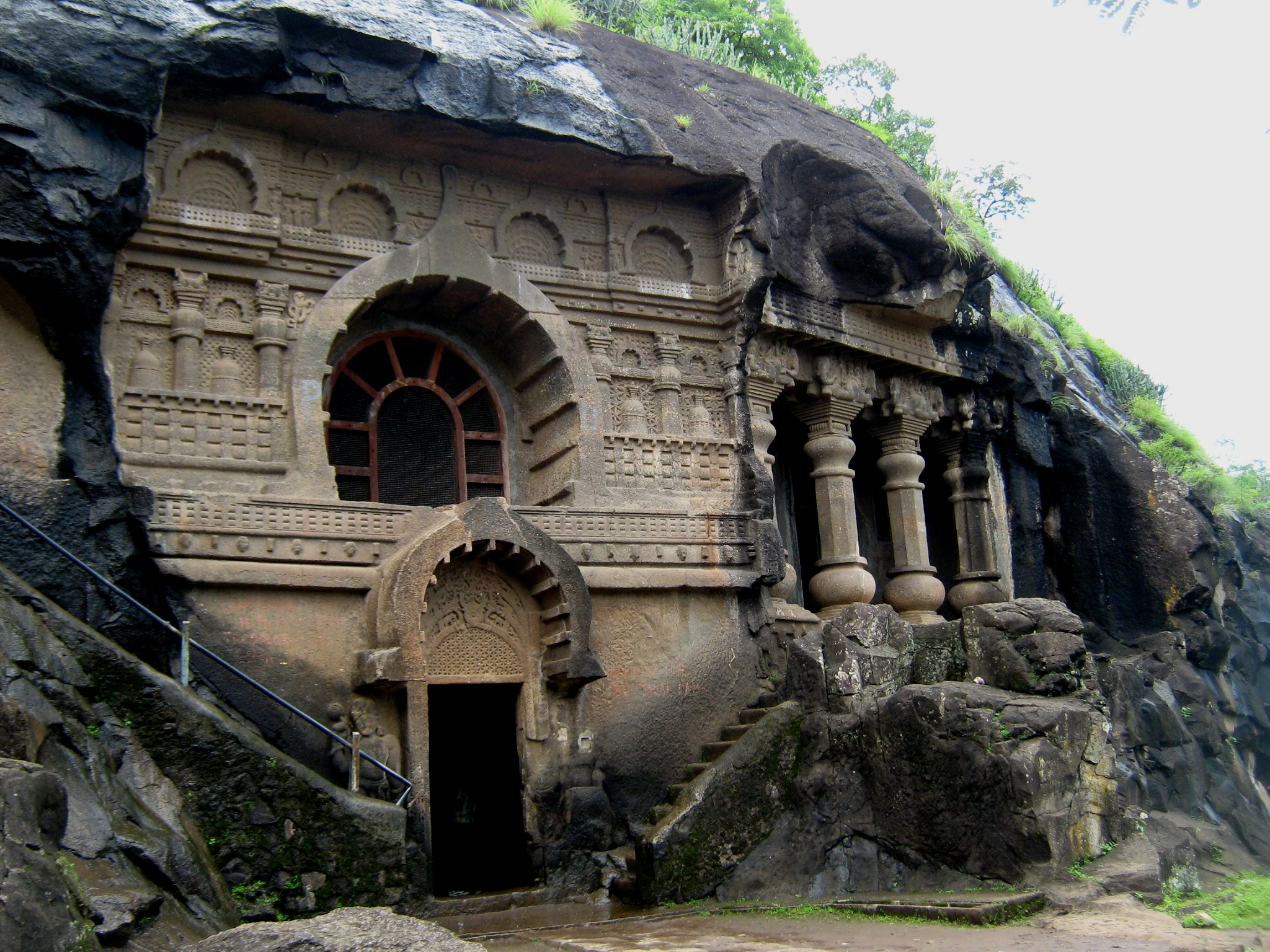
1 st century BCE Pandavleni Caves in Nashik

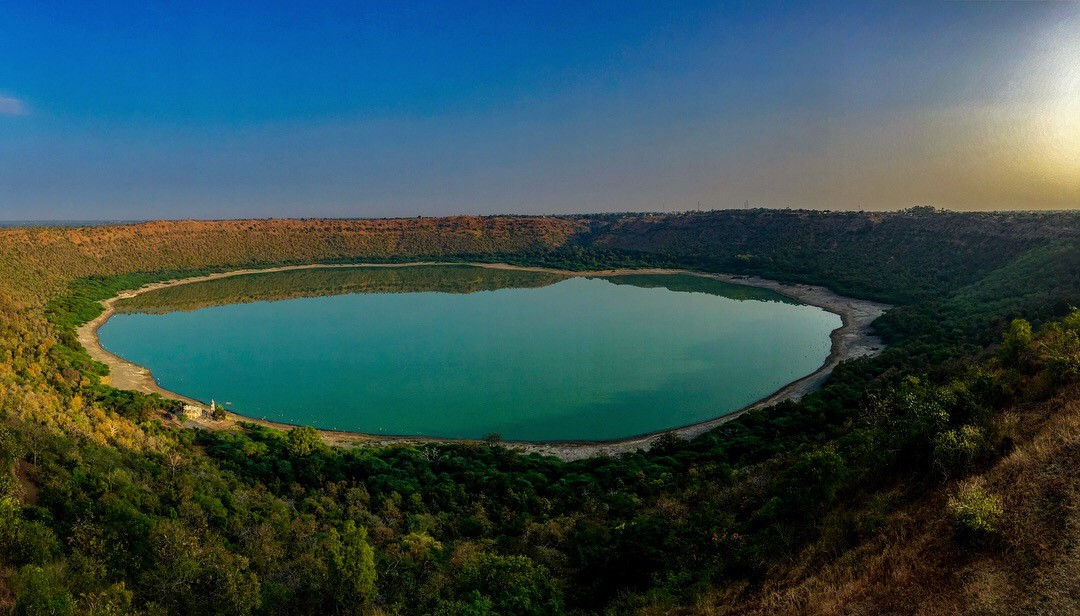
Lonar Lake in Maharashtra by crater lake impact
