= Nashik grape =

Variety of grape

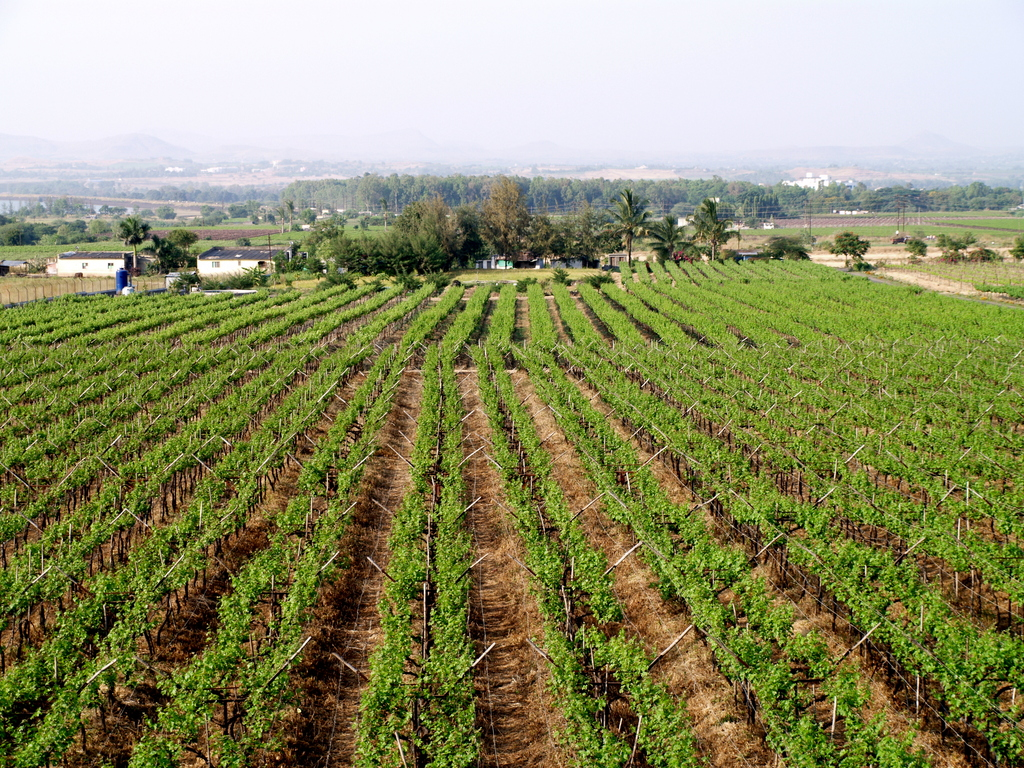
A grape vineyard in Nashik.

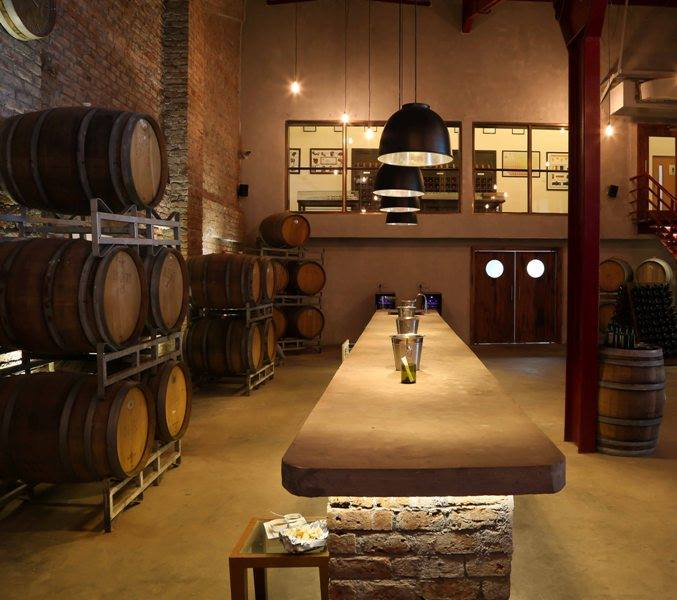
Tasting cellar at Sula Wineyard.

Nashik grape is a variety of grape produced in Nashik district, which is known as the "grape capital of India". It is known for its large size, crunchy texture, and balanced sweet-tart flavor.

Nashik contributes to more than half of the total grape export from the country. Nashik is one of the very few regions globally where harvesting takes place from February to April, allowing its grapes to command a premium position in the global marketplace.

== Production ==
Nashik, called "grape capital of India", is the leading grape producer in the country, with about 1.75 lakh hectare of land under grape cultivation as of December 2015. It produces an estimated 10 lakh tonne grape at about 20 tonne per hectare. About 8,000 acres are used for cultivation of grape wine varieties. The catchment areas of grape production in Nashik district are Kalwan, Peint Igatpuri, Sinnar, Niphad, Yeola, Nandgaon, Satana, Surgana, Dindori and Malegaon.

== Export ==
Nashik accounts for 55 percent of total grape exports from India and 75 percent from the state of Maharashtra. Nashik grape export increased from about 4,000 tonnes in 2003 to over 48,000 tonnes in 2013. The export further increased to more than 65,000 tonnes in 2014. About half of the export corresponds to the Netherlands; with Germany, United Kingdom and Belgium as the next major destinations. In 2013–14, Russia and China emerged as major markets for Nashik grape.

== Geographical Indication ==
Nashik grape received the Geographical Indication status in 2010–11, as per Geographical Indications of Goods (Registration and Protection) Act, 1999.
