= Surgana State =

Subdivision of British India

Coordinates: 20.57°N 73.62°E

- Princely State of British India
- Late 18th century–1948
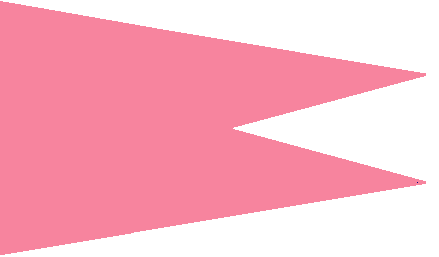
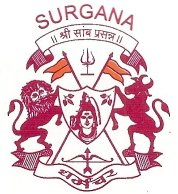
- Flag Coat of arms

- Surgana State in Nasik Agency during British India
- Capital: Surgana
- Demonym: koli
- Area
  - 1901: 932.4 km^{2} (360.0 sq mi)
- Population
  - 1901: 11,532
  - 1921: 14,912
- Legislature
  - Upper house: Pawar
- History
  - Established: Late 18th century
  - Independence of India: 1948
Succeeded by
India
- Today part of: Maharashtra, India

Surgana State was a princely state of the Bombay Presidency during the era of the British Raj. It was the only state belonging to the Nasik Agency. Its capital was Surgana in Nashik District of present-day Maharashtra. It was ruled by Pawar dynasty of koli.

Surgana State's last ruler signed the instrument of accession to join India in March 1948.

== History ==
Surgana State was founded before the 1800s by the Maratha Pawar family. Surgana State was converted into a British protectorate in 1818 after they attacked a British police party passing through Surgana and were defeated. The British made the cousin of the Deshmukh, Bhikaji Rao as the new chief as he helped them against the Peshwa. Bhikaji Rao was murdered in the riot caused by the mother of Malharrao and her brother-in-law, Pilaji. Pilaji was captured and executed by the British. The descendants of Malharrao were allowed the share in revenues of the state in 1846 and were granted an allowance grant in 1877. The chief of the state had powers to elect a Representative Member of the Chambers of Princes from 1921 to 1947. In March 1948, the last chief Dhairyashil Rao signed the Gujarat States Merger Agreement and ceded the state to India.

Later Dhairyashil Rao also served as the Member of the Rajya Sabha in 1952–1968 and 1972–1978.

The Princely State was bordered on the south by Peinth in Nasik, and in the west by the Bansda and Dharampur States.

=== Rulers ===
The rulers of the state bore the title deshmukh.

==== Deshmukhs ====
- bf.1800 – 1818 .....
- 1818 – 1819 Malhar Rao (d. 1819)
- 1819 – 1820 Bhikaji Rao
- 1820 – 1854 Jashwant Rao I Bhikaji Rao
- 1854 – 1867 Muvar Rao
- 1867 – 2 June 1898 Shankar Rao Ravi Rao (b. 1849 – d. ....)
- 1898 – 22 June 1930 Pratap Rao Shankar Rao (b. 18 August 1880 – d. 1930)
- 1930 – 1936 Jashwant Rao II Pratap Rao (b. 1902 – d. ....)
- April 1936 – 15 August 1947 Dhairyashil Rao Jashwant Rao (b. 1922 – 2003)

== See also ==
- Political integration of India
