= Surgana =

- Town
- Location in Maharashtra, India
- Coordinates: 20.57°N 73.62°E
- Country: India
- State: Maharashtra
- District: Nashik
- Elevation: 533 m (1,749 ft)

Population (2001)
  - Total: 6,144

Languages
  - Official: Marathi
- Time zone: UTC+5:30 (IST)
- ISO 3166 code: IN-MH
- Website: maharashtra.gov.in

Surgana is a census town and taluka in Nashik District in the Indian state of Maharashtra.

== History ==
During the British Raj era, Surgana State was one of several princely state governed by the Pawar dynasty of kshatriya Kolis. It was the only state of the Nasik Agency.

== Recent ==
55 bordering villages of Surgana taluka has submitted memorandum to join Gujarat. The efforts has been made by Surgana taluka Sangharsh Samiti.

== Geography ==
Surgana is located at 20.57°N 73.62°E. It has an average elevation of 533 metres (1748 feet). It is about 90 km from Nashik.

== Demographics ==
In the 2001 India census, Surgana had a population of 6,147. Males constituted 54% of the population and females 46%. Surgana had an average literacy rate of 70%, higher than the national average of 59.5%: male literacy was 75%, and female literacy was 64%. In 2001 in Surgana, 13% of the population was under 6 years of age.
