= Patilpada =

Patilpada may refer to the following places in Maharashtra, India:

- Patilpada, Dahanu (census code 551603), located off Savata road
- Patilpada, Dahanu (census code 551628), located near Gadchinchale
- Patilpada, Palghar (census code 551553), located near Vilatgaon
- Patilpada, Palghar (census code 551561), located near Karajgaon
- Patilpada, Palghar (census code 551571), located near the Talasari town
