= Thakarpada =

Thakarpada may refer to:

- Thakarpada (551539), a village in Talasari taluka of Palghar district in Maharashtra, India; located close to the National Highway 8, near Sanjan railway station
- Thakarpada (551567), a village in Talasari taluka of Palghar district in Maharashtra, India; located on the Maharashtra State Highway 73, near the Talasari town
