= Warli painting =

Art created by tribal people from Maharashtra, India

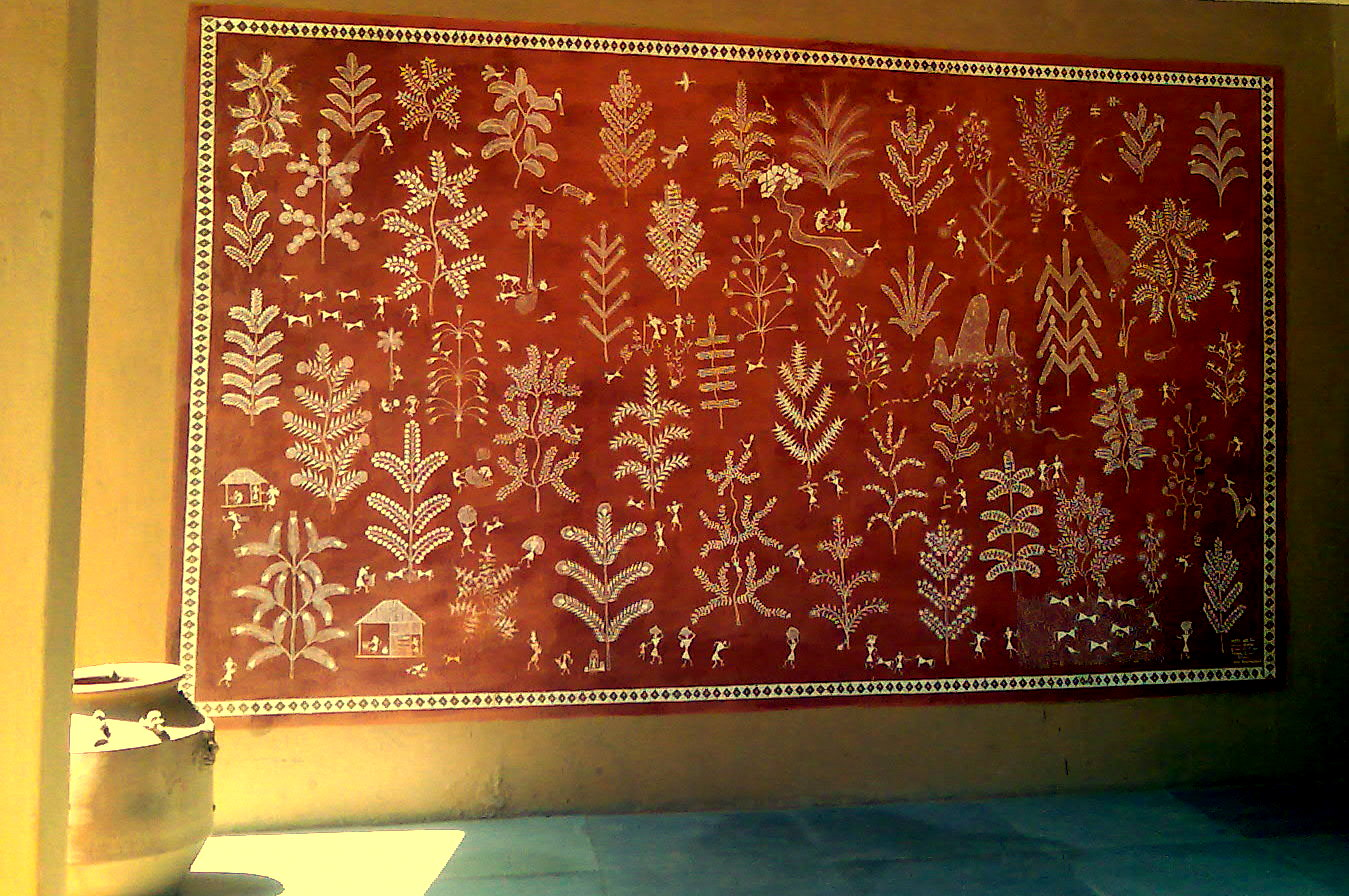
Warli paintings at Sanskriti Kendra Museum, Anandagram, New Delhi

Warli painting is tribal art mostly created by the Warli people from the North Sahyadri Range in Maharashtra, India. Warli paintings exist in cities such as Dahanu, Talasari, Jawhar, Palghar and Mokhada and originated in Maharashtra, where it is still practiced today. The paintings are usually done on mud walls, using a white pigment made from rice paste and water. They depict daily life, farming activities, animals, and natural elements in simple geometric shapes. Traditionally, Warli art is created by women and is often linked with rituals and celebrations.

== Tradition ==
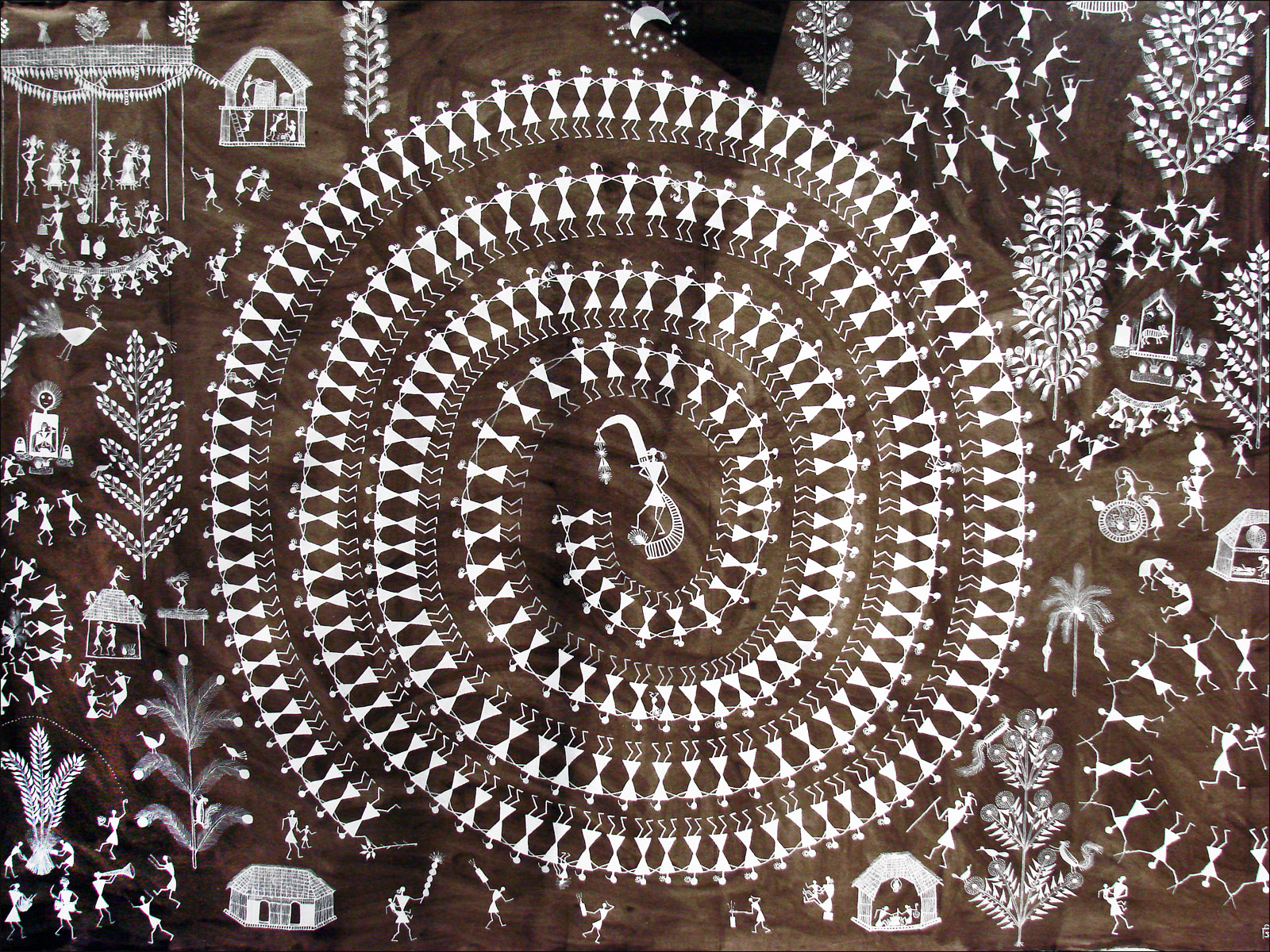
Warli painting from Thane district by Jivya Soma Mashe.

The Warli painting tradition in Maharashtra is among the finest examples of the folk style of paintings. The Warli tribe is one of the largest in India, located outside Mumbai. Till the 1970s, even though the tribal style of art is thought to date back as early as the 10th century C.E. The Warli culture is centered on the concept of Mother Nature and elements of nature are often focal points depicted in Warli painting. Farming is their main way of life and a large source of food for the tribe. They greatly respect nature and wildlife for the resources that they provide for life. Warli artists use their clay huts as the backdrop for their paintings, similar to how ancient people used cave walls as their canvas.

Jivya Soma Mashe, the artist in Thane district, has played a great role in making the Warli paintings more popular. Warli paintings were traditionally used as a means of transmitting folklore to people who were not familiar with written language. They also depict the social life of the Warli community and its connection with animals and nature.

== Painting technique ==
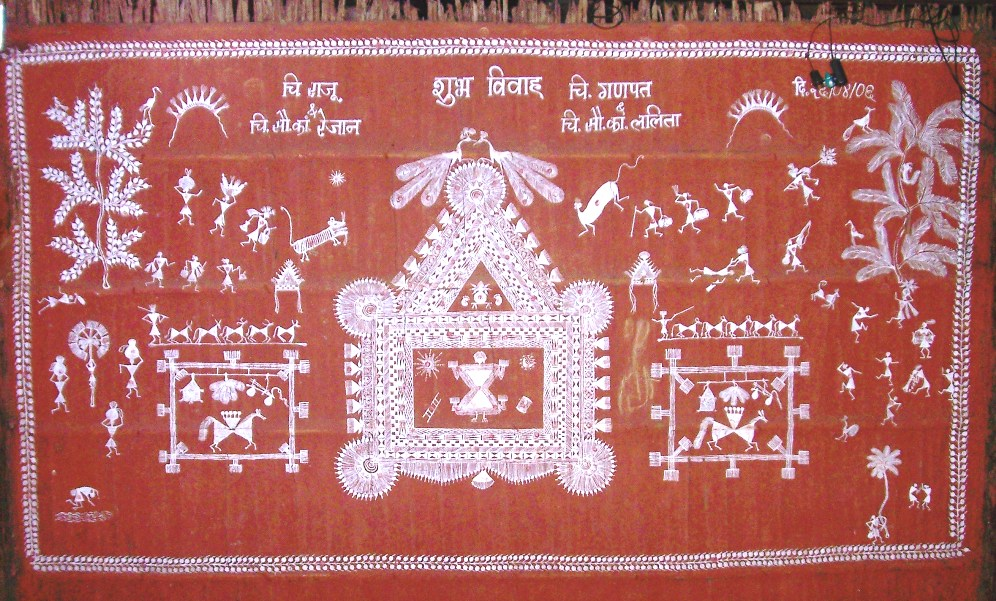
Warli painting depicting a wedding.

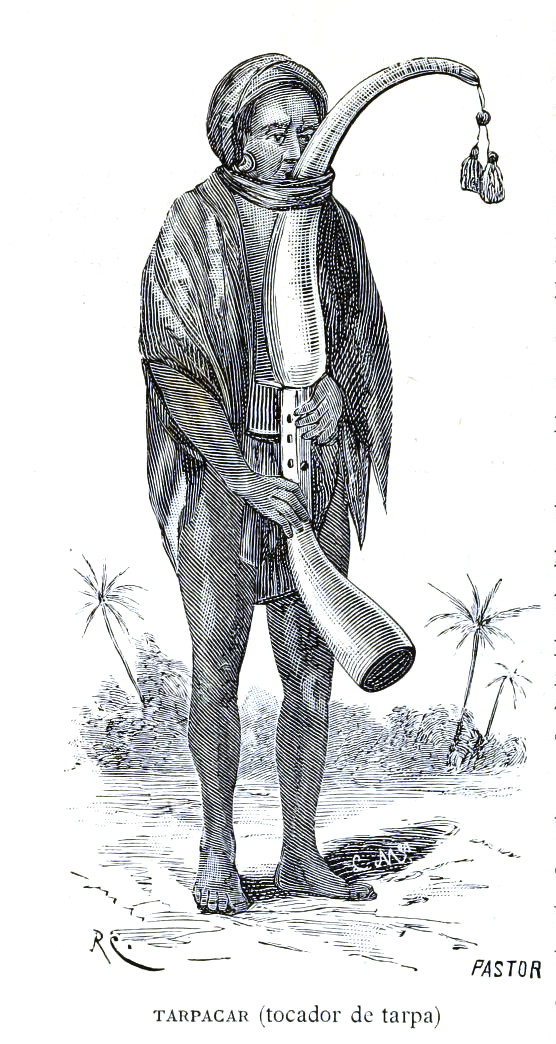
A tarpa player c.1885

These rudimentary wall paintings use a set of basic geometric shapes: a circle, a triangle, and a square and also a set of colours usually consisting of brown and white. These shapes are symbolic of different elements of nature. The circle and the triangle come from their observation of nature. The circle represents the sun and the moon, while the triangle depicts mountains and conical trees. In contrast, the square is rendered as a human invention, indicating a sacred enclosure or a piece of land. The central motif in each ritual painting is the square, known as the "chauk" or "chaukat", mostly of two types known as Devchauk and Lagnachauk. Inside a Devchauk is usually a depiction of palghat, the mother goddess, symbolizing fraternity.

Male gods are unusual among the Warli and are frequently related to spirits that have taken human shape. The central motif in the ritual painting is surrounded by scenes portraying hunting, fishing, farming, trees and animals. Festivals and dances are common scenes depicted in the ritual paintings. People and animals are represented by two inverse triangles joined at their tips: the upper triangle depicts the torso and the lower triangle the pelvis. Their precarious equilibrium symbolizes the balance of the universe. The representation also has the practical and amusing advantage of animating the bodies. Another main theme of Warli art is the denotation of a triangle that is larger at the top, representing a man; and a triangle which is wider at the bottom, representing a woman. Apart from ritualistic paintings, other Warli paintings covered day-to-day activities of the village people.

One of the central aspects depicted in many Warli paintings is the tarpa dance. The tarpa, a trumpet-like instrument, is played in turns by different village men. Men and women entwine their hands and move in a circle around the tarpa player. The dancers then follow him, turning and moving as he turns, never turning their backs to the tarpa. The musician plays two different notes, which direct the head dancer to either move clockwise or counterclockwise. The tarpa player assumes a role similar to that of a snake charmer, and the dancers become the figurative snake. The dancers take a long turn in the audience and try to encircle them for entertainment. The circle formation of the dancers is also said to resemble the circle of life.

=== Materials used ===
The simple pictorial language of Warli painting is matched by a rudimentary technique. The ritual paintings are usually created on the inside walls of village huts. The walls are made of a mixture of branches, earth and red brick that make a red ochre background for the paintings. The Warli only paint with a white pigment made from a mixture of rice flour and water, with gum as a binder. A bamboo stick is chewed at the end to give it the texture of a paintbrush. Walls are painted only to mark special occasions such as weddings, festivals or every thing harvests. They make it with a sense that it can be seen by future generations.

== Traditional knowledge and intellectual property ==
Warli Painting is traditional knowledge and cultural intellectual property preserved across generations. Understanding the urgent need for intellectual property rights, the tribal non-governmental organization Adivasi Yuva Seva Sangh helped to register Warli painting with a geographical indication under the intellectual property rights act. Various efforts are in progress for strengthening the sustainable economy of the Warli with social entrepreneurship.

== In contemporary culture ==
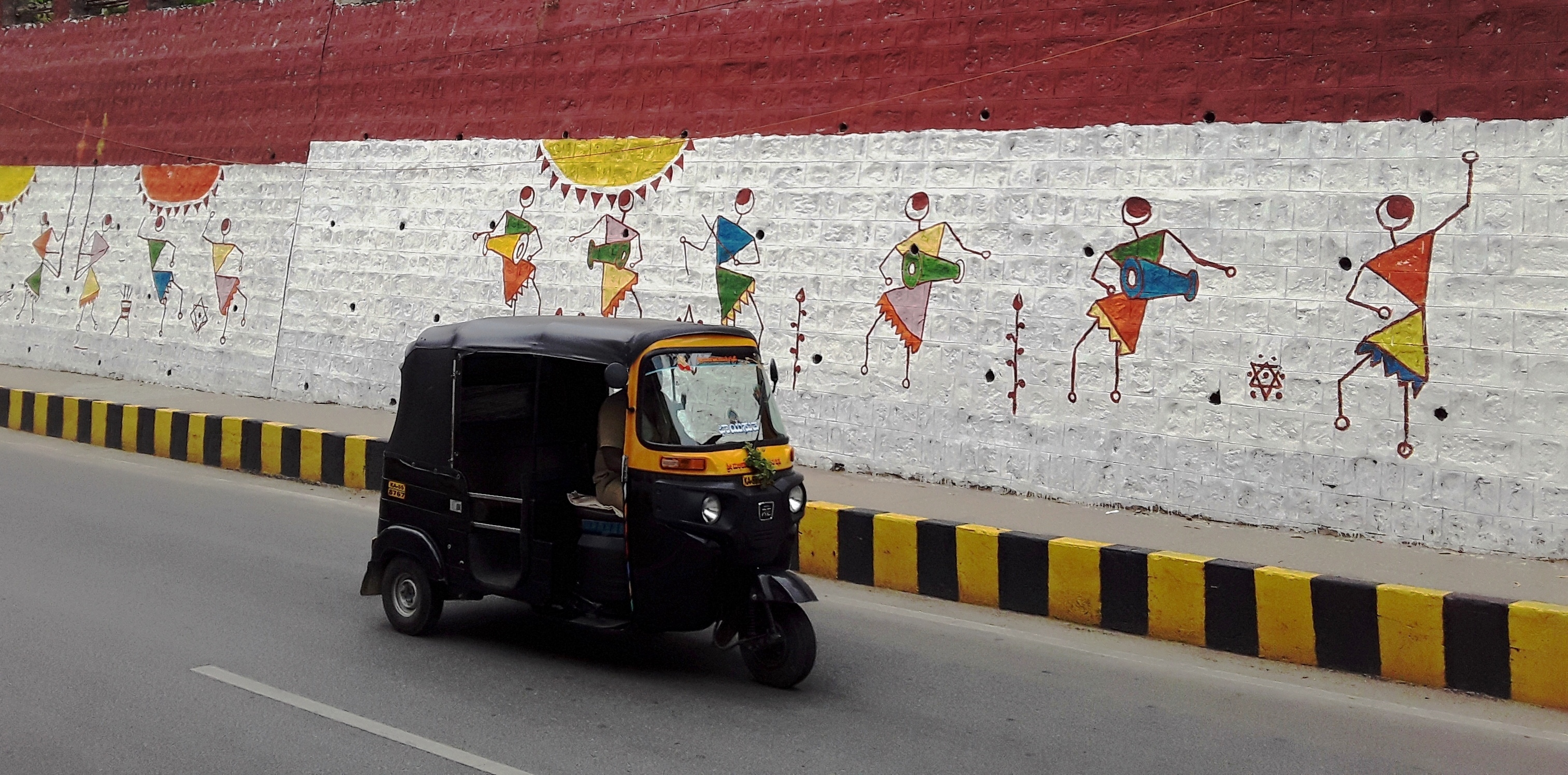
Warli Paintings in Mysore

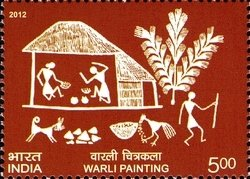
Stamp of India 2012 Warli Painting Maharashtra

The lack of regular artistic activity explains the traditional tribal sense of style for their paintings. In the 1970s, this ritual art took a radical turn when Jivya Soma Mashe and his son Balu Mashe started to paint. They painted not for ritual purposes, but because of their artistic pursuits. Jivya is known as the modern father of Warli painting. Since the 1970s, Warli painting has moved onto paper and canvas.

In 2016, Coca-Cola India launched a campaign called "Come Home on Deepawali", which featured Warli paintings. The campaign targeted the youth demographics. The campaign included advertising on traditional mass media, combined with radio, the Internet, and out-of-home media.

According to the India Book of Records, India's largest Warli art painting is hosted at the Manik Public School at Maniknagar, Karnataka. Warli artist Avanti Sandeep Kulkarni designed and hand-painted the sections of painting.

According to the India Book of Records, India's largest Warli painting by a group was done by the Indian Institute of Science Education and Research (IISER) Pune. Led by IISER's Art Club members—Dr Suhita Nadkarni, Lavanya Lokhande, Prachi Shinde, Divya Singh, and Siddhesh Zadey —the art piece spanned 2600 square feet, the size of a football field. A team of over 400 IISER students and staff members composed it within 14 hours.

== Bibliography ==
- Swaminathan, Mangalam (July–August 2003). "From Wall to Walls – the Warll paintings". Indira Gandhi National Centre for the Arts. Vihangama News Letter Vol. IV July–August 2003.
- Tribhuwan, Robin D.; Finkenauer, Maike (2003). "What About the Warli Painting Tradition?". Threads Together: A Comparative Study of Tribal and Pre-historic Rock Paintings. Discovery Publishing House. pp. 11–61. ISBN 9788171416448.
- Satyawadi, Sudha (2010). Unique Art of Warli Paintings. D. K. Printworld Pvt. Ltd. ISBN 978-8124605578.
- "Warli Painting". Living Traditions: Tribal and Folk Paintings of India. New Delhi: Centre for Cultural Resources and Training; Ministry of Culture, Government of India. 2017. pp. 27–32.
