= Ghimniye =

Village in Maharashtra

- village
- Location in Maharashtra, India Ghimniye (India)
- Coordinates: 20.1764881°N 72.8253754°E
- Country: India
- State: Maharashtra
- District: Palghar
- Taluka: Talasari
- Elevation: 22 m (72 ft)

Population (2011)
  - Total: 3,722
- Time zone: UTC+5:30 (IST)
- 2011 census code: 551542

Ghimniye is a village in the Palghar district of Maharashtra, India. It is located in Talasari taluka.

== Geography ==
The village of Ghimniye is located in the state of Maharashtra in western India, and it is part of the rural areas situated on the Deccan Plateau. Administratively, it falls within one of the inland districts of the state, where small agricultural villages are widespread.

== Demographics ==
According to the 2011 census of India, Ghimniye has 698 households. The effective literacy rate (i.e. the literacy rate of population excluding children aged 6 and below) is 53.87%.

Demographics (2011 Census)
	Total	Male	Female
Population	3722	1849	1873
Children aged below 6 years	622	298	324
Scheduled caste	6	5	1
Scheduled tribe	3554	1738	1816
Literates	1670	1000	670
Workers (all)	1563	979	584
Main workers (total)	1158	841	317
Main workers: Cultivators	220	190	30
Main workers: Agricultural labourers	82	53	29
Main workers: Household industry workers	21	18	3
Main workers: Other	835	580	255
Marginal workers (total)	405	138	267
Marginal workers: Cultivators	193	36	157
Marginal workers: Agricultural labourers	67	30	37
Marginal workers: Household industry workers	5	0	5
Marginal workers: Others	140	72	68
Non-workers	2159	870	1289
