= Jivya Soma Mashe =

Indian artist (1934–2018)

Shilp Guru Jivya Mashe
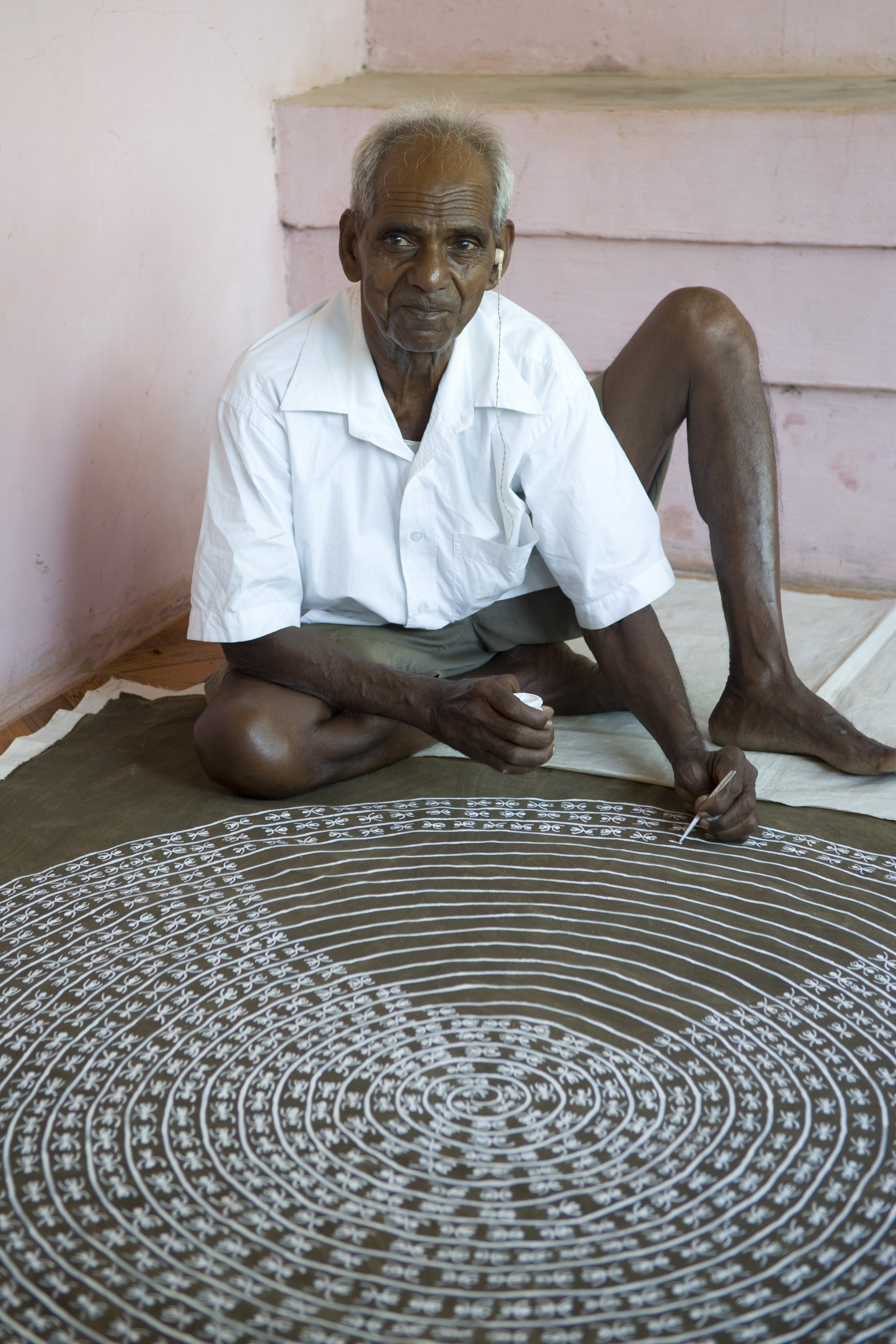
- Jivya Mashe painting
- Born: Jivya Soma Mashe; 1934; Dhamangaon, Bombay Presidency, British India
- Died: 15 May 2018 (aged 83–84); Dahanu, Maharashtra, India
- Known for: Warli painting
- Style: Visual art
- Children: 3
- Awards: National Award for the Tribal Art (1976); Shilp Guru (2002); Prince Claus Award (2009); Padma Shri (2011)

Jivya Soma Mashe (ISO: Jivyā Somā Mhāsē; 1934 – 15 May 2018) was an artist of the Maharashtra state in India, who popularised the Warli tribal art form.

Mashe was born in Dhamangaon village in Talasari taluka of Thane district (now Palghar district) of Maharashtra. At the age of 11, he came to Kalambipada village in Dahanu taluka of Thane district. In the 1970s the Warli painting, which was a predominantly ritual art till that time, took a radical turn, when Jivya Mashe started to paint not for any special ritual, but on an everyday basis.

His talent was soon noticed, first nationally (it was rewarded straight from the hand of India's senior political figures, such as Jawaharlal Nehru and Indira Gandhi) then internationally (Magiciens de la terre, Centre Pompidou), bringing unprecedented recognition, which prompted many other young men to follow suit. They started to paint regularly for commercial purposes.

== Life ==
Jivya Soma Mashe lost his mother when seven years old; out of shock he stopped speaking for several years, communicating only by drawing pictures in the dust. This strange attitude soon won him a special status within his community.

The first government agents sent to preserve and protect Warli painting were impressed by his artistic abilities. Jivya Soma Mashe showed a heightened sensitivity and unusually powerful imagination, which it was conjectured was a legacy of his early introspective period. Paper and canvas freed him from the constraints of working on rough, sheer walls and he transformed the brusque look of the ephemeral paintings into a free, deeply sensitive style. His sensitivity emerged in every detail of his paintings. Strokes, lines and a mass of dots swarm and vibrate on the canvas, coming together to form clever compositions which reinforce the general impression of vibration. Details and the overall composition both contribute to a sense of life and movement. Recurring themes, from tribal life and Warli legends, are also a pretext for celebrating life and movement.

Jivya Soma Mashe summed up the deep feeling which animates the Warli people, saying "There are human beings, birds, animals, insects, and so on. Everything moves, day and night. Life is movement".

The Warli, adivasi, or the indigenous peoples, speak to us of ancient times and evoke an ancestral culture. An in-depth study of this culture may give further insight into the cultural and religious foundations of modern India. He died aged 84 on 15 May 2018 and was accorded a state funeral.

Jivya has two sons Sadashiv and Balu and a daughter. His elder son, Sadashiv was born in 1958. Both of his sons are well known exponents of this art form.

== Exhibitions ==
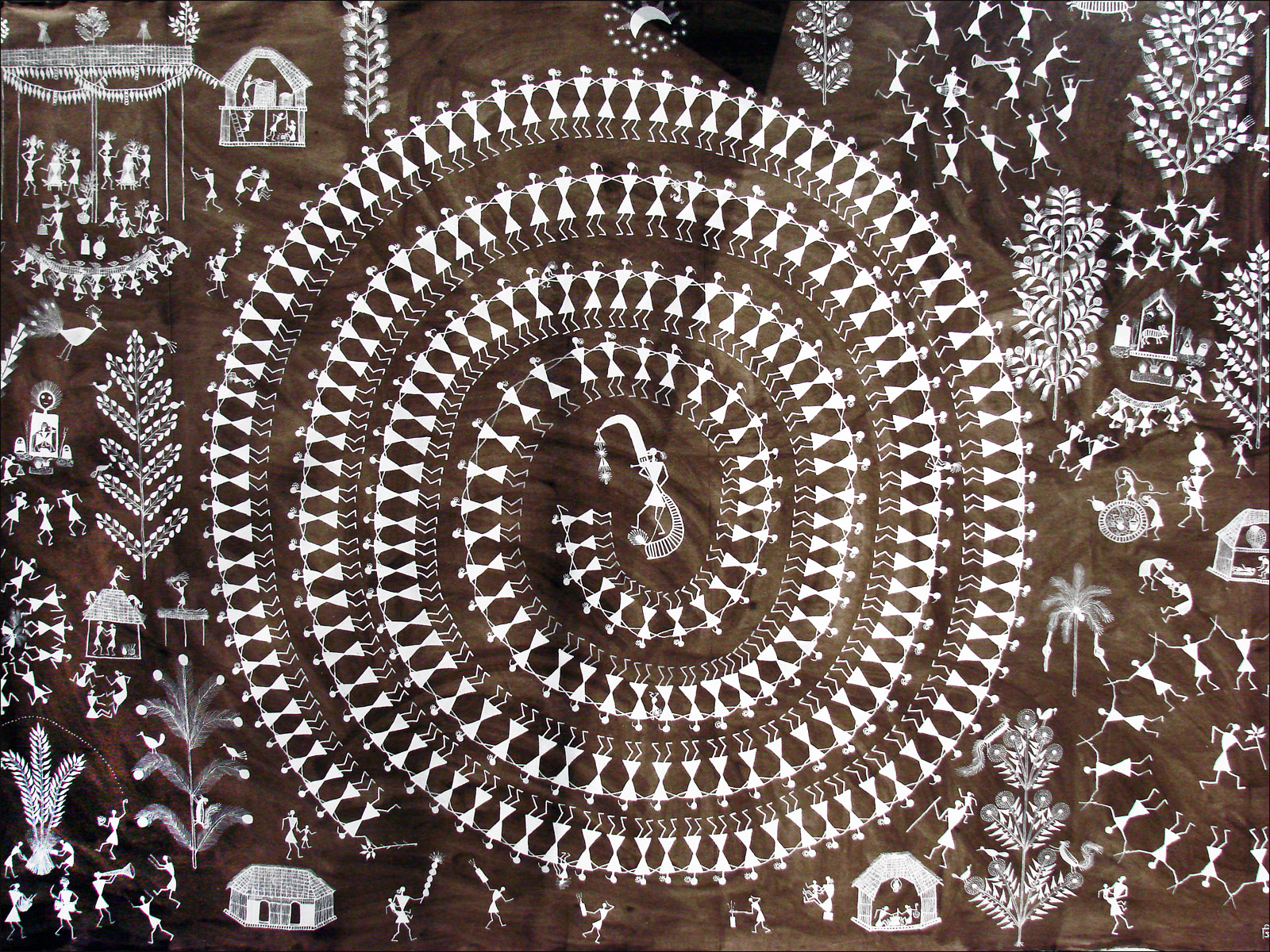
A Warli painting by Jivya Soma Mashe

The first exhibition of Jivya was held at the Gallery Chemould, Jehangir Art Gallery in Mumbai in 1975 by the initiative of Bhaskar Kulkarni, who first introduced this master to the outside world. His first exhibition outside India was at the Palais de Menton, France in 1976. In 2003, he had a joint exhibition with Richard Long at Museum Kunst Palast in Düsseldorf, Germany, and in 2004 at Padiglione d'Arte Contemporanea, Milano, Italy. These were followed by the exhibitions at Shippensburg University, United States in 2006 and at Halle Saint-Pierre, Paris (jointly with Nek Chand) in 2007. In July, 2007 another exhibition of his paintings was held at the Gallery Chemould, Mumbai.

== Awards and honours ==
- National Award for the Tribal Art (1976)
- Shilp Guru award (2002).
- Prince Claus Award for his Warli paintings (2009).
- Padma Shri by the Government of India for his contribution towards Warli painting (2011).

== See also ==
- Warli Painting
- Adivasi
- Indian art
- List of Scheduled Tribes in India
- Bagh Print
