= Varwade =

Village in Maharashtra

- village
- Location in Maharashtra, India Varwade (India)
- Coordinates: 20.1743203°N 72.8929°E
- Country: India
- State: Maharashtra
- District: Palghar
- Taluka: Talasari
- Elevation: 68 m (223 ft)

Population (2011)
  - Total: 5,877
- Time zone: UTC+5:30 (IST)
- 2011 census code: 551547

Varwade is a village in the Palghar district of Maharashtra, India. It is located in the Talasari taluka.

== Demographics ==
According to the 2011 census of India, Varwade has 951 households. The effective literacy rate (i.e. the literacy rate of population excluding children aged 6 and below) is 56.18%.

Demographics (2011 Census)
	Total	Male	Female
Population	5877	2676	3201
Children aged below 6 years	1034	514	520
Scheduled caste	8	4	4
Scheduled tribe	5811	2643	3168
Literates	2721	1422	1299
Workers (all)	2287	1233	1054
Main workers (total)	1135	699	436
Main workers: Cultivators	470	240	230
Main workers: Agricultural labourers	102	61	41
Main workers: Household industry workers	10	7	3
Main workers: Other	553	391	162
Marginal workers (total)	1152	534	618
Marginal workers: Cultivators	353	145	208
Marginal workers: Agricultural labourers	501	193	308
Marginal workers: Household industry workers	15	4	11
Marginal workers: Others	283	192	91
Non-workers	3590	1443	2147
