= Udhawa =

Village in Maharashtra

- village
- Location in Maharashtra, India Udhawa (India)
- Coordinates: 20.0958326°N 73.0021534°E
- Country: India
- State: Maharashtra
- District: Palghar
- Taluka: Talasari
- Elevation: 69 m (226 ft)

Population (2011)
  - Total: 3,026
- Time zone: UTC+5:30 (IST)
- 2011 census code: 551575

Udhawa is a village in the Palghar district of Maharashtra, India. It is located in the Talasari taluka.

== Demographics ==
According to the 2011 census of India, Udhawa had 604 households. The effective literacy rate (i.e. the literacy rate of population excluding children aged 6 and below) was 71.53%.

Demographics (2011 Census)
	Total	Male	Female
Population	3026	1547	1479
Children aged below 6 years	458	239	219
Scheduled caste	255	119	136
Scheduled tribe	1379	676	703
Literates	1837	1066	771
Workers (all)	1073	788	285
Main workers (total)	1010	762	248
Main workers: Cultivators	280	206	74
Main workers: Agricultural labourers	87	40	47
Main workers: Household industry workers	75	55	20
Main workers: Other	568	461	107
Marginal workers (total)	63	26	37
Marginal workers: Cultivators	19	7	12
Marginal workers: Agricultural labourers	19	12	7
Marginal workers: Household industry workers	15	5	10
Marginal workers: Others	10	2	8
Non-workers	1953	759	1194
