= Masanpada =

Village in Maharashtra

- village
- Location in Maharashtra, India Masanpada (India)
- Coordinates: 20.1943091°N 72.9490094°E
- Country: India
- State: Maharashtra
- District: Palghar
- Taluka: Talasari
- Elevation: 45 m (148 ft)

Population (2011)
  - Total: 1,264
- Time zone: UTC+5:30 (IST)
- 2011 census code: 551536

Masanpada is a village in the Palghar district of Maharashtra, India. It is located in the Talasari taluka.

== Demographics ==
According to the 2011 census of India, Masanpada has 241 households. The effective literacy rate (i.e. the literacy rate of population excluding children aged 6 and below) is 49.67%.

Demographics (2011 Census)
	Total	Male	Female
Population	1264	619	645
Children aged below 6 years	211	103	108
Scheduled caste	0	0	0
Scheduled tribe	1239	604	635
Literates	523	344	179
Workers (all)	485	271	214
Main workers (total)	263	216	47
Main workers: Cultivators	54	53	1
Main workers: Agricultural labourers	14	13	1
Main workers: Household industry workers	18	12	6
Main workers: Other	177	138	39
Marginal workers (total)	222	55	167
Marginal workers: Cultivators	22	21	1
Marginal workers: Agricultural labourers	168	6	162
Marginal workers: Household industry workers	1	1	0
Marginal workers: Others	31	27	4
Non-workers	779	348	431
