= Sagarshet =

Village in Maharashtra

- village
- Location in Maharashtra, India Sagarshet (India)
- Coordinates: 20.0831414°N 72.9903447°E
- Country: India
- State: Maharashtra
- District: Palghar
- Taluka: Talasari
- Elevation: 80 m (260 ft)

Population (2011)
  - Total: 3,931
- Time zone: UTC+5:30 (IST)
- 2011 census code: 551576

Sagarshet is a village in the Palghar district of Maharashtra, India. It is located in the Talasari taluka.

== Demographics ==
According to the 2011 census of India, Sagarshet has 684 households. The effective literacy rate (i.e. the literacy rate of population excluding children aged 6 and below) is 54.66%.

Demographics (2011 Census)
	Total	Male	Female
Population	3931	1939	1992
Children aged below 6 years	691	361	330
Scheduled caste	0	0	0
Scheduled tribe	3896	1922	1974
Literates	1771	1086	685
Workers (all)	1584	869	715
Main workers (total)	751	551	200
Main workers: Cultivators	152	121	31
Main workers: Agricultural labourers	335	217	118
Main workers: Household industry workers	13	6	7
Main workers: Other	251	207	44
Marginal workers (total)	833	318	515
Marginal workers: Cultivators	91	30	61
Marginal workers: Agricultural labourers	645	225	420
Marginal workers: Household industry workers	4	3	1
Marginal workers: Others	93	60	33
Non-workers	2347	1070	1277
