= Tarpa (instrument) =

Tribal instrument from Western India

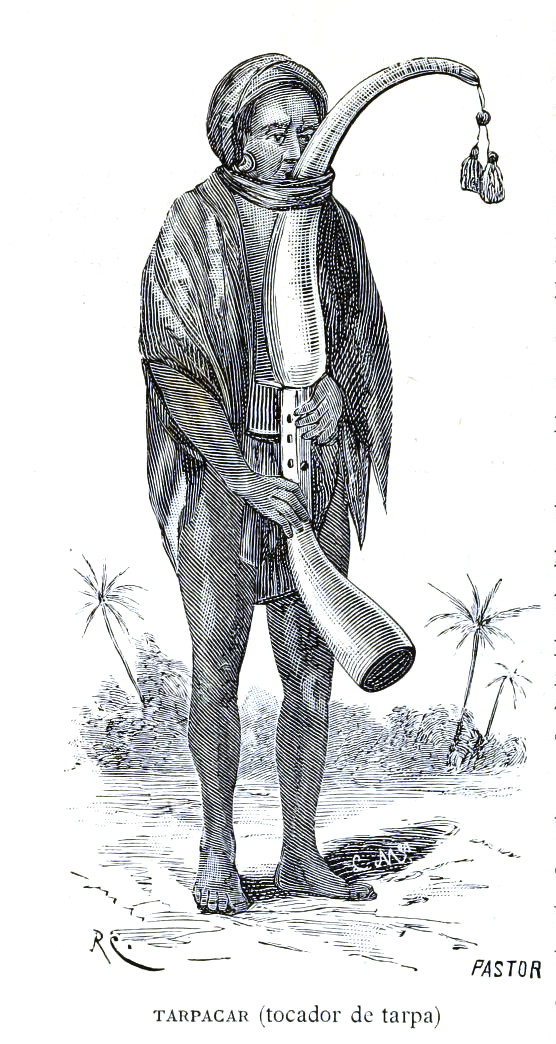
A traditional Tarpa player

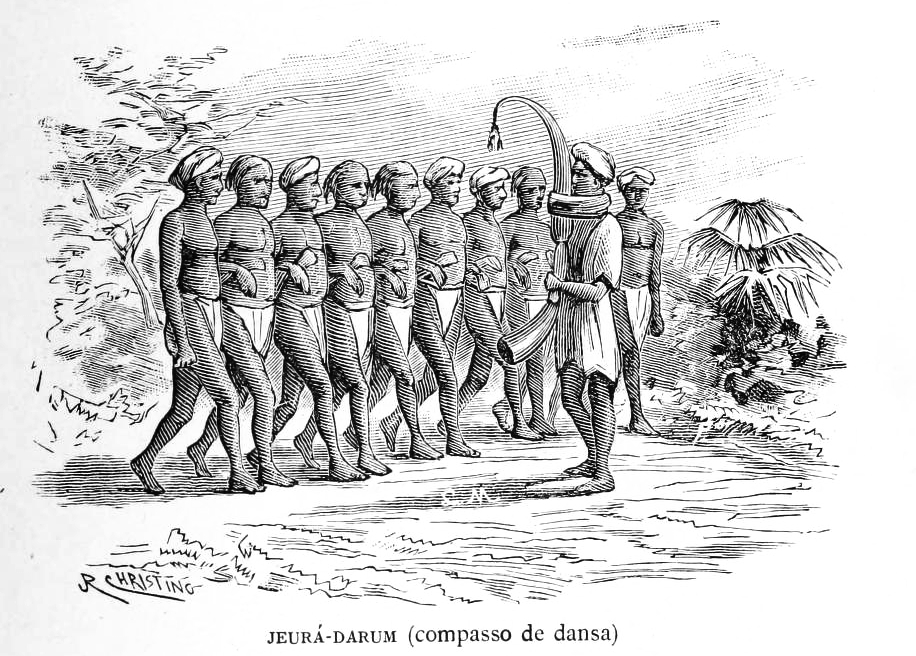
Tarpa player teaching locals the Tarpa dance

Tarpa (Marathi: तारपा) is a tribal instrument originating from Western India. It is a wind instrument, played by blowing into a reservoir chamber that is connected to two bamboo pipes which are attached to a resonating chamber. The makers and players of this instrument primarily belong to the Warli tribe of Maharashtra and Gujarat. The Tarpa, alongside the Dhol is the primary instrument played at Warli gatherings and festivities. Other associated aspects of Warli life and culture pay heed to the Tarpa playing a significant role for the community- the dance form performed with the music of the instrument, is also referred to as Tarpa-dance, and the Tarpa event is a prominent motif featured in Warli paintings.

== Construction ==
In its construction, the Tarpa is a Single-reed instrument with two pipes possessing free-beating reeds (in principle similar to the Pungi or the Hulusi). The structure of the instrument can be divided into three parts - the reservoir chamber or a wind chest with a mouth-blowing hole, the bamboo pipes with holes for controlling pitch, and the resonant horn chamber with a hole for amplifying the sound. Its size ranges between 2 and 6 feet. The size of the instrument may vary depending on the sizes of the components used in its making. The primary components of this instrument are dried bottle gourd, bamboo, bee's wax (which is used as an adhesive and sealant) and dried toddy leaves. The free reed in the Tarpa is made out of bamboo and is connected to two bamboo pipes which have three finger holes that change the pitch as well as an air duct on the top-end of one pipe which is used as a cross-fingering stop. A dried up bottle gourd is attached to the reed, with the bamboo pipes extending out of one end of the gourd. This attachment is joined using beeswax. The open end of the bottle gourd acts as the mouthpiece into which the player blows air. Often, this gourd is ornamented with paint and feathers. Opposite to the bottle-gourd, the other ends of the bamboo pipes are attached with a horn-like resonator made out of dried coconut leaves. These leaves are folded to form a chamber around the axis of the two bamboo pipes. This horn is also often painted and decorated. The resonator chamber can also have an additional bamboo reed suspended on its inner surface using a cloth string. The instrument is entirely hand-made, without using mechanical implements, and constructed using organic forest produce of the region.

=== Technique and Sound ===
The Tarpa has two bamboo pipes that are played vertically and create a sound based on the air-columns in the bamboo, similar to a vertical flute. The two bamboo pipes are colloquially referred to as the "male" and "female" sounds to indicate the difference in octave. Both pipes can be used to play either the drone or the melody. The player blows air through the top gourd tube, typically this portion is tied to the player's head to secure the instrument. The air flows into both pipes and the player can control which voice plays the melody between the two bamboos. The combination of the drone with a free melody across octaves on top produces a texture similar to bagpipes. Typically, the Tarpa is played solo and the performer establishes the rhythm as per the composition's and dance's requirement, in conjunction with the dancers beating sticks. As it is a solo drone-based instrument, controlled circular breathing is required to play the instrument.

== Tarpa in Warli Culture ==
In Warli Culture, Tarpa is believed to have been given to the tribe by Warli God, Naran. Often in marriage ceremonies, the Tarpa is played along with the Dhol. The period of the year during which the instrument is traditionally prescribed to be performed is said to lie between the harvest in September and the festival of Diwali (in October or November). The restrictions against its performance is not thoroughly discussed, and other literature mentions the performance of Tarpa during Holi and other auspicious occasions. The musician is said to perform compositions that bring blessings to village crop harvest and usher peace and joy amongst the members of the tribe. Sometimes even non-tribal residents of the village patronize the Tarpa performance to symbolically consecrate the field for healthy crops. As an event, the music and dance performance centered around this instrument is said to start around sunset and progress through the night into dawn.

At a semiotic level, this instrument is a widely used symbol in Warli paintings, which are the most popularly commercialized products of Warli people. The motif of the Tarpa player in the center of a circle of men and women clasping and dancing is showcased on many examples of Warli paintings. Parallelly, the Tarpa motif also acts as a representative of Warli culture in popular media.

== See also ==
- Tribal art
- Pungi
- Saxophone
