= Sawane =

Village in Maharashtra

- village
- Location in Maharashtra, India Sawane (India)
- Coordinates: 20.0944889°N 72.8722249°E
- Country: India
- State: Maharashtra
- District: Palghar
- Taluka: Talasari
- Elevation: 41 m (135 ft)

Population (2011)
  - Total: 3,008
- Time zone: UTC+5:30 (IST)
- 2011 census code: 551569

Sawane is a village in the Palghar district of Maharashtra, India. It is located in the Talasari taluka.

== Demographics ==
According to the 2011 census of India, Sawane has 432 households. The effective literacy rate (i.e. the literacy rate of population excluding children aged 6 and below) is 49.7%.

Demographics (2011 Census)
	Total	Male	Female
Population	3008	1652	1356
Children aged below 6 years	543	247	296
Scheduled caste	0	0	0
Scheduled tribe	2967	1630	1337
Literates	1225	937	288
Workers (all)	1102	621	481
Main workers (total)	662	485	177
Main workers: Cultivators	264	241	23
Main workers: Agricultural labourers	211	85	126
Main workers: Household industry workers	12	9	3
Main workers: Other	175	150	25
Marginal workers (total)	440	136	304
Marginal workers: Cultivators	75	56	19
Marginal workers: Agricultural labourers	287	44	243
Marginal workers: Household industry workers	8	0	8
Marginal workers: Others	70	36	34
Non-workers	1906	1031	875
