= Sawroli =

Village in Maharashtra

- village
- Location in Maharashtra, India Sawroli (India)
- Coordinates: 20.1651485°N 72.9165266°E
- Country: India
- State: Maharashtra
- District: Palghar
- Taluka: Talasari
- Elevation: 58 m (190 ft)

Population (2011)
  - Total: 3,341
- Time zone: UTC+5:30 (IST)
- 2011 census code: 551548

Sawroli is a village in the Palghar district of Maharashtra, India. It is located in the Talasari taluka.

== Demographics ==
According to the 2011 census of India, Sawroli has 611 households. The effective literacy rate (i.e. the literacy rate of population excluding children aged 6 and below) is 65.55%.

Demographics (2011 Census)
	Total	Male	Female
Population	3341	1667	1674
Children aged below 6 years	586	289	297
Scheduled caste	0	0	0
Scheduled tribe	3321	1656	1665
Literates	1806	1088	718
Workers (all)	1658	854	804
Main workers (total)	746	426	320
Main workers: Cultivators	416	218	198
Main workers: Agricultural labourers	135	50	85
Main workers: Household industry workers	9	6	3
Main workers: Other	186	152	34
Marginal workers (total)	912	428	484
Marginal workers: Cultivators	132	100	32
Marginal workers: Agricultural labourers	618	210	408
Marginal workers: Household industry workers	27	15	12
Marginal workers: Others	135	103	32
Non-workers	1683	813	870
