= Amagaon, Palghar =

Village in Maharashtra

Amagaon
- village
- Location in Maharashtra, India Amagaon (India)
- Coordinates: 20.1872517°N 72.8781322°E
- Country: India
- State: Maharashtra
- District: Palghar
- Taluka: Talasari
- Elevation: 39 m (128 ft)

Population (2011)
  - Total: 2,185
- Time zone: UTC+5:30 (IST)
- 2011 census code: 551540

Amagaon is a village in the Palghar district of Maharashtra, India. It is located in the Talasari taluka.

== Demographics ==
According to the 2011 census of India, Amagaon has 403 households. The effective literacy rate (i.e. the literacy rate of population excluding children aged 6 and below) is 58.57%.

Demographics (2011 Census)
	Total	Male	Female
Population	2185	1074	1111
Children aged below 6 years	365	169	196
Scheduled caste	5	3	2
Scheduled tribe	2132	1042	1090
Literates	1066	633	433
Workers (all)	1137	585	552
Main workers (total)	717	468	249
Main workers: Cultivators	227	157	70
Main workers: Agricultural labourers	189	82	107
Main workers: Household industry workers	16	7	9
Main workers: Other	285	222	63
Marginal workers (total)	420	117	303
Marginal workers: Cultivators	165	39	126
Marginal workers: Agricultural labourers	123	20	103
Marginal workers: Household industry workers	1	0	1
Marginal workers: Others	131	58	73
Non-workers	1048	489	559
