= Achchhad =

Village in Maharashtra

Achchhad Achchad, Achad
- village
- Location in Maharashtra, India Achchhad (India)
- Coordinates: 20.2180547°N 72.8692711°E
- Country: India
- State: Maharashtra
- District: Palghar
- Taluka: Talasari
- Elevation: 42 m (138 ft)

Population (2011)
  - Total: 2,770
- Time zone: UTC+5:30 (IST)
- 2011 census code: 551532

Achchhad is a village in the Palghar district of Maharashtra, India. It is located in the Talasari taluka.

== Demographics ==
According to the 2011 census of India, Achchhad has 599 households. The effective literacy rate (i.e. the literacy rate of population excluding children aged 6 and below) is 63.93%.

Demographics (2011 Census)
	Total	Male	Female
Population	2770	1355	1415
Children aged below 6 years	447	233	214
Scheduled caste	12	6	6
Scheduled tribe	2213	1048	1165
Literates	1485	847	638
Workers (all)	1058	691	367
Main workers (total)	808	582	226
Main workers: Cultivators	125	113	12
Main workers: Agricultural labourers	129	36	93
Main workers: Household industry workers	16	8	8
Main workers: Other	538	425	113
Marginal workers (total)	250	109	141
Marginal workers: Cultivators	68	34	34
Marginal workers: Agricultural labourers	57	12	45
Marginal workers: Household industry workers	1	1	0
Marginal workers: Others	124	62	62
Non-workers	1712	664	1048
