= Awarpada =

Village in Maharashtra

- village
- Location in Maharashtra, India Awarpada (India)
- Coordinates: 20.1286411°N 72.8825627°E
- Country: India
- State: Maharashtra
- District: Palghar
- Taluka: Talasari
- Elevation: 52 m (171 ft)

Population (2011)
  - Total: 1,562
- Time zone: UTC+5:30 (IST)
- 2011 census code: 551565

Awarpada is a village in the Palghar district of Maharashtra, India. It is located in the Talasari taluka.

== Demographics ==
According to the 2011 census of India, Awarpada has 275 households. The effective literacy rate (i.e. the literacy rate of population excluding children aged 6 and below) is 43.09%.

Demographics (2011 Census)
| | Total | Male | Female |
|---|---|---|---|
| Population | 1562 | 767 | 795 |
| Children aged below 6 years | 281 | 138 | 143 |
| Scheduled caste | 540 | 271 | 269 |
| Scheduled tribe | 1018 | 495 | 523 |
| Literates | 552 | 341 | 211 |
| Workers (all) | 593 | 412 | 181 |
| Main workers (total) | 168 | 141 | 27 |
| Main workers: Cultivators | 20 | 13 | 7 |
| Main workers: Agricultural labourers | 86 | 76 | 10 |
| Main workers: Household industry workers | 2 | 1 | 1 |
| Main workers: Other | 60 | 51 | 9 |
| Marginal workers (total) | 425 | 271 | 154 |
| Marginal workers: Cultivators | 257 | 131 | 126 |
| Marginal workers: Agricultural labourers | 131 | 109 | 22 |
| Marginal workers: Household industry workers | 3 | 3 | 0 |
| Marginal workers: Others | 34 | 28 | 6 |
| Non-workers | 969 | 355 | 614 |
