= Ambeshetgaon =

Village in Maharashtra

- village
- Location in Maharashtra, India Ambeshetgaon (India)
- Coordinates: 20.2092479°N 72.925386°E
- Country: India
- State: Maharashtra
- District: Palghar
- Taluka: Talasari
- Elevation: 34 m (112 ft)

Population (2011)
  - Total: 1,114
- Time zone: UTC+5:30 (IST)
- 2011 census code: 551537

Ambeshetgaon is a village in the Palghar district of Maharashtra, India. It is located in the Talasari taluka.

== Demographics ==
According to the 2011 census of India, Ambeshetgaon has 163 households. The effective literacy rate (i.e. the literacy rate of population excluding children aged 6 and below) is 63.49%.

Demographics (2011 Census)
	Total	Male	Female
Population	1114	590	524
Children aged below 6 years	158	85	73
Scheduled caste	0	0	0
Scheduled tribe	1113	589	524
Literates	607	388	219
Workers (all)	349	210	139
Main workers (total)	262	169	93
Main workers: Cultivators	152	100	52
Main workers: Agricultural labourers	20	11	9
Main workers: Household industry workers	1	0	1
Main workers: Other	89	58	31
Marginal workers (total)	87	41	46
Marginal workers: Cultivators	21	5	16
Marginal workers: Agricultural labourers	22	5	17
Marginal workers: Household industry workers	0	0	0
Marginal workers: Others	44	31	13
Non-workers	765	380	385
