= Kochai, Palghar =

Village in Maharashtra

Kochai
- village
- Location in Maharashtra, India Kochai (India)
- Coordinates: 20.1919601°N 72.925386°E
- Country: India
- State: Maharashtra
- District: Palghar
- Taluka: Talasari
- Elevation: 41 m (135 ft)

Population (2011)
  - Total: 3,539
- Time zone: UTC+5:30 (IST)
- 2011 census code: 551538

Kochai is a village in the Palghar district of Maharashtra, India. It is located in the Talasari taluka.

== Demographics ==
According to the 2011 census of India, Kochai has 602 households. The effective literacy rate (i.e. the literacy rate of population excluding children aged 6 and below) is 53.86%.

Demographics (2011 Census)
	Total	Male	Female
Population	3539	1703	1836
Children aged below 6 years	715	352	363
Scheduled caste	0	0	0
Scheduled tribe	3499	1680	1819
Literates	1521	917	604
Workers (all)	1615	823	792
Main workers (total)	584	415	169
Main workers: Cultivators	340	229	111
Main workers: Agricultural labourers	50	29	21
Main workers: Household industry workers	2	2	0
Main workers: Other	192	155	37
Marginal workers (total)	1031	408	623
Marginal workers: Cultivators	158	78	80
Marginal workers: Agricultural labourers	782	262	520
Marginal workers: Household industry workers	14	8	6
Marginal workers: Others	77	60	17
Non-workers	1924	880	1044
