= Kawade =

Village in Maharashtra

- village
- Location in Maharashtra, India Kawade (India)
- Coordinates: 20.1155322°N 72.8810859°E
- Country: India
- State: Maharashtra
- District: Palghar
- Taluka: Talasari
- Elevation: 47 m (154 ft)

Population (2011)
  - Total: 3,127
- Time zone: UTC+5:30 (IST)
- 2011 census code: 551568

Kawade is a village in the Palghar district of Maharashtra, India. It is located in the Talasari taluka.

== Demographics ==
According to the 2011 census of India, Kawade has 536 households. The effective literacy rate (i.e. the literacy rate of population excluding children aged 6 and below) is 41.56%.

Demographics (2011 Census)
	Total	Male	Female
Population	3127	1495	1632
Children aged below 6 years	591	290	301
Scheduled caste	0	0	0
Scheduled tribe	3116	1489	1627
Literates	1054	661	393
Workers (all)	1428	784	644
Main workers (total)	1327	696	631
Main workers: Cultivators	1122	597	525
Main workers: Agricultural labourers	89	16	73
Main workers: Household industry workers	1	0	1
Main workers: Other	115	83	32
Marginal workers (total)	101	88	13
Marginal workers: Cultivators	8	7	1
Marginal workers: Agricultural labourers	34	32	2
Marginal workers: Household industry workers	0	0	0
Marginal workers: Others	59	49	10
Non-workers	1699	711	988
