= Upalat =

Village in Maharashtra

- village
- Location in Maharashtra, India Upalat (India)
- Coordinates: 20.198545°N 72.9047136°E
- Country: India
- State: Maharashtra
- District: Palghar
- Taluka: Talasari
- Elevation: 44 m (144 ft)

Population (2011)
  - Total: 10,893
- Time zone: UTC+5:30 (IST)
- 2011 census code: 551534

Upalat is a village in the Palghar district of Maharashtra, India. It is located in the Talasari taluka.

== Demographics ==
According to the 2011 census of India, Upalat has 1880 households. The effective literacy rate (i.e. the literacy rate of population excluding children aged 6 and below) is 60.51%.

Demographics (2011 Census)
	Total	Male	Female
Population	10893	5446	5447
Children aged below 6 years	1785	881	904
Scheduled caste	100	54	46
Scheduled tribe	10365	5170	5195
Literates	5511	3379	2132
Workers (all)	4661	2592	2069
Main workers (total)	3071	1859	1212
Main workers: Cultivators	1330	799	531
Main workers: Agricultural labourers	580	276	304
Main workers: Household industry workers	109	31	78
Main workers: Other	1052	753	299
Marginal workers (total)	1590	733	857
Marginal workers: Cultivators	413	178	235
Marginal workers: Agricultural labourers	651	270	381
Marginal workers: Household industry workers	128	48	80
Marginal workers: Others	398	237	161
Non-workers	6232	2854	3378
