= Kodad, Palghar =

Village in Maharashtra

Kodad
- village
- Location in Maharashtra, India Kodad (India)
- Coordinates: 20.1304137°N 73.0021534°E
- Country: India
- State: Maharashtra
- District: Palghar
- Taluka: Talasari
- Elevation: 61 m (200 ft)

Population (2011)
  - Total: 1,819
- Time zone: UTC+5:30 (IST)
- 2011 census code: 551574

Kodad is a village in the Palghar district of Maharashtra, India. It is located in the Talasari taluka.

== Demographics ==
According to the 2011 census of India, Kodad has 357 households. The effective literacy rate (i.e. the literacy rate of population excluding children aged 6 and below) is 53.24%.

Demographics (2011 Census)
	Total	Male	Female
Population	1819	869	950
Children aged below 6 years	292	143	149
Scheduled caste	417	199	218
Scheduled tribe	1396	666	730
Literates	813	485	328
Workers (all)	1032	488	544
Main workers (total)	471	240	231
Main workers: Cultivators	380	202	178
Main workers: Agricultural labourers	37	11	26
Main workers: Household industry workers	5	2	3
Main workers: Other	49	25	24
Marginal workers (total)	561	248	313
Marginal workers: Cultivators	481	212	269
Marginal workers: Agricultural labourers	34	12	22
Marginal workers: Household industry workers	0	0	0
Marginal workers: Others	46	24	22
Non-workers	787	381	406
