= Dolharpada =

Village in Maharashtra

- village
- Location in Maharashtra, India Dolharpada (India)
- Coordinates: 20.154319°N 72.8367776°E
- Country: India
- State: Maharashtra
- District: Palghar
- Taluka: Talasari
- Elevation: 52 m (171 ft)

Population (2011)
  - Total: 3,588
- Time zone: UTC+5:30 (IST)
- 2011 census code: 551544

Dolharpada is a village in the Palghar district of Maharashtra, India. It is located in the Talasari taluka.

== Demographics ==
According to the 2011 census of India, Dolharpada has 592 households. The effective literacy rate (i.e. the literacy rate of population excluding children aged 6 and below) is 59.19%.

Demographics (2011 Census)
	Total	Male	Female
Population	3588	1738	1850
Children aged below 6 years	645	316	329
Scheduled caste	0	0	0
Scheduled tribe	3573	1732	1841
Literates	1742	1020	722
Workers (all)	1575	742	833
Main workers (total)	820	389	431
Main workers: Cultivators	171	121	50
Main workers: Agricultural labourers	437	147	290
Main workers: Household industry workers	25	9	16
Main workers: Other	187	112	75
Marginal workers (total)	755	353	402
Marginal workers: Cultivators	331	175	156
Marginal workers: Agricultural labourers	256	101	155
Marginal workers: Household industry workers	25	4	21
Marginal workers: Others	143	73	70
Non-workers	2013	996	1017
