= Girgaon, Palghar =

Village in Maharashtra, India

Girgaon
- village
- Location in Maharashtra, India Location in India
- Coordinates: 20.164658°N 72.8249607°E
- Country: India
- State: Maharashtra
- District: Palghar
- Taluka: Talasari
- Elevation: 17 m (56 ft)

Population (2011)
  - Total: 2,735
- Time zone: UTC+5:30 (IST)
- 2011 census code: 551543

Girgaon is a village in the Palghar district of Maharashtra, India. It is located in the Talasari taluka.

== Demographics ==
According to the 2011 census of India, Girgaon has 523 households. The effective literacy rate (i.e. the literacy rate of population excluding children aged 6 and below) is 59.26%.

Demographics (2011 Census)
| | Total | Male | Female |
|---|---|---|---|
| Population | 2735 | 1360 | 1375 |
| Children aged below 6 years | 418 | 214 | 204 |
| Scheduled caste | 69 | 38 | 31 |
| Scheduled tribe | 2626 | 1297 | 1329 |
| Literates | 1373 | 810 | 563 |
| Workers (all) | 1276 | 756 | 520 |
| Main workers (total) | 920 | 620 | 300 |
| Main workers: Cultivators | 21 | 18 | 3 |
| Main workers: Agricultural labourers | 171 | 54 | 117 |
| Main workers: Household industry workers | 4 | 2 | 2 |
| Main workers: Other | 724 | 546 | 178 |
| Marginal workers (total) | 356 | 136 | 220 |
| Marginal workers: Cultivators | 18 | 9 | 9 |
| Marginal workers: Agricultural labourers | 281 | 79 | 202 |
| Marginal workers: Household industry workers | 3 | 2 | 1 |
| Marginal workers: Others | 54 | 46 | 8 |
| Non-workers | 1459 | 604 | 855 |
