= Sutrakar =

Village in Maharashtra

- village
- Location in Maharashtra, India Sutrakar (India)
- Coordinates: 20.1444462°N 72.9401509°E
- Country: India
- State: Maharashtra
- District: Palghar
- Taluka: Talasari
- Elevation: 47 m (154 ft)

Population (2011)
  - Total: 8,795
- Time zone: UTC+5:30 (IST)
- 2011 census code: 551550

Sutrakar is a village in the Palghar district of Maharashtra, India. It is located in the Talasari taluka.

== Demographics ==
According to the 2011 census of India, Sutrakar has 1541 households. The effective literacy rate (i.e. the literacy rate of population excluding children aged 6 and below) is 54.53%.

Demographics (2011 Census)
	Total	Male	Female
Population	8795	4333	4462
Children aged below 6 years	1619	797	822
Scheduled caste	87	41	46
Scheduled tribe	8633	4254	4379
Literates	3913	2376	1537
Workers (all)	3329	1994	1335
Main workers (total)	1838	1290	548
Main workers: Cultivators	817	571	246
Main workers: Agricultural labourers	517	326	191
Main workers: Household industry workers	28	8	20
Main workers: Other	476	385	91
Marginal workers (total)	1491	704	787
Marginal workers: Cultivators	405	204	201
Marginal workers: Agricultural labourers	772	330	442
Marginal workers: Household industry workers	95	16	79
Marginal workers: Others	219	154	65
Non-workers	5466	2339	3127
