= Borigaon =

Village in Maharashtra

- village
- Location in Maharashtra, India Borigaon (India)
- Coordinates: 20.1253714°N 72.7776873°E
- Country: India
- State: Maharashtra
- District: Palghar
- Taluka: Talasari
- Elevation: 26 m (85 ft)

Population (2011)
  - Total: 940
- Time zone: UTC+5:30 (IST)
- 2011 census code: 551557

Borigaon is a village in the Palghar district of Maharashtra, India. It is located in the Talasari taluka.

== Demographics ==
According to the 2011 census of India, Borigaon has 213 households. The effective literacy rate (i.e. the literacy rate of population excluding children aged 6 and below) is 57.16%.

Demographics (2011 Census)
| | Total | Male | Female |
|---|---|---|---|
| Population | 940 | 423 | 517 |
| Children aged below 6 years | 158 | 86 | 72 |
| Scheduled caste | 0 | 0 | 0 |
| Scheduled tribe | 905 | 403 | 502 |
| Literates | 447 | 248 | 199 |
| Workers (all) | 438 | 187 | 251 |
| Main workers (total) | 434 | 186 | 248 |
| Main workers: Cultivators | 34 | 25 | 9 |
| Main workers: Agricultural labourers | 326 | 118 | 208 |
| Main workers: Household industry workers | 5 | 4 | 1 |
| Main workers: Other | 69 | 39 | 30 |
| Marginal workers (total) | 4 | 1 | 3 |
| Marginal workers: Cultivators | 2 | 0 | 2 |
| Marginal workers: Agricultural labourers | 1 | 0 | 1 |
| Marginal workers: Household industry workers | 0 | 0 | 0 |
| Marginal workers: Others | 1 | 1 | 0 |
| Non-workers | 502 | 236 | 266 |
