= Anwir =

Village in Maharashtra

- village
- Location in Maharashtra, India Anwir (India)
- Coordinates: 20.1698406°N 72.9637728°E
- Country: India
- State: Maharashtra
- District: Palghar
- Taluka: Talasari
- Elevation: 60 m (200 ft)

Population (2011)
  - Total: 3,604
- Time zone: UTC+5:30 (IST)
- 2011 census code: 551549

Anwir is a village in the Palghar district of Maharashtra, India. It is located in the Talasari taluka.

== Demographics ==
According to the 2011 census of India, Anwir has 585 households. The effective literacy rate (i.e. the literacy rate of population excluding children aged 6 and below) is 46.47%.

Demographics (2011 Census)
	Total	Male	Female
Population	3604	1801	1803
Children aged below 6 years	843	417	426
Scheduled caste	0	0	0
Scheduled tribe	3583	1794	1789
Literates	1283	820	463
Workers (all)	1663	873	790
Main workers (total)	905	555	350
Main workers: Cultivators	161	112	49
Main workers: Agricultural labourers	346	142	204
Main workers: Household industry workers	8	7	1
Main workers: Other	390	294	96
Marginal workers (total)	758	318	440
Marginal workers: Cultivators	381	135	246
Marginal workers: Agricultural labourers	212	63	149
Marginal workers: Household industry workers	4	3	1
Marginal workers: Others	161	117	44
Non-workers	1941	928	1013
