= Vilatgaon =

Village in Maharashtra

- village
- Location in Maharashtra, India Vilatgaon (India)
- Coordinates: 20.1566782°N 72.8604097°E
- Country: India
- State: Maharashtra
- District: Palghar
- Taluka: Talasari
- Elevation: 57 m (187 ft)

Population (2011)
  - Total: 850
- Time zone: UTC+5:30 (IST)
- 2011 census code: 551546

Vilatgaon is a village in the Palghar district of Maharashtra, India. It is located in the Talasari taluka.

== Demographics ==
According to the 2011 census of India, Vilatgaon has 146 households. The effective literacy rate (i.e. the literacy rate of population excluding children aged 6 and below) is 49.93%.

Demographics (2011 Census)
	Total	Male	Female
Population	850	450	400
Children aged below 6 years	161	97	64
Scheduled caste	0	0	0
Scheduled tribe	850	450	400
Literates	344	230	114
Workers (all)	335	226	109
Main workers (total)	321	217	104
Main workers: Cultivators	228	135	93
Main workers: Agricultural labourers	20	17	3
Main workers: Household industry workers	1	1	0
Main workers: Other	72	64	8
Marginal workers (total)	14	9	5
Marginal workers: Cultivators	3	2	1
Marginal workers: Agricultural labourers	1	0	1
Marginal workers: Household industry workers	1	0	1
Marginal workers: Others	9	7	2
Non-workers	515	224	291
