= Vevaji =

Village in Maharashtra

- village
- Location in Maharashtra, India Vevaji (India)
- Coordinates: 20.144423°N 72.7954159°E
- Country: India
- State: Maharashtra
- District: Palghar
- Taluka: Talasari
- Elevation: 24 m (79 ft)

Population (2011)
  - Total: 2,672
- Time zone: UTC+5:30 (IST)
- 2011 census code: 551555

Vevaji is a village in the Palghar district of Maharashtra, India. It is located in the Talasari taluka.

== Demographics ==
According to the 2011 census of India, Vevaji has 563 households. The effective literacy rate (i.e. the literacy rate of population excluding children aged 6 and below) is 66.58%.

Demographics (2011 Census)
	Total	Male	Female
Population	2672	1318	1354
Children aged below 6 years	341	175	166
Scheduled caste	44	21	23
Scheduled tribe	2524	1240	1284
Literates	1552	884	668
Workers (all)	1267	747	520
Main workers (total)	804	521	283
Main workers: Cultivators	170	88	82
Main workers: Agricultural labourers	304	183	121
Main workers: Household industry workers	51	42	9
Main workers: Other	279	208	71
Marginal workers (total)	463	226	237
Marginal workers: Cultivators	10	6	4
Marginal workers: Agricultural labourers	409	186	223
Marginal workers: Household industry workers	10	6	4
Marginal workers: Others	34	28	6
Non-workers	1405	571	834
