= Sutarpada =

Village in Maharashtra

- village
- Location in Maharashtra, India Sutarpada (India)
- Coordinates: 20.1531556°N 72.8973302°E
- Country: India
- State: Maharashtra
- District: Palghar
- Taluka: Talasari
- Elevation: 91 m (299 ft)

Population (2011)
  - Total: 4,388
- Time zone: UTC+5:30 (IST)
- 2011 census code: 551552

Sutarpada is a village in the Palghar district of Maharashtra, India. It is located in the Talasari taluka.

== Demographics ==
According to the 2011 census of India, Sutarpada has 853 households. The effective literacy rate (i.e. the literacy rate of population excluding children aged 6 and below) is 74.23%.

Demographics (2011 Census)
| | Total | Male | Female |
|---|---|---|---|
| Population | 4388 | 2395 | 1993 |
| Children aged below 6 years | 729 | 361 | 368 |
| Scheduled caste | 47 | 24 | 23 |
| Scheduled tribe | 1278 | 677 | 601 |
| Literates | 2716 | 1654 | 1062 |
| Workers (all) | 1250 | 1119 | 131 |
| Main workers (total) | 1053 | 964 | 89 |
| Main workers: Cultivators | 36 | 25 | 11 |
| Main workers: Agricultural labourers | 30 | 25 | 5 |
| Main workers: Household industry workers | 31 | 27 | 4 |
| Main workers: Other | 956 | 887 | 69 |
| Marginal workers (total) | 197 | 155 | 42 |
| Marginal workers: Cultivators | 14 | 10 | 4 |
| Marginal workers: Agricultural labourers | 109 | 86 | 23 |
| Marginal workers: Household industry workers | 0 | 0 | 0 |
| Marginal workers: Others | 74 | 59 | 15 |
| Non-workers | 3138 | 1276 | 1862 |
