= Dongari =

Village in Maharashtra

- village
- Location in Maharashtra, India Dongari (India)
- Coordinates: 20.1739606°N 72.8604097°E
- Country: India
- State: Maharashtra
- District: Palghar
- Taluka: Talasari
- Elevation: 69 m (226 ft)

Population (2011)
  - Total: 5,581
- Time zone: UTC+5:30 (IST)
- 2011 census code: 551541

Dongari is a village in the Palghar district of Maharashtra, India. It is located in the Talasari taluka.

== Demographics ==
According to the 2011 census of India, Dongari has 990 households. The effective literacy rate (i.e. the literacy rate of population excluding children aged 6 and below) is 46.32%.

Demographics (2011 Census)
	Total	Male	Female
Population	5581	2742	2839
Children aged below 6 years	1069	534	535
Scheduled caste	0	0	0
Scheduled tribe	5445	2631	2814
Literates	2090	1293	797
Workers (all)	2566	1435	1131
Main workers (total)	1928	1197	731
Main workers: Cultivators	643	344	299
Main workers: Agricultural labourers	526	287	239
Main workers: Household industry workers	26	19	7
Main workers: Other	733	547	186
Marginal workers (total)	638	238	400
Marginal workers: Cultivators	98	20	78
Marginal workers: Agricultural labourers	412	144	268
Marginal workers: Household industry workers	8	3	5
Marginal workers: Others	120	71	49
Non-workers	3015	1307	1708
