= Ibhadpada =

Village in Maharashtra

- village
- Location in Maharashtra, India Ibhadpada (India)
- Coordinates: 20.1397516°N 72.8929°E
- Country: India
- State: Maharashtra
- District: Palghar
- Taluka: Talasari
- Elevation: 79 m (259 ft)

Population (2011)
  - Total: 1,248
- Time zone: UTC+5:30 (IST)
- 2011 census code: 551551

Ibhadpada is a village in the Palghar district of Maharashtra, India. It is located in the Talasari taluka.

== Demographics ==
According to the 2011 census of India, Ibhadpada has 225 households. The effective literacy rate (i.e. the literacy rate of population excluding children aged 6 and below) is 49.4%.

Demographics (2011 Census)
	Total	Male	Female
Population	1248	614	634
Children aged below 6 years	254	141	113
Scheduled caste	0	0	0
Scheduled tribe	1175	567	608
Literates	491	293	198
Workers (all)	633	316	317
Main workers (total)	478	278	200
Main workers: Cultivators	300	152	148
Main workers: Agricultural labourers	24	13	11
Main workers: Household industry workers	0	0	0
Main workers: Other	154	113	41
Marginal workers (total)	155	38	117
Marginal workers: Cultivators	20	8	12
Marginal workers: Agricultural labourers	122	22	100
Marginal workers: Household industry workers	0	0	0
Marginal workers: Others	13	8	5
Non-workers	615	298	317
