= Brahmanpada =

Brahmanpada may refer to any of the following villages in India:

- Brahmanpada, Nuapada, Odisha
- Brahmanpada, Palghar, Maharashtra

Brahmanpada, Nuapada is located in Nuapada district of Western Odisha India. People of this village are use the Sambalpuri(Kosli) Language in their daily life.
