= Kharadpada =

Village in Maharashtra

- village
- Location in Maharashtra, India Kharadpada (India)
- Coordinates: 20.145271°N 72.8471169°E
- Country: India
- State: Maharashtra
- District: Palghar
- Taluka: Talasari
- Elevation: 32 m (105 ft)

Population (2011)
  - Total: 730
- Time zone: UTC+5:30 (IST)
- 2011 census code: 551545

Kharadpada is a village in the Palghar district of Maharashtra, India. It is located in the Talasari taluka.

== Demographics ==
According to the 2011 census of India, Kharadpada has 133 households. The effective literacy rate (i.e. the literacy rate of population excluding children aged 6 and below) is 53.04%.

Demographics (2011 Census)
	Total	Male	Female
Population	730	354	376
Children aged below 6 years	138	76	62
Scheduled caste	0	0	0
Scheduled tribe	730	354	376
Literates	314	192	122
Workers (all)	229	186	43
Main workers (total)	226	184	42
Main workers: Cultivators	13	13	0
Main workers: Agricultural labourers	99	90	9
Main workers: Household industry workers	0	0	0
Main workers: Other	114	81	33
Marginal workers (total)	3	2	1
Marginal workers: Cultivators	2	2	0
Marginal workers: Agricultural labourers	1	0	1
Marginal workers: Household industry workers	0	0	0
Marginal workers: Others	0	0	0
Non-workers	501	168	333
