= Bormal =

Village in Maharashtra

- village
- Location in Maharashtra, India Bormal (India)
- Coordinates: 20.2052481°N 72.9431038°E
- Country: India
- State: Maharashtra
- District: Palghar
- Taluka: Talasari
- Elevation: 34 m (112 ft)

Population (2011)
  - Total: 1,661
- Time zone: UTC+5:30 (IST)
- 2011 census code: 551535

Bormal is a village in the Palghar district of Maharashtra, India. It is located in the Talasari taluka.

== Demographics ==
According to the 2011 census of India, Bormal has 310 households, and a population of 2586. The effective literacy rate (i.e. the literacy rate of population excluding children aged 6 and below) is 55.73%.

Demographics (2011 Census)
	Total	Male	Female
Population	1661	800	861
Children aged below 6 years	308	161	147
Scheduled caste	0	0	0
Scheduled tribe	1568	757	811
Literates	754	427	327
Workers (all)	741	419	322
Main workers (total)	348	301	47
Main workers: Cultivators	211	205	6
Main workers: Agricultural labourers	87	58	29
Main workers: Household industry workers	1	0	1
Main workers: Other	49	38	11
Marginal workers (total)	393	118	275
Marginal workers: Cultivators	36	16	20
Marginal workers: Agricultural labourers	351	102	249
Marginal workers: Household industry workers	1	0	1
Marginal workers: Others	5	0	5
Non-workers	920	381	539
