= Warli people =

Ethnic group from western India

Warli
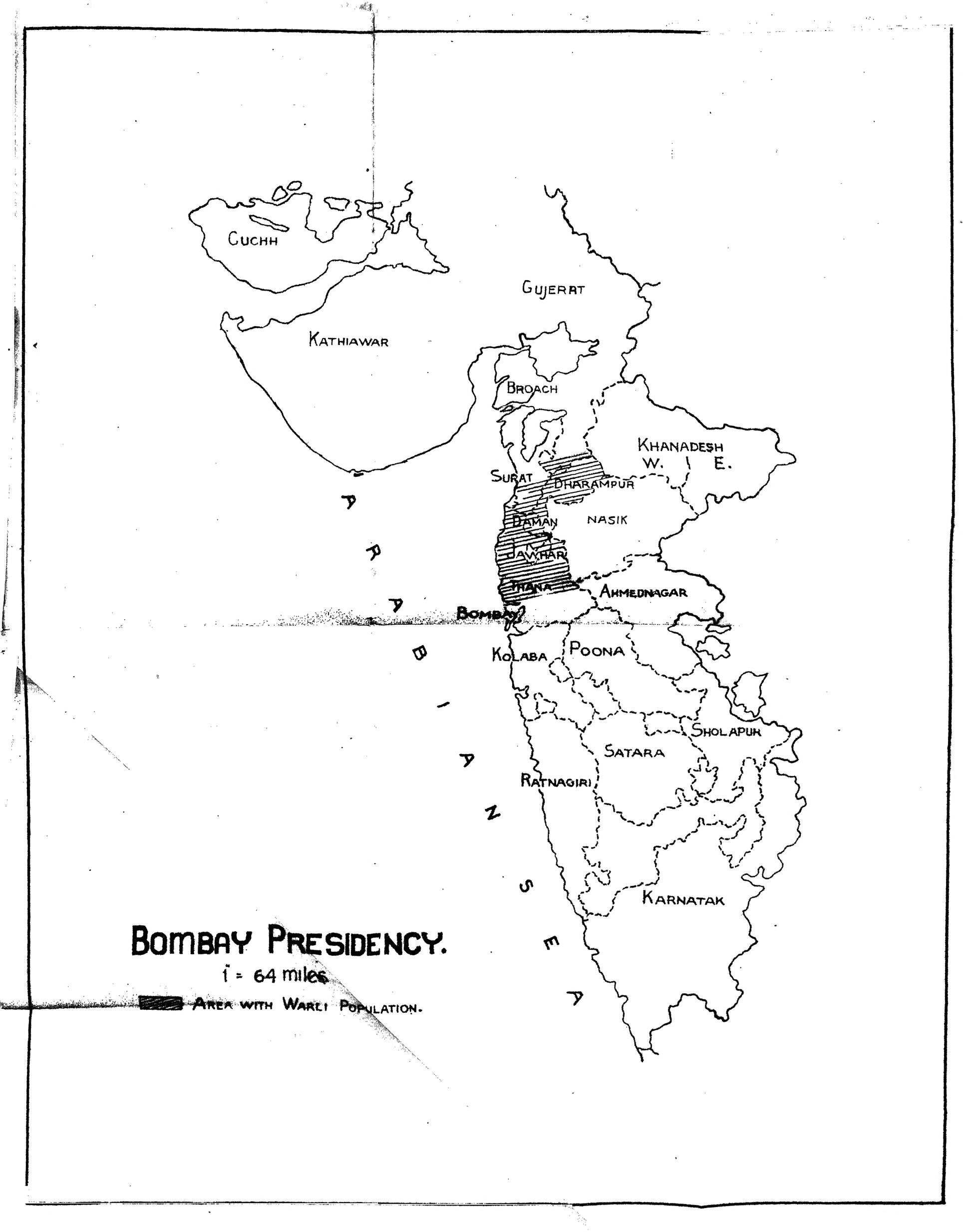
- Distribution of Warli population in the then Bombay Presidency, 1945

Regions with significant populations
- Maharashtra • Gujarat

Languages
- Varli

Religion
- Animism • Hinduism

Related ethnic groups
- Indo-Aryan peoples; Marathi people; Gujarati; Bhil people; Konkani people

The Warli or Varli are an indigenous tribe (Adivasi) of western India, living in mountainous as well as coastal areas along the Maharashtra-Gujarat border and surrounding areas. They have their own animistic beliefs, life, customs and traditions, and as a result of acculturation they have adopted many Hindu beliefs. The Warli speak the unwritten Varli language which belongs to the southern zone of the Indo-Aryan languages.

== History ==
The Warli people are part of India’s indigenous Adivasi population. Originally inhabiting the forests and hilly terrains of the region, they were the primary owners of all land in the Umbergaon, Dhanu, and Palghar talukas of the Thane district in Maharashtra until the 1870s.

=== Colonial dispossession and exploitation ===
The 1870s marked a turning point as the British colonial administration brought the Warli territories under direct control. Following this administrative shift, outsiders, including Mahajans and various petty officers, utilized the Warlis' illiteracy to systematically seize their lands. Consequently, the Warli became labourers on land they once owned, subjected to extreme exploitation by newly established landlords.

During this era, the Warli suffered under two primary feudal systems:

- Begar System: A form of forced labour where Warlis cultivated the landlords' primary holdings without any financial remuneration, with the entire harvest kept by the owners.
- Sharecropping: Landlords provided Warlis with small plots of inferior land. Despite performing all the physical labour, the Warli were forced to surrender at least half of the produce to the landlords.

Colonial and administrative records from this period document widespread physical abuse, including public whippings and torture. Warli women also faced systemic sexual oppression; children born from this exploitation were categorized under a specific caste known as "Wattas".

=== The Warli Revolt (1945–1947) ===
By 1939, an official inquiry by British magistrate David Symington confirmed that Warli living conditions had reached an "abysmal depth". This led to a period of organized resistance led by Shamrao and Godavari Parulekar, who joined the community in the early 1940s.

The primary phase of the revolt occurred between 1945 and 1947:

- January 1945: The movement gained momentum at the Maharashtra Provincial Kisan Conference in Titwala, attended by the first group of 250 Warli participants.
- May 1945: Approximately 5,000 Warlis gathered at Zari to formally pledge an end to the begar system, demanding adequate wages for their labour.
- October 1945: Tensions escalated when landlords and police resisted demands for minimum wages in the grass-cutting industry. During a rally of 7,000 people at Talwada, police fire resulted in the deaths of five activists, including leader Jethya Gangad.

Despite these casualties and the subsequent arrest and externment of their leaders, the Warli continued organized peaceful resistance. Their persistence eventually forced the government and landlords to concede, leading to the abolition of the begar system and the establishment of minimum wages.

=== Post-Independence struggles ===
Following the restoration of the Congress Ministry in 1946, the community faced a new wave of state-led repression under Morarji Desai, who declared an emergency in Thane and arrested hundreds of militants. However, continued unity and determination eventually forced the government to retreat, leading to the abolition of most feudal exploitations by the early 1950s.

== Demographics ==
Warlis are found in Jawhar, Vikramgad, Mokhada, Dahanu and Talasari talukas of the northern Palghar district, parts of Nashik and Dhule as well as Navapur taluka of Nandurbar of Maharashtra, Valsad, Dangs, Navsari and Surat districts of Gujarat, and the union territory of Dadra and Nagar Haveli and Daman and Diu.

Waralis have sub castes such as Murde varli and Davar varali.

== Warli painting ==
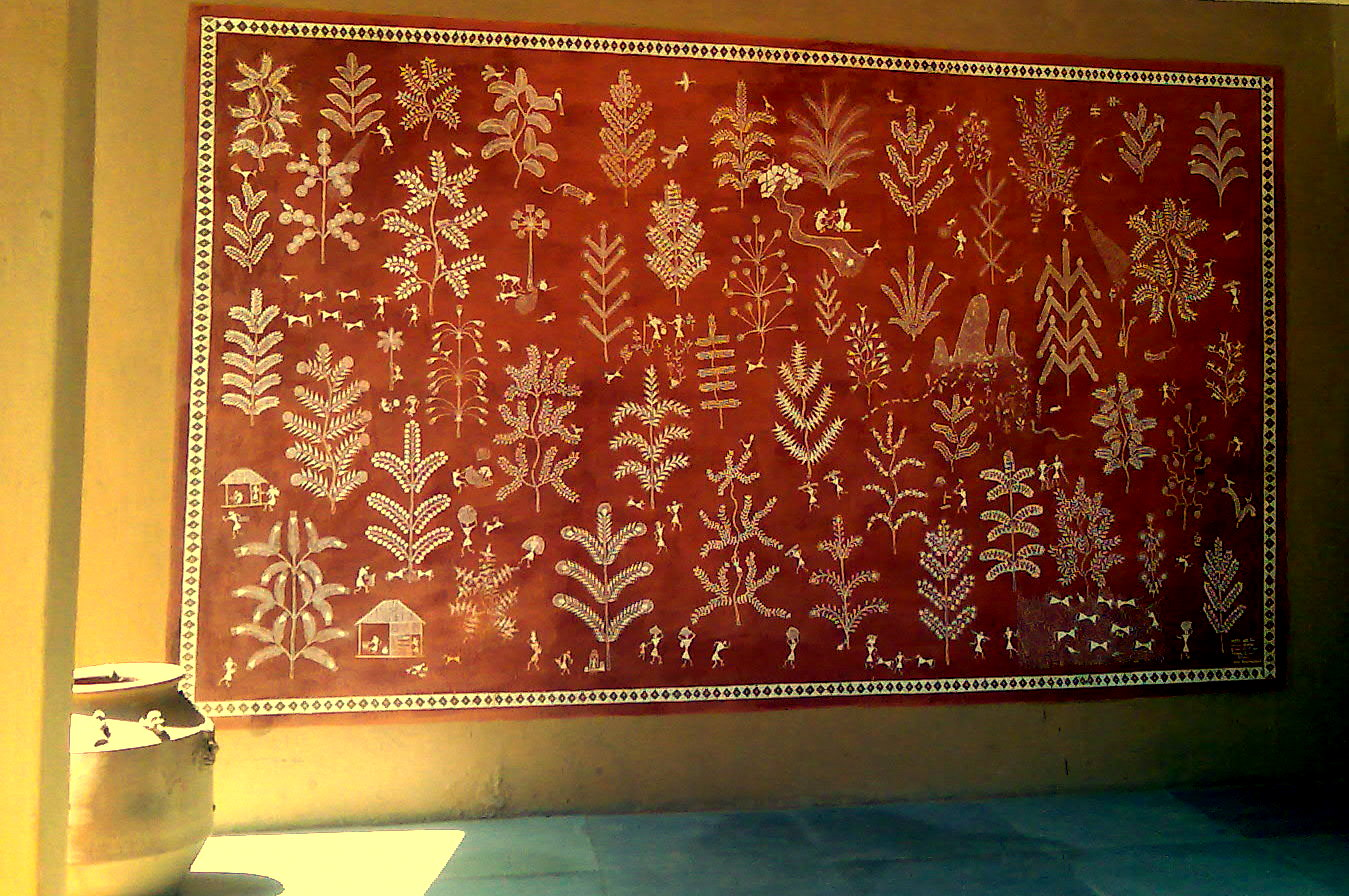
Warli paintings, at Sanskriti Kendra Museum, Anandagram, New Delhi

In the book The Painted World of the Warlis Yashodhara Dalmia claimed that the Warli carry on a tradition stretching back to 2500 or 3000 BCE. Their mural paintings are similar to those done between 500 and 10,000 BCE in the Rock Shelters of Bhimbetka, in Madhya Pradesh.

Their extremely rudimentary wall paintings use a very basic graphic vocabulary: a circle, a triangle and a square. Their paintings were monosyllabic. The circle and triangle come from their observation of nature, the circle representing the sun and the moon, the triangle derived from mountains and pointed trees. Only the square seems to obey a different logic and seems to be a human invention, indicating a sacred enclosure or a piece of land. So the central motive in each ritual painting is the square, known as the "chauk" or "chaukat", mostly of two types: Devchauk and Lagnachauk. Inside a Devchauk, we find Palaghata, the mother goddess, symbolizing fertility. Significantly, male gods are unusual among the Warli and are frequently related to spirits which have taken human shape. The central motive in these ritual paintings is surrounded by scenes portraying hunting, fishing and farming, festivals and dances, trees and animals. Human and animal bodies are represented by two triangles joined at the tip; the upper triangle depicts the trunk and the lower triangle the pelvis. Their precarious equilibrium symbolizes the balance of the universe, and of the couple, and has the practical and amusing advantage of animating the bodies.

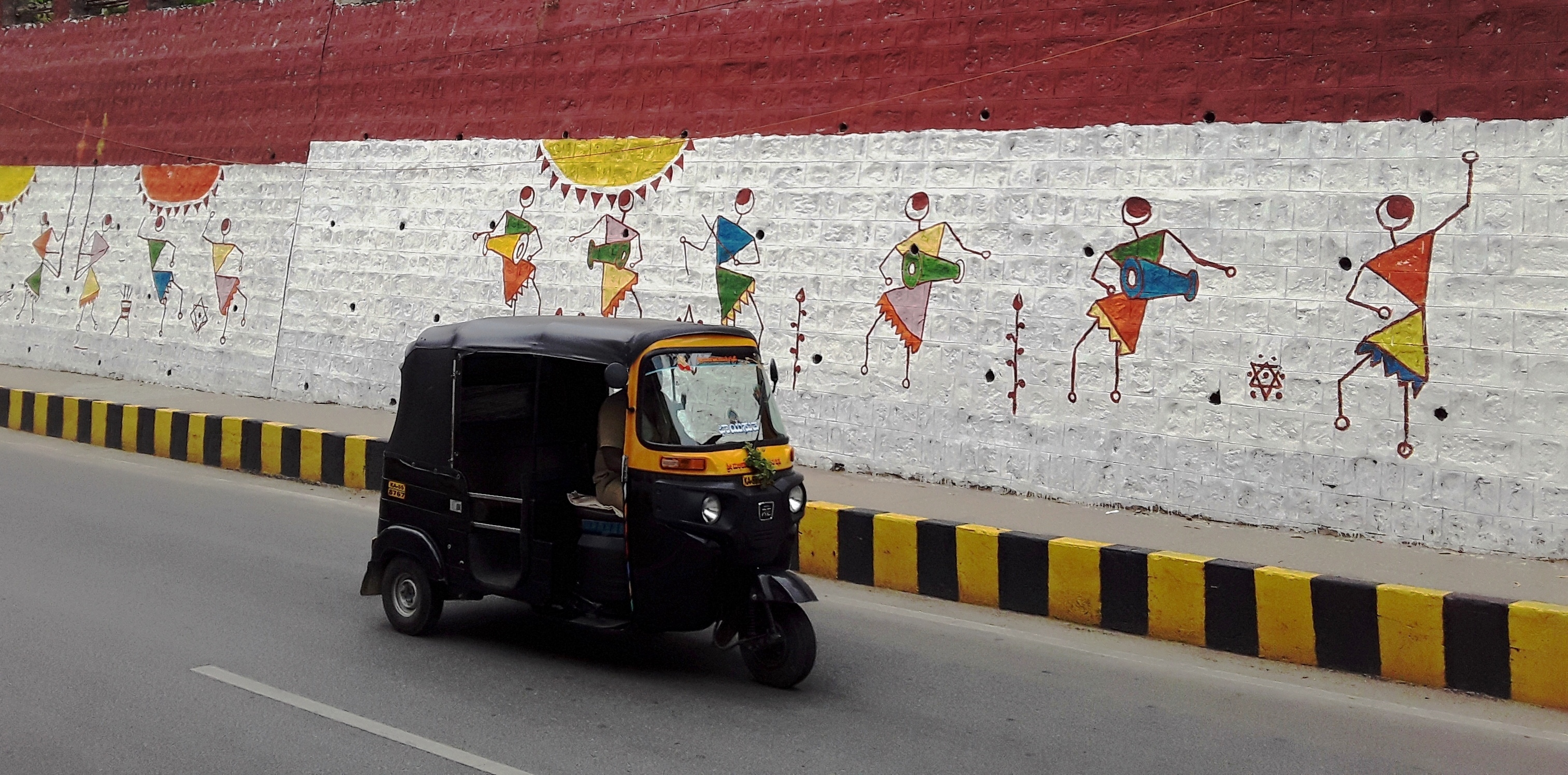
Warli paintings in Mysore, India

The pared down pictorial language is matched by a rudimentary technique. The ritual paintings are usually done inside the huts. The walls are made of a mixture of branches, earth and cow dung, making a red ochre background for the wall paintings. The Warli use only white for their paintings. Their white pigment is a mixture of rice paste and water with gum as a binding. They use a bamboo stick chewed at the end to make it as supple as a paintbrush. The wall paintings are done only for special occasions such as weddings or harvests. The lack of regular artistic activity explains the very crude style of their paintings, which were the preserve of the womenfolk until the late 1970s.

However, in the 1970s, Warli ritual art took a radical turn when Jivya Soma Mashe and his son Balu Mashe started to paint, not for any special ritual, but because of his artistic pursuits. Warli painting also featured in Coca-Cola's 'Come home on Diwali' ad campaign in 2010, which was a tribute to the spirit of India's youth and a recognition of the distinct lifestyle of the Warli tribe of Western India.

== Culture ==
The Warli were traditionally semi-nomadic. They lived together in small-scale groups with a headman leading them. However, recent demographic changes have transformed the Warli today into mainly agriculturists. They cultivate many crops like rice and wheat. Warli women wear toe rings and necklaces as a sign of being married. Some Warli practice polygyny.

== Bibliography ==
- Satyawadi, Sudha (2010). Unique Art of Warli Paintings. D. K. Printworld Pvt. Ltd. ISBN 8124605572.
