= O. P. Jain =

Indian art collector (born 1929)

Rajendra Mullick
- Born: 1929 (age 96–97); Old Delhi, India
- Occupations: Art collector, patron and philanthropist
- Awards: Padma Shri in 2013

Om Prakash Jain (born 1929) is an Indian art collector, patron and philanthropist. He is the Founder-President of the Sanskriti Pratishthan (Sankriti Foundation), established in 1979, which runs the Sanskriti Kendra Museums at Anandagram, Delhi.

He has remained the convenor of the Indian National Trust for Art and Cultural Heritage (INTACH) for 15 years. He has been a promoter of Neemrana Fort Palace Hotels.

== Biography ==
Jain was born and brought up in a business family in Old Delhi, where his family has an office at Chawri Bazar. Without much formal education, he joined the family paper-trading business at an early age. It was a chance meeting with writer Mulk Raj Anand, in the 1970s, that inspired him to work for art and cultural heritage conservation.

He spent many years collecting everyday functional objects, like kitchen and household items, made by artisans. In 1984, he set up a small museum with his private collection at the basement of his Kinari Bazaar house in Chandni Chowk area. 10 years later, the collection shifted to the Sanskriti Museum of Everyday Art, at Anandagram – an artist village, he established on the outskirts of Delhi.

Subsequently, the Museum of Terracotta Art and Textile were also established.

== Honours ==
He was awarded the Padma Shri by Government of India, in 2003, for his contribution to the Arts.
