= Brahmanpada, Palghar =

Village in Maharashtra

Brahmanpada
- village
- Location in Maharashtra, India Brahmanpada (India)
- Coordinates: 20.1049212°N 72.7747325°E
- Country: India
- State: Maharashtra
- District: Palghar
- Taluka: Talasari
- Elevation: 23 m (75 ft)

Population (2011)
  - Total: 2,571
- Time zone: UTC+5:30 (IST)
- 2011 census code: 551559

Brahmanpada is a village in the Palghar district of Maharashtra, India. It is located in the Talasari taluka.

== Demographics ==
According to the 2011 census of India, Brahmanpada has 461 households. The effective literacy rate (i.e. the literacy rate of population excluding children aged 6 and below) is 39.53%.

Demographics (2011 Census)
	Total	Male	Female
Population	2571	1241	1330
Children aged below 6 years	469	219	250
Scheduled caste	0	0	0
Scheduled tribe	2512	1212	1300
Literates	831	473	358
Workers (all)	1427	701	726
Main workers (total)	1409	697	712
Main workers: Cultivators	401	200	201
Main workers: Agricultural labourers	828	365	463
Main workers: Household industry workers	0	0	0
Main workers: Other	180	132	48
Marginal workers (total)	18	4	14
Marginal workers: Cultivators	1	0	1
Marginal workers: Agricultural labourers	16	3	13
Marginal workers: Household industry workers	0	0	0
Marginal workers: Others	1	1	0
Non-workers	1144	540	604
