= Thakarpada (census code 551567) =

Village in Maharashtra

- village
- Location in Maharashtra, India Thakarpada (India)
- Coordinates: 20.12267519°N 72.92542219°E
- Country: India
- State: Maharashtra
- District: Palghar
- Taluka: Talasari
- Elevation: 79 m (259 ft)

Population (2011)
  - Total: 5,054
- Time zone: UTC+5:30 (IST)
- 2011 census code: 551567

Thakarpada is a village in the Palghar district of Maharashtra, India. It is located in the Talasari taluka. It lies on the national highway 48 .

== Demographics ==
According to the 2011 census of India, Thakarpada has 831 households. The effective literacy rate (i.e. the literacy rate of population excluding children aged 6 and below) is 75.81%.

Demographics (2011 Census)
	Total	Male	Female
Population	5054	2641	2413
Children aged below 6 years	681	347	334
Scheduled caste	162	85	77
Scheduled tribe	3926	2008	1918
Literates	3315	1928	1387
Workers (all)	1566	971	595
Main workers (total)	1108	745	363
Main workers: Cultivators	389	219	170
Main workers: Agricultural labourers	77	42	35
Main workers: Household industry workers	15	6	9
Main workers: Other	627	478	149
Marginal workers (total)	458	226	232
Marginal workers: Cultivators	217	100	117
Marginal workers: Agricultural labourers	95	18	77
Marginal workers: Household industry workers	5	1	4
Marginal workers: Others	141	107	34
Non-workers	3488	1670	1818
