= Thakarpada (census code 551539) =

Village in Maharashtra

- village
- Location in Maharashtra, India Thakarpada (India)
- Coordinates: 20.1931264°N 72.8648404°E
- Country: India
- State: Maharashtra
- District: Palghar
- Taluka: Talasari
- Elevation: 32 m (105 ft)

Population (2011)
  - Total: 1,278
- Time zone: UTC+5:30 (IST)
- 2011 census code: 551539

Thakarpada is a village in the Palghar district of Maharashtra, India. It is located in the Talasari taluka. It lies close to the National Highway 8; the nearest railway station is in Sanjan, Gujarat.

== Demographics ==
According to the 2011 census of India, Thakarpada has 218 households. The effective literacy rate (i.e. the literacy rate of population excluding children aged 6 and below) is 55.85%.

Demographics (2011 Census)
	Total	Male	Female
Population	1278	620	658
Children aged below 6 years	227	108	119
Scheduled caste	1	1	0
Scheduled tribe	1275	618	657
Literates	587	364	223
Workers (all)	541	335	206
Main workers (total)	177	152	25
Main workers: Cultivators	24	21	3
Main workers: Agricultural labourers	66	63	3
Main workers: Household industry workers	5	3	2
Main workers: Other	82	65	17
Marginal workers (total)	364	183	181
Marginal workers: Cultivators	254	127	127
Marginal workers: Agricultural labourers	11	4	7
Marginal workers: Household industry workers	8	3	5
Marginal workers: Others	91	49	42
Non-workers	737	285	452
