= Patilpada, Palghar (census code 551553) =

Village in Maharashtra

Patilpada
- village
- Location in Maharashtra, India Patilpada (India)
- Coordinates: 20.15208829°N 72.87209988°E
- Country: India
- State: Maharashtra
- District: Palghar
- Taluka: Talasari
- Elevation: 74 m (243 ft)

Population (2011)
  - Total: 3,000
- Time zone: UTC+5:30 (IST)
- 2011 census code: 551553

Patilpada is a village in the Palghar district of Maharashtra, India. It is located in the Talasari taluka.

== Demographics ==
According to the 2011 census of India, Patilpada has 602 households. The effective literacy rate (i.e. the literacy rate of population excluding children aged 6 and below) is 49.86%.

Demographics (2011 Census)
	Total	Male	Female
Population	3000	1423	1577
Children aged below 6 years	559	275	284
Scheduled caste	0	0	0
Scheduled tribe	2974	1412	1562
Literates	1217	744	473
Workers (all)	1170	716	454
Main workers (total)	614	412	202
Main workers: Cultivators	210	145	65
Main workers: Agricultural labourers	125	83	42
Main workers: Household industry workers	1	1	0
Main workers: Other	278	183	95
Marginal workers (total)	556	304	252
Marginal workers: Cultivators	195	83	112
Marginal workers: Agricultural labourers	149	76	73
Marginal workers: Household industry workers	0	0	0
Marginal workers: Others	212	145	67
Non-workers	1830	707	1123
