= Patilpada, Palghar (census code 551561) =

Village in Maharashtra

Patilpada
- village
- Location in Maharashtra, India Patilpada (India)
- Coordinates: 20.09511049°N 72.82454967°E
- Country: India
- State: Maharashtra
- District: Palghar
- Taluka: Talasari
- Elevation: 126 m (413 ft)

Population (2011)
  - Total: 1,240
- Time zone: UTC+5:30 (IST)
- 2011 census code: 551561

Patilpada is a village in the Palghar district of Maharashtra, India. It is located in the Talasari taluka.

== Demographics ==
According to the 2011 census of India, Patilpada has 242 households. The effective literacy rate (i.e. the literacy rate of population excluding children aged 6 and below) is 59.2%.

Demographics (2011 Census)
	Total	Male	Female
Population	1240	562	678
Children aged below 6 years	213	89	124
Scheduled caste	11	5	6
Scheduled tribe	1187	535	652
Literates	608	347	261
Workers (all)	544	296	248
Main workers (total)	408	274	134
Main workers: Cultivators	232	144	88
Main workers: Agricultural labourers	11	6	5
Main workers: Household industry workers	10	8	2
Main workers: Other	155	116	39
Marginal workers (total)	136	22	114
Marginal workers: Cultivators	53	8	45
Marginal workers: Agricultural labourers	66	10	56
Marginal workers: Household industry workers	3	0	3
Marginal workers: Others	14	4	10
Non-workers	696	266	430
