= Patilpada, Palghar (census code 551571) =

Village in Maharashtra

Patilpada
- village
- Location in Maharashtra, India Patilpada (India)
- Coordinates: 20.1134875°N 72.90274143°E
- Country: India
- State: Maharashtra
- District: Palghar
- Taluka: Talasari
- Elevation: 60 m (200 ft)

Population (2011)
  - Total: 3,658
- Time zone: UTC+5:30 (IST)
- 2011 census code: 551571

Patilpada is a village in the Palghar district of Maharashtra, India. It is located in the Talasari taluka.

== Demographics ==
According to the 2011 census of India, Patilpada has 770 households. The effective literacy rate (i.e. the literacy rate of population excluding children aged 6 and below) is 68.87%.

Demographics (2011 Census)
	Total	Male	Female
Population	3658	1836	1822
Children aged below 6 years	555	291	264
Scheduled caste	144	73	71
Scheduled tribe	2610	1291	1319
Literates	2137	1211	926
Workers (all)	1440	906	534
Main workers (total)	910	616	294
Main workers: Cultivators	212	113	99
Main workers: Agricultural labourers	115	64	51
Main workers: Household industry workers	72	61	11
Main workers: Other	511	378	133
Marginal workers (total)	530	290	240
Marginal workers: Cultivators	57	26	31
Marginal workers: Agricultural labourers	185	106	79
Marginal workers: Household industry workers	45	18	27
Marginal workers: Others	243	140	103
Non-workers	2218	930	1288
