= Padiglione d'Arte Contemporanea =

Coordinates: 45°28′22″N 9°11′58″E

Padiglione d'Arte Contemporanea di Milano
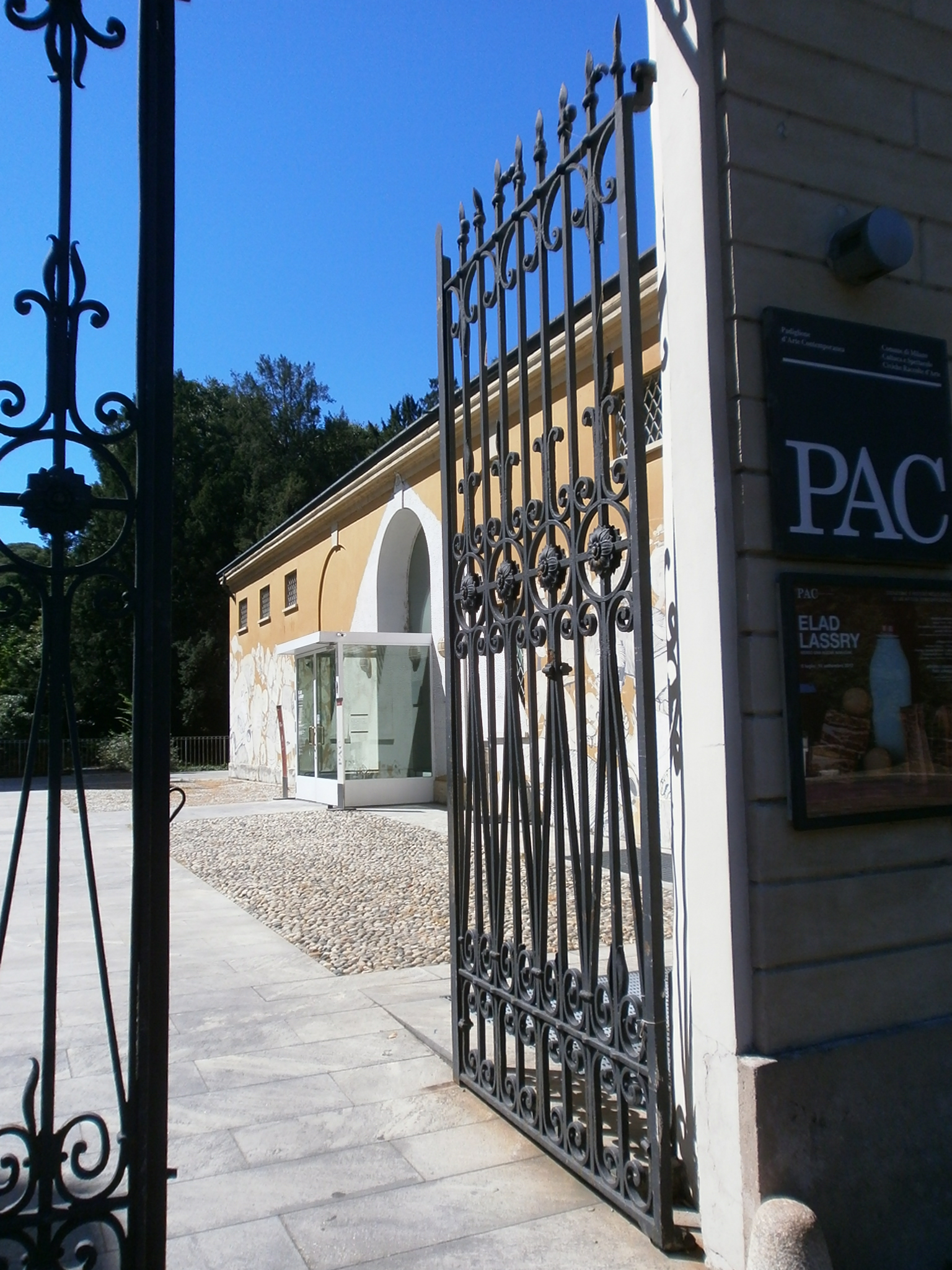
- The entrance in via Palestro
- Location: Via Palestro 14, Milan, Italy
- Type: art museum
- Director: Domenico Piraina
- Website: www.pacmilano.it

The Padiglione d'Arte Contemporanea or PAC is a museum of contemporary art in Milan, Italy. It is on via Palestro, next to the Galleria d'Arte Moderna, and across from the Giardini Pubblici Indro Montanelli.

== History ==
In 1947 the Municipality of Milan, pressed by the need to find a new exhibition space for contemporary art, focused its attention on the site of Villa Belgioiosa, destroyed by bombing in 1943. It was decided to use the Villa as a site for the Modern Art Gallery, and to build a brand new space exclusively devoted to contemporary art. The design by the architect Ignazio Gardella was preliminarily selected in March 1948, and the Pavilion was inaugurated in 1954. In 1979, PAC reopened after a long period of closure for renovations.

In 1993 a bomb destroyed the building (Via Palestro massacre) at a time when Italy was heavily committed in its fight against the Mafia. Gardella subsequently rebuilt the exhibiting space according to the original design, though with key technical improvements. In 1996 PAC resumed its normal activity with an exhibition dedicated to Leo Castelli.

Over the past thirty years PAC have organised solo presentations of international artists such as Marina Abramovic, Laurie Anderson, Jivya Soma Mashe, Christian Boltanski, Chen Zhen, Lucio Fontana, Franko B, Regina José Galindo, Alberto Garutti, Jannis Kounellis, Richard Long, Robert Motherwell, Pino Pascali, Cindy Sherman, Yinka Shonibare, Tony Oursler, Jeff Wall and Zhang Huan.

In 1994 Maurizio Cattelan presented at the Laure Genillard Gallery in London a sculpture called Lullaby consisting of a blue bag containing debris he collected from PAC after the bombing. The piece is part of the collection of Fondazione Sandretto Re Rebaudengo in Turin.
