= Patilpada, Dahanu (census code 551628) =

Village in Maharashtra, India

Patilpada
- village
- Location in Maharashtra, India Patilpada (India)
- Coordinates: 20.06681537°N 73.06127071°E
- Country: India
- State: Maharashtra
- District: Palghar
- Taluka: Dahanu
- Elevation: 221 m (725 ft)

Population (2011)
  - Total: 441
- Time zone: UTC+5:30 (IST)
- 2011 census code: 551628

Patilpada is a village in the Palghar district of Maharashtra, India. It is located in the Dahanu taluka.

== Demographics ==
According to the 2011 census of India, Patilpada has 119 households. The effective literacy rate (i.e. the literacy rate of population excluding children aged 6 and below) is 13.31%.

Demographics (2011 Census)
	Total	Male	Female
Population	441	178	263
Children aged below 6 years	133	60	73
Scheduled caste	0	0	0
Scheduled tribe	433	173	260
Literates	41	28	13
Workers (all)	228	92	136
Main workers (total)	217	88	129
Main workers: Cultivators	102	38	64
Main workers: Agricultural labourers	106	43	63
Main workers: Household industry workers	0	0	0
Main workers: Other	9	7	2
Marginal workers (total)	11	4	7
Marginal workers: Cultivators	6	3	3
Marginal workers: Agricultural labourers	4	1	3
Marginal workers: Household industry workers	0	0	0
Marginal workers: Others	1	0	1
Non-workers	213	86	127
