= Patilpada, Dahanu (census code 551603) =

Village in Maharashtra

Patilpada
- village
- Location in Maharashtra, India Patilpada (India)
- Coordinates: 19.98560986°N 72.77599096°E
- Country: India
- State: Maharashtra
- District: Palghar
- Taluka: Dahanu
- Elevation: 13 m (43 ft)

Population (2011)
  - Total: 2,895
- Time zone: UTC+5:30 (IST)
- 2011 census code: 551603

Patilpada is a village in the Palghar district of Maharashtra, India. It is located in the Dahanu taluka.

== Demographics ==
According to the 2011 census of India, Patilpada has 569 households. The effective literacy rate (i.e. the literacy rate of population excluding children aged 6 and below) is 47.21%.

Demographics (2011 Census)
	Total	Male	Female
Population	2895	1476	1419
Children aged below 6 years	459	234	225
Scheduled caste	2	1	1
Scheduled tribe	2743	1384	1359
Literates	1150	687	463
Workers (all)	1303	830	473
Main workers (total)	1273	812	461
Main workers: Cultivators	172	130	42
Main workers: Agricultural labourers	422	204	218
Main workers: Household industry workers	5	5	0
Main workers: Other	674	473	201
Marginal workers (total)	30	18	12
Marginal workers: Cultivators	10	7	3
Marginal workers: Agricultural labourers	9	3	6
Marginal workers: Household industry workers	0	0	0
Marginal workers: Others	11	8	3
Non-workers	1592	646	946
