= Sanskriti Museums =

India museum

Sanskriti Museum
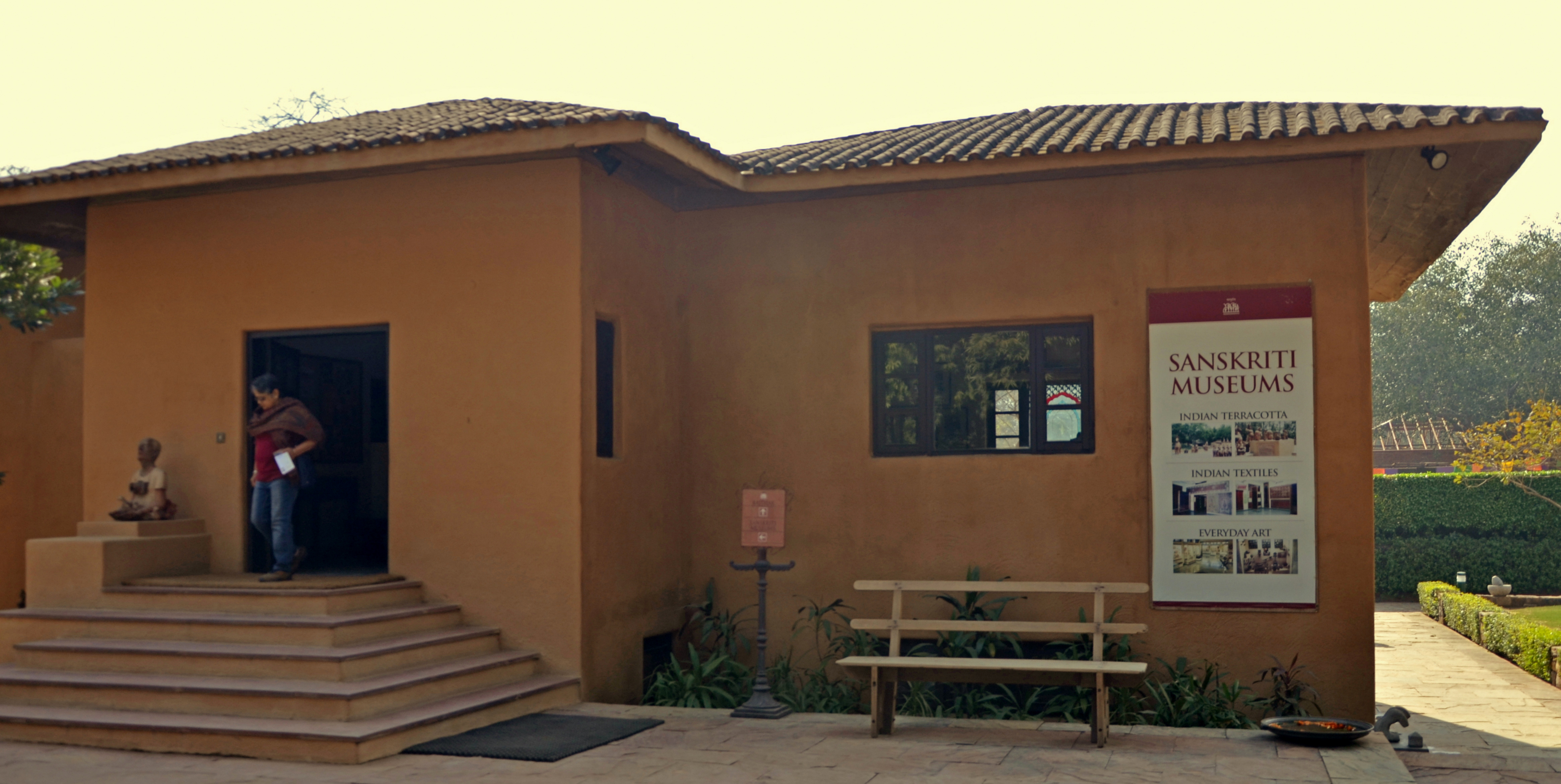
- Established: 1990
- Location: Sanskriti Kendra, Anandagram, Mehrauli–Gurgaon Road; Delhi, India
- Coordinates: 28.538457°N 77.184640°E
- Curator: O. P. Jain
- Website: Official website

Sanskriti Museums are a set of three museums namely, Museum of ‘Everyday Art’, Museum of Indian Terracotta (tribal art) and Textile Museum. It is housed within Sanskriti Kendra complex, at Anandagram, an artist village complex, spread over eight acres, situated 10 km south of New Delhi, near Aya Nagar on Mehrauli–Gurgaon Road, on the outskirts of Delhi. The nearest Delhi Metro station is Arjan Garh, on the Yellow Line.

The museum was founded by O. P. Jain in 1990, under the aegis of the Sanskriti Foundation, a New Delhi–based non-profit organisation established in 1978.

== Sanskriti Foundation ==
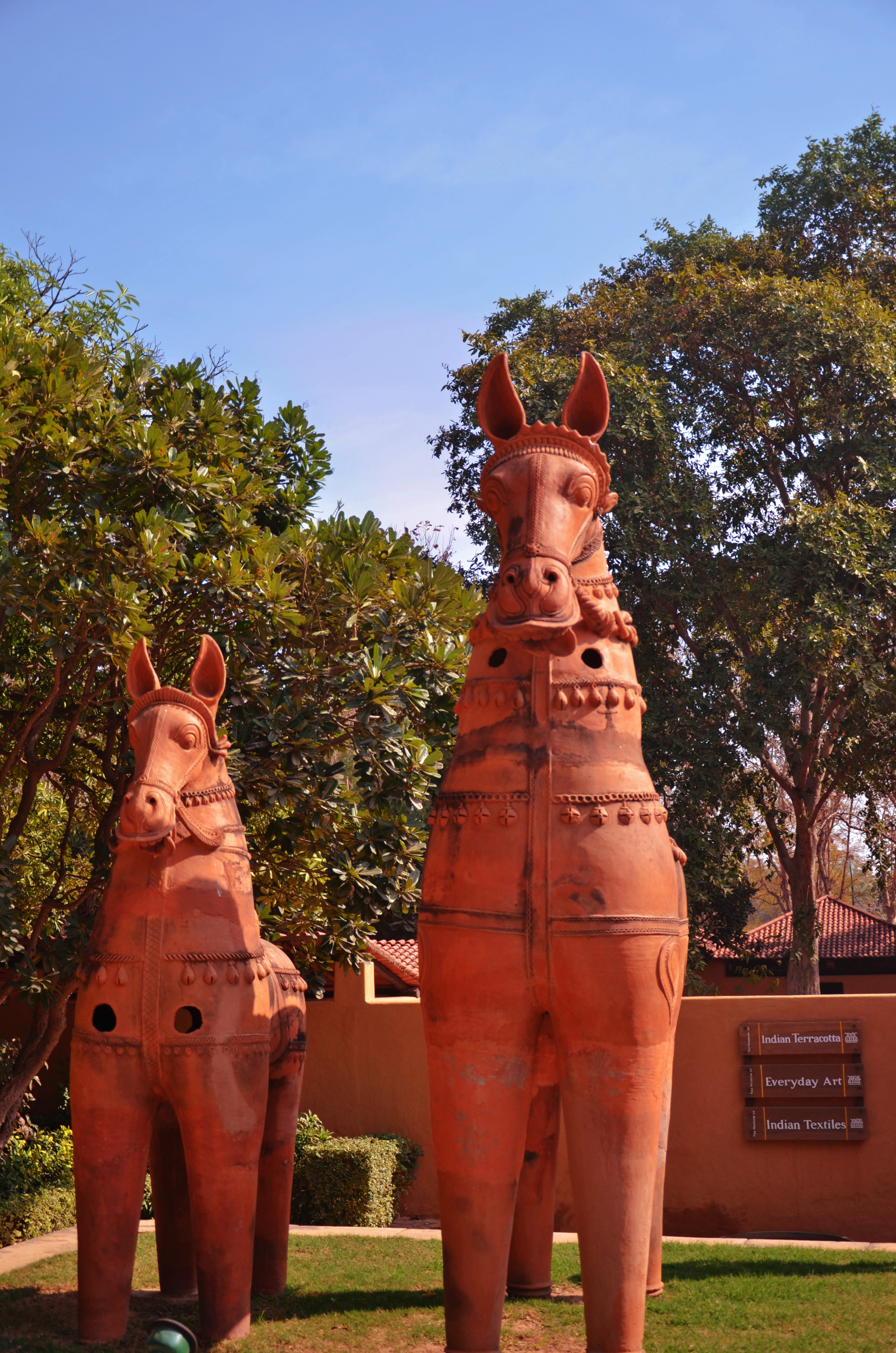
Terracotta horses, companions of Aiyanar, Tamil village God. Sanskriti Museum

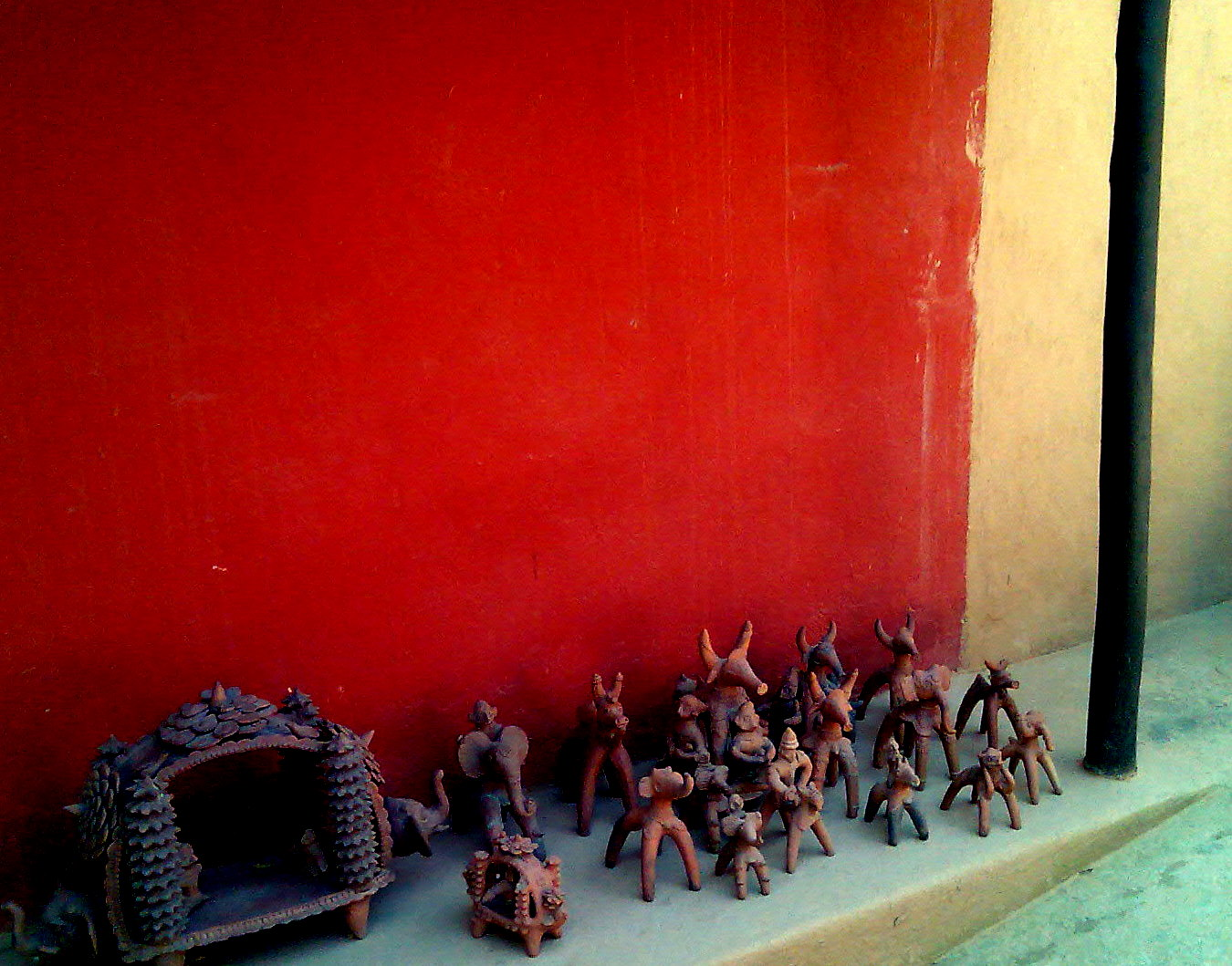
New Delhi

Sanskriti Pratishthan or Sanskriti Foundation is a non-profit culture and arts promotion organisation in Delhi set up in 1979, with O P Jain, L. M. Singhvi, Dr A M Singhvi and Sudarshan Agarwal as trustees. In the early years, it was largely privately funded by its members, later on it was received government funding, and from organisations like Indian Council for Cultural Relations (ICCR), and the Ford Foundation, and recently from the corporate sector. The construction of present Kendra premises began in 1989. Today the foundation also runs artist-in-residence programs here, and workshop for scholars, artists and craftsmen, plus it has residential studios, a library, an amphitheatre and an art gallery.

As its first project, the foundation instituted the 'Sanskriti Awards' in 1979, given to promising young talent in the group of 20–35 years, in five major fields, Literature, the Arts, Music, Dance, Theatre, Journalism and Social/Cultural Achievement. Next the Museum of Everyday Art established in 1984 contains items of everyday use. The foundation also runs 'Sanskriti Yatra' workshops on cultural awareness for school children. Its three- month residency programs is run residency programme in collaboration with UNESCO, Asia Link and the Fulbright Fellowships Program. Museumologist Jyotindra Jain is trustee and Director of the Foundation.

== Museum of Indian Terracotta ==
This Museum has over 1,500 objects of terracotta art, sculptures and figurines from the tribal areas of India, displayed in the backdrop of the respective tribal arts.

== Museum of Everyday Art ==
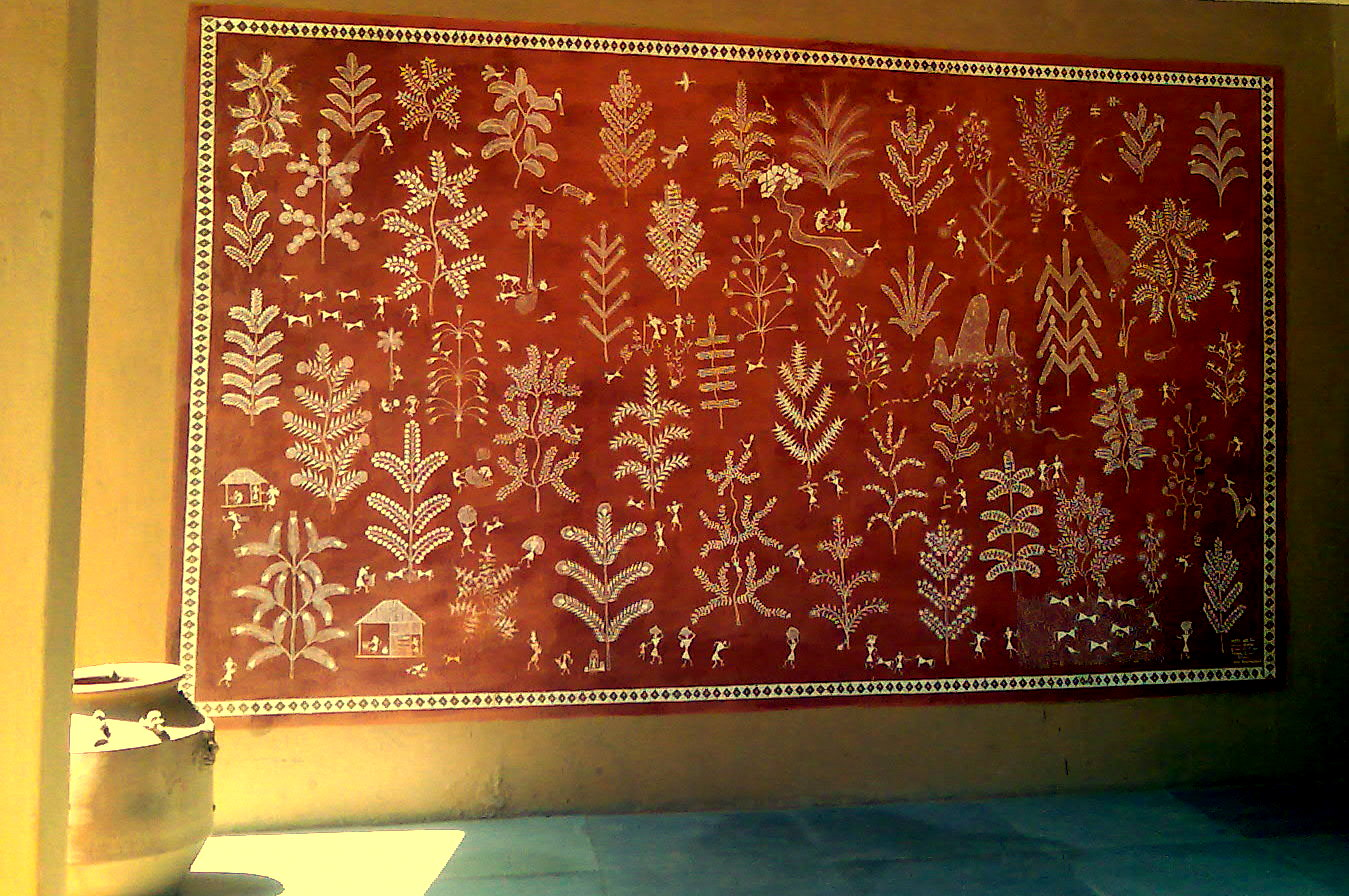
Warli Painting, at Sanskriti Kendra Museum

It houses a collection of what is called "Everyday Arts", where artisans turn the functional everyday household object like toys, nutcrackers, cups, saucers, spoons, and home shrines, articles of worship, into the works of art.

== Textile Museum ==
A showcase of Indian textile heritage.
