= Talasari =

- City
- Location in Maharashtra, India
- Coordinates: 20.122926290665855°N 72.91640316396301°E
- Country: India
- State: Maharashtra
- District: Palghar

Area
  - Total: 4 km^{2} (1.5 sq mi)
- Elevation: 44 m (144 ft)

Population (2001)
  - Total: 61,015
  - Density: 15,000/km^{2} (40,000/sq mi)

Languages
  - Official: Marathi
- Time zone: UTC+5:30 (IST)
- Postal code: 401606
- ISO 3166 code: IN-MH

Talasari is a village and a municipal council in Palghar district of India's Maharashtra state in Konkan division. It is one of the talukas of Palghar District.
