= Matheran railway station =

Hill Terminus of Matheran Light Railway

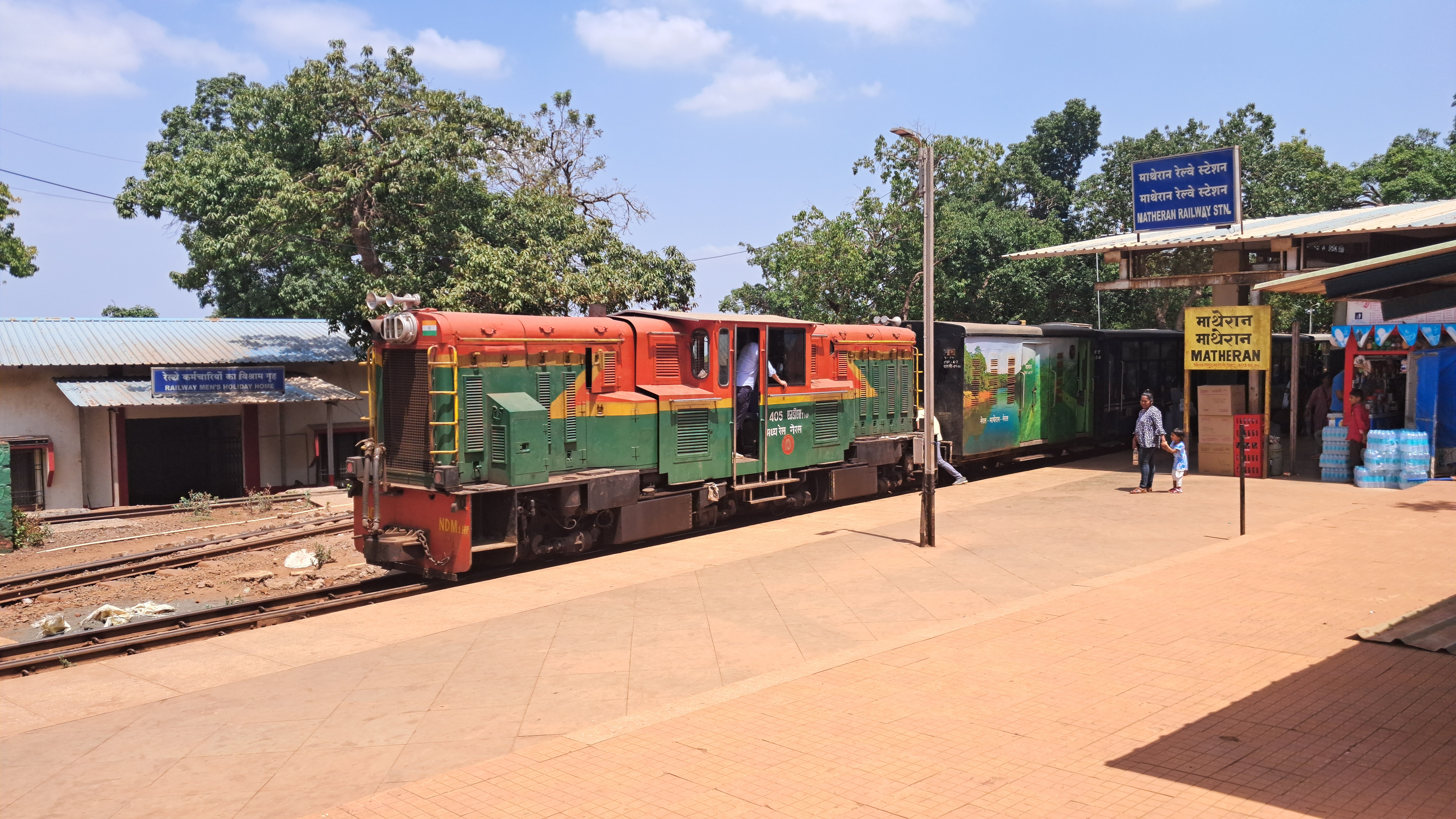

General information
- Location: India
- Coordinates: 18.989°N 73.271°E
- Line: Matheran Hill Railway

History
- Opened: 1907
Location

Matheran Railway Station is the upper terminus of the Matheran Hill Railway (MHR). It is the fifth and last station of the narrow gauge line.

== Station ==
The station is at an elevation of approximately 2,625 feet (800 m) in the Western Ghats. As no automobiles are allowed in Matheran it provides the sole mechanised means of transport, the alternative being walking or horseback from the previous station Aman Lodge, some 3 km distant., with trains to Neral suspended.

== Heritage ==
The Station buildings, depot and railway infrastructure at Matheran are all mentioned in the UNESCO nomination tentative list for the Matheran Light Railway. No. 741, an ML class steam locomotive that originally worked the line is preserved on a plinth at Matheran station. An old bell dated 1907 hangs outside the station office. It has the inscriptions: 'J.Warner London | 1907'

== Gallery ==
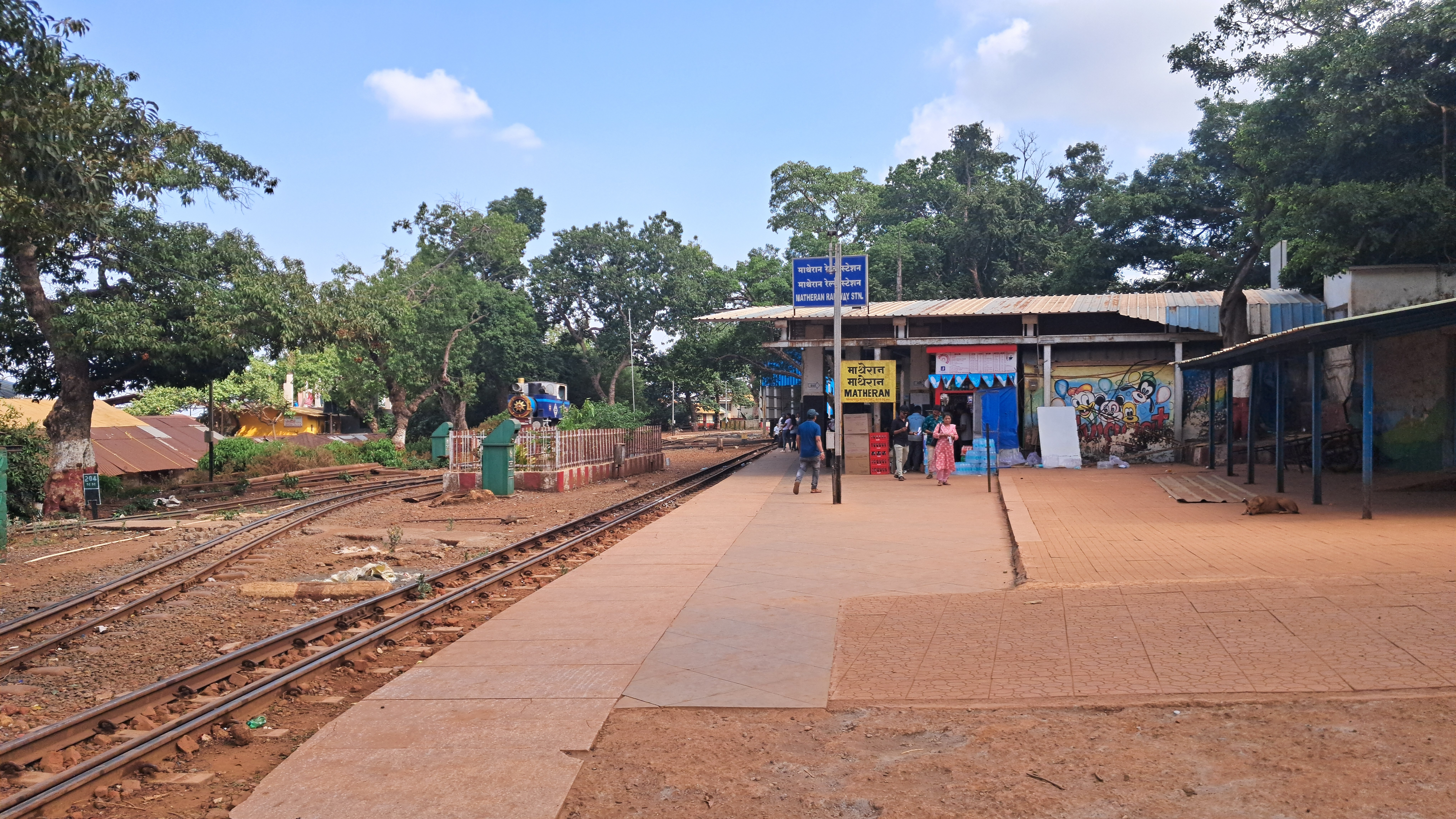
Matheran Railway Stationː view from platform end

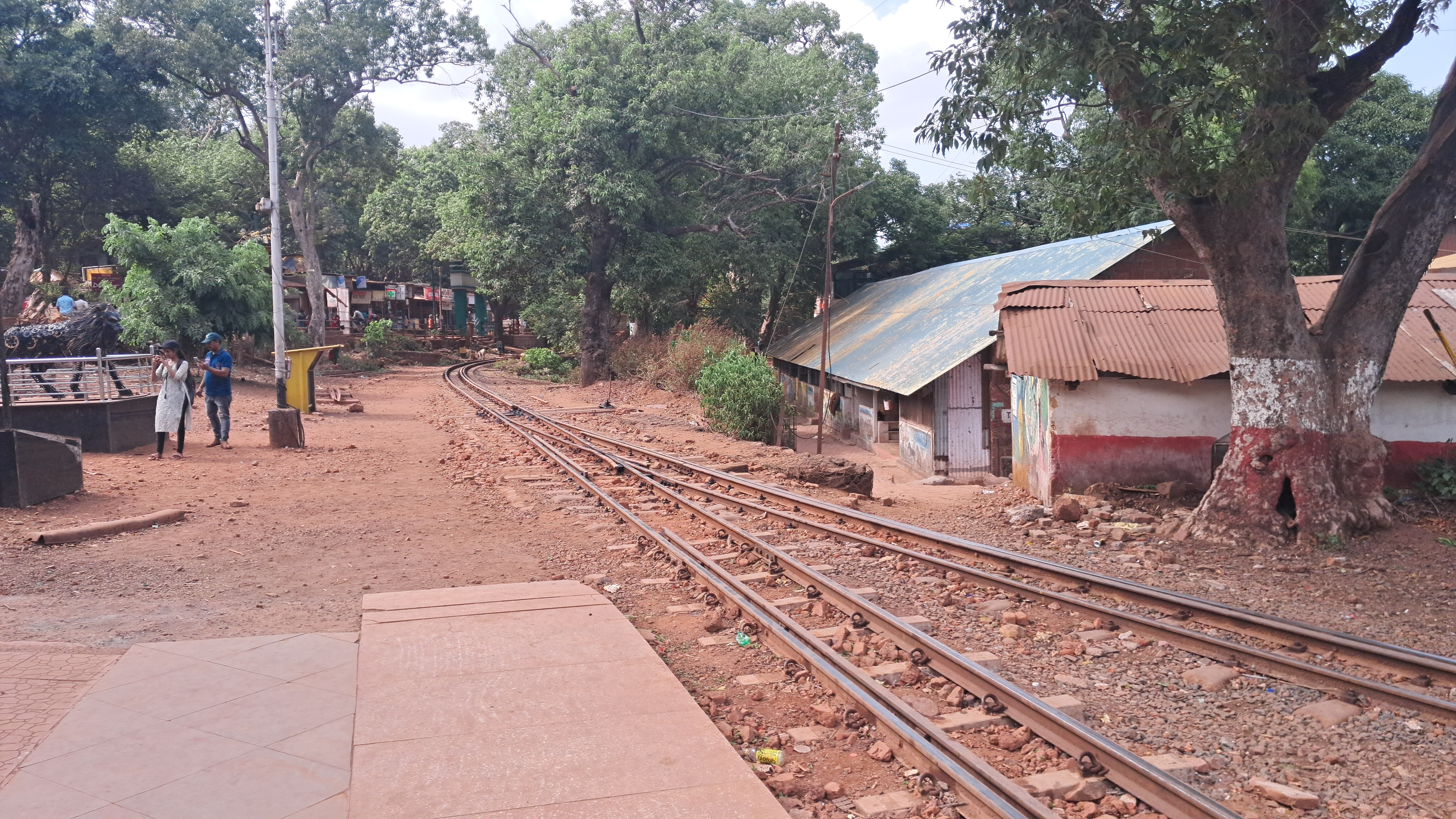
Tracks into Matheran Railway Station

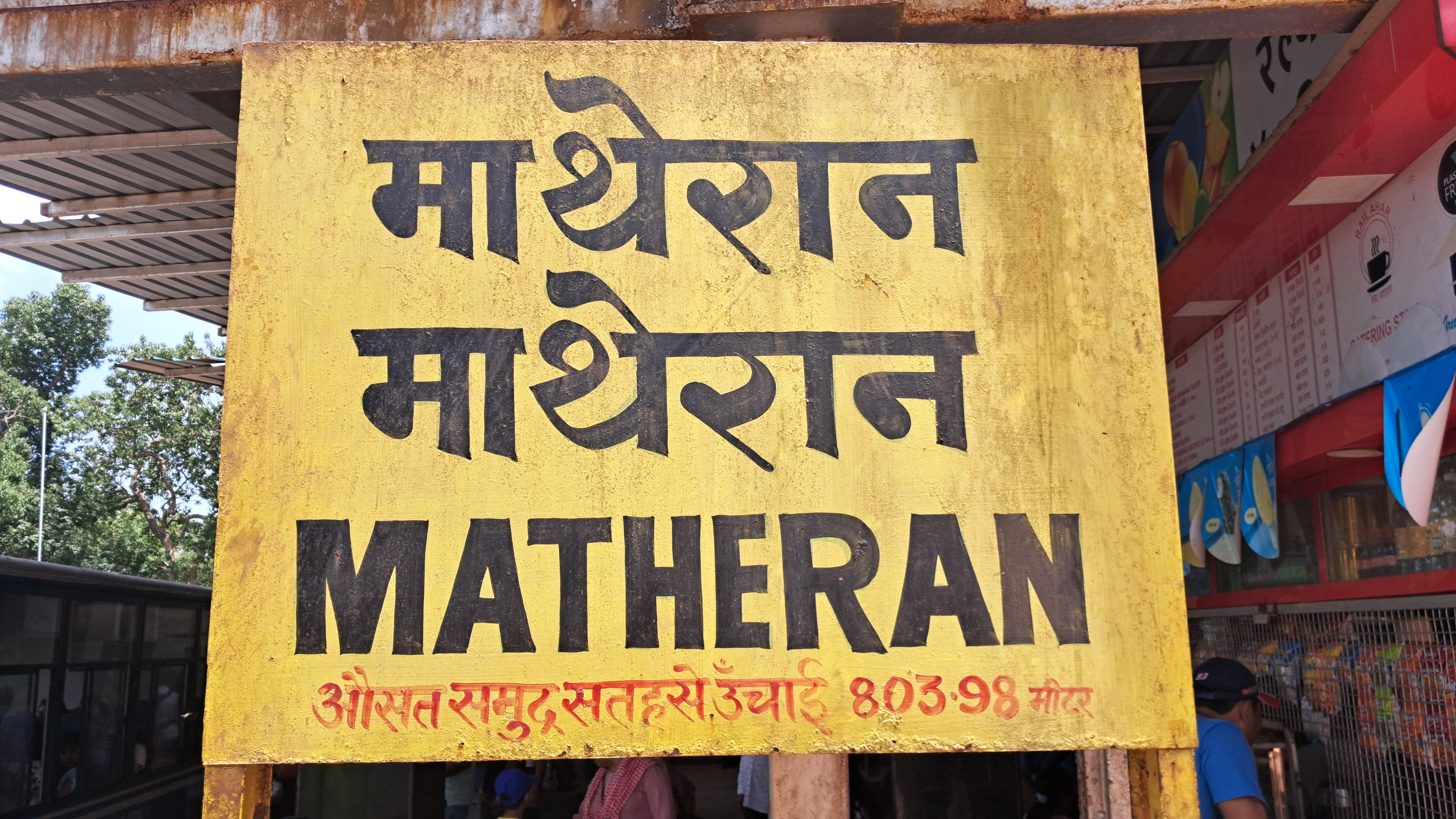
Platform Board of Matheran Railway Station

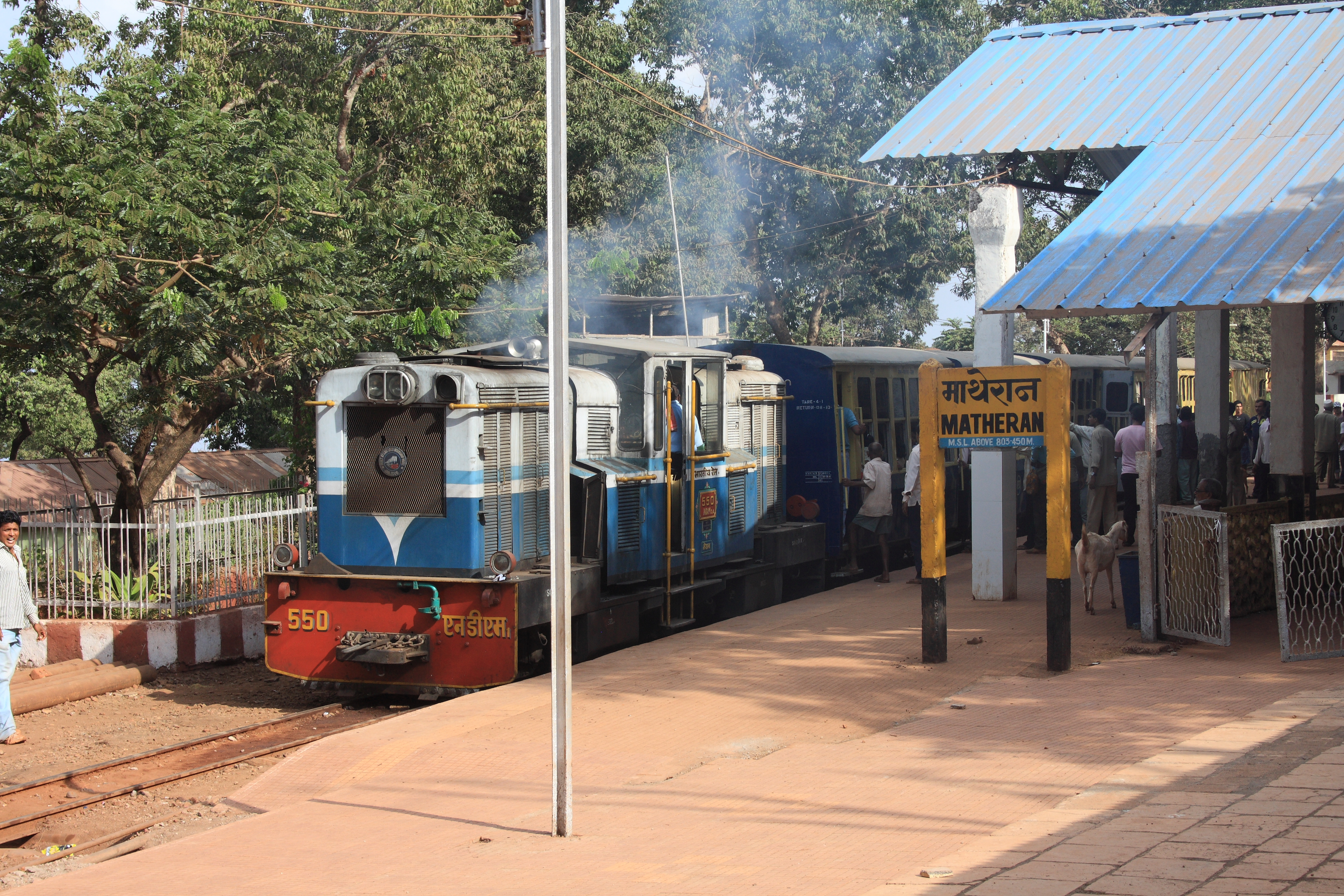
Old image of a train at the station

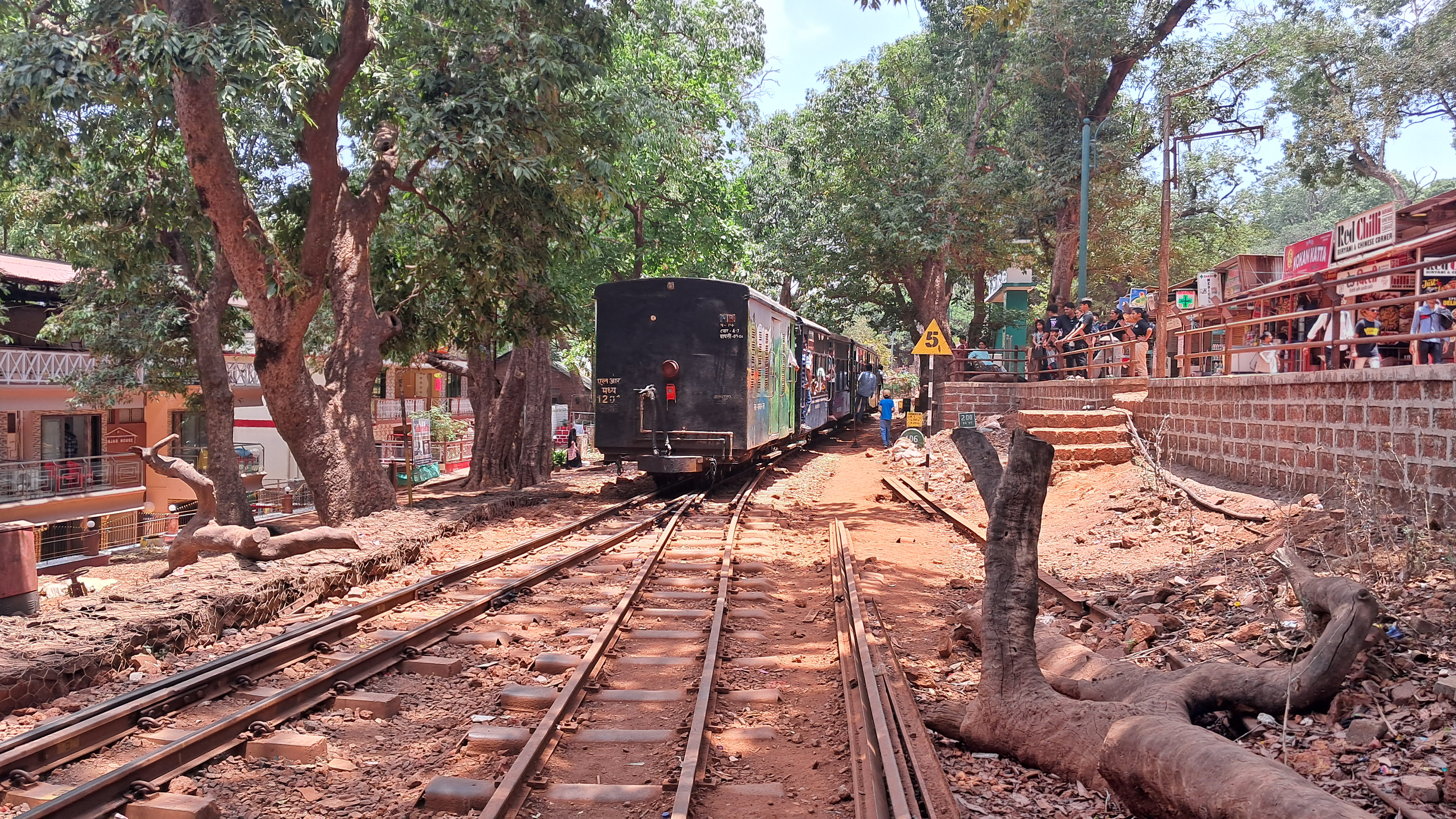
A Train entering Matheran Station

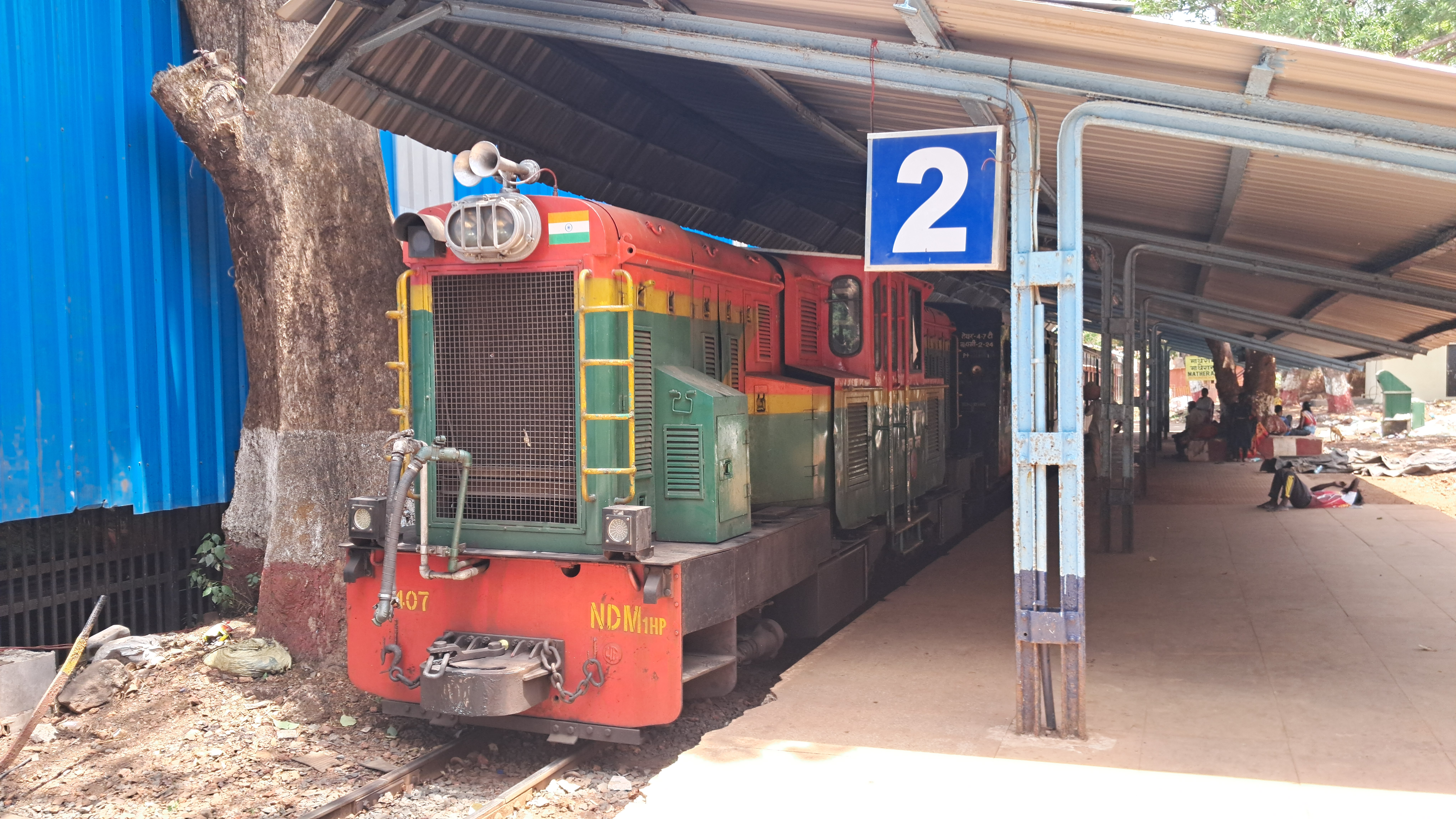
A Train halted at Platform no.2 of Matheran Station

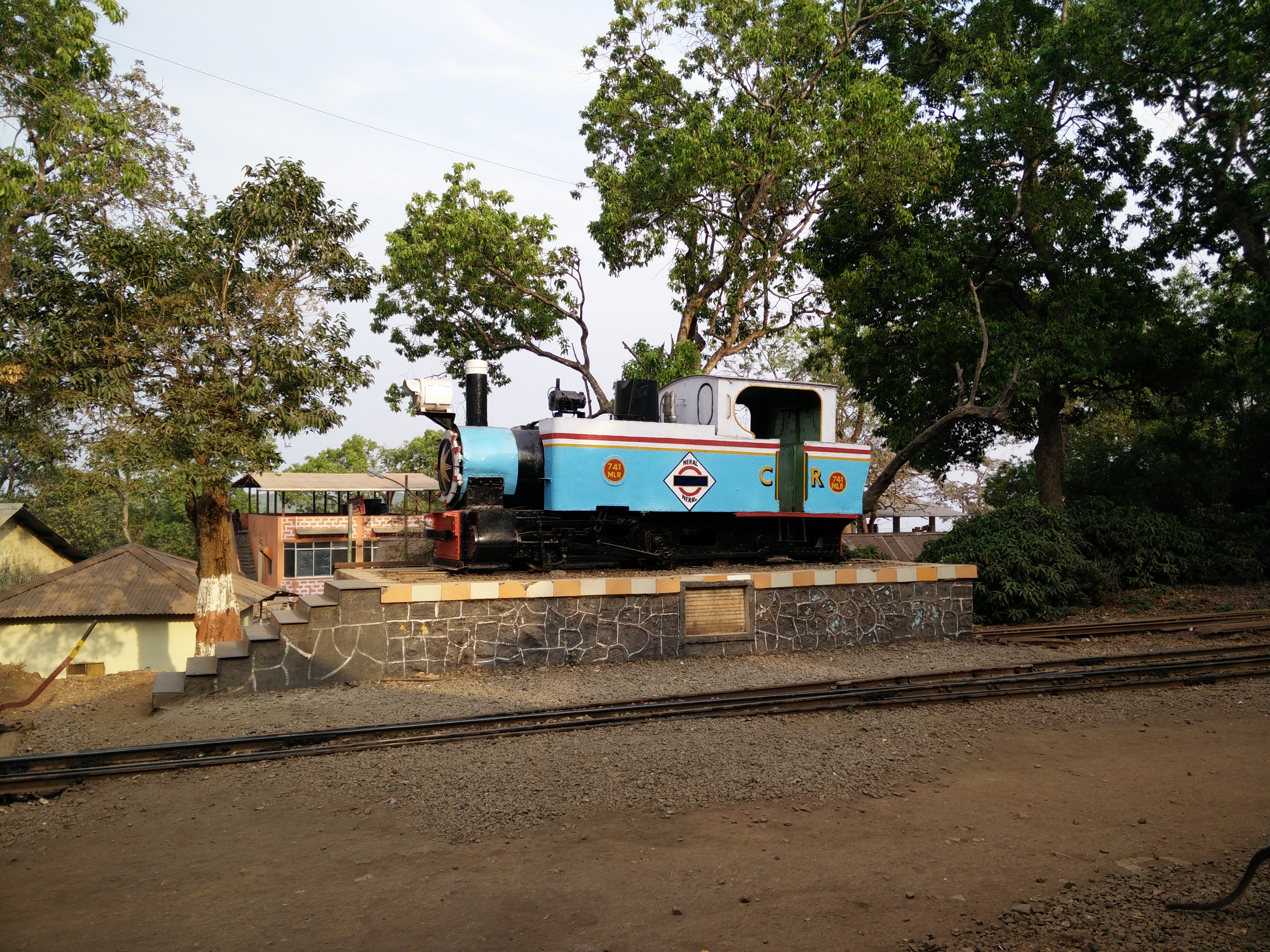
MLR No. 741 at Matheran station

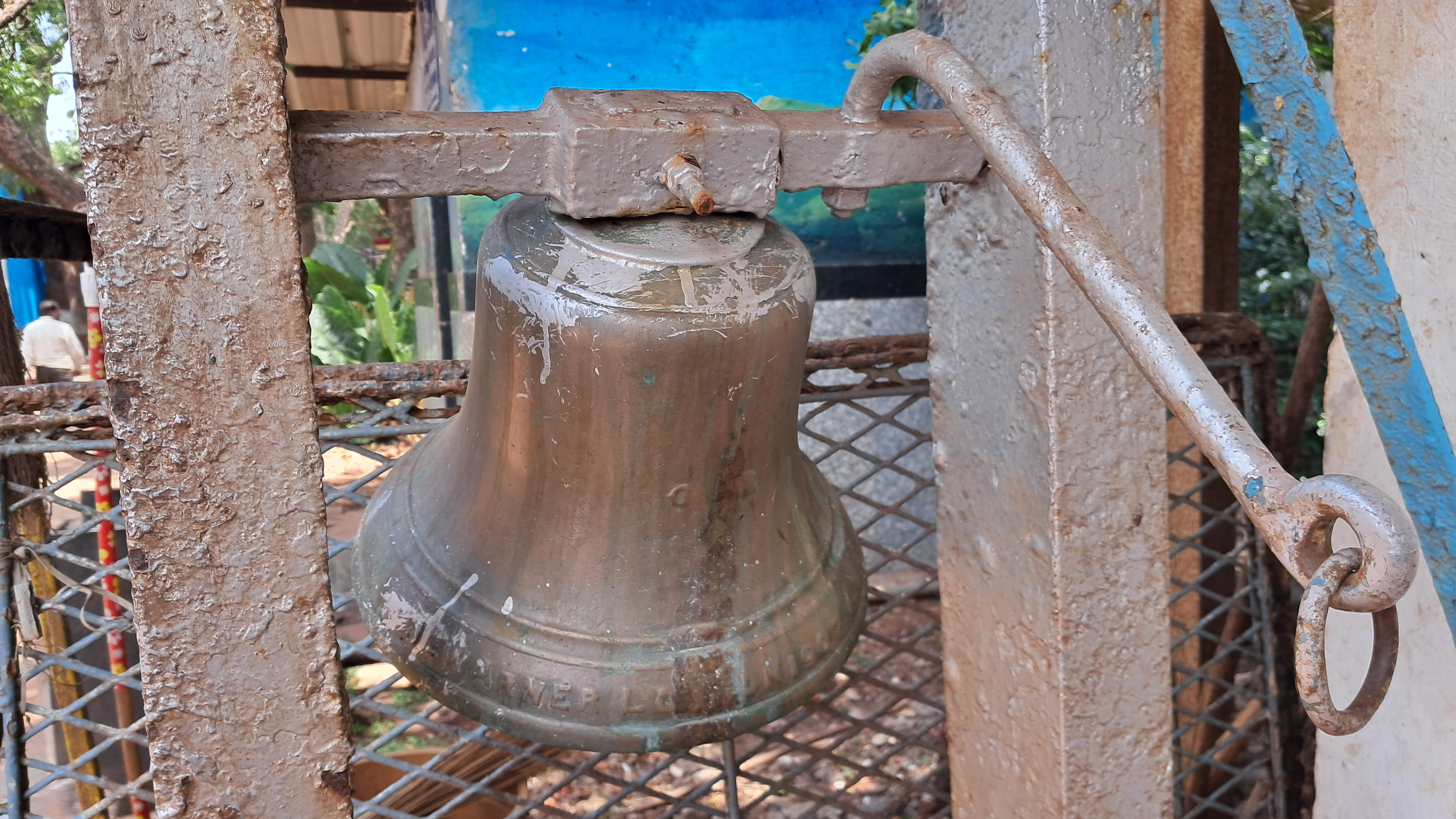
A Bell dated 1907 at Matheran Station

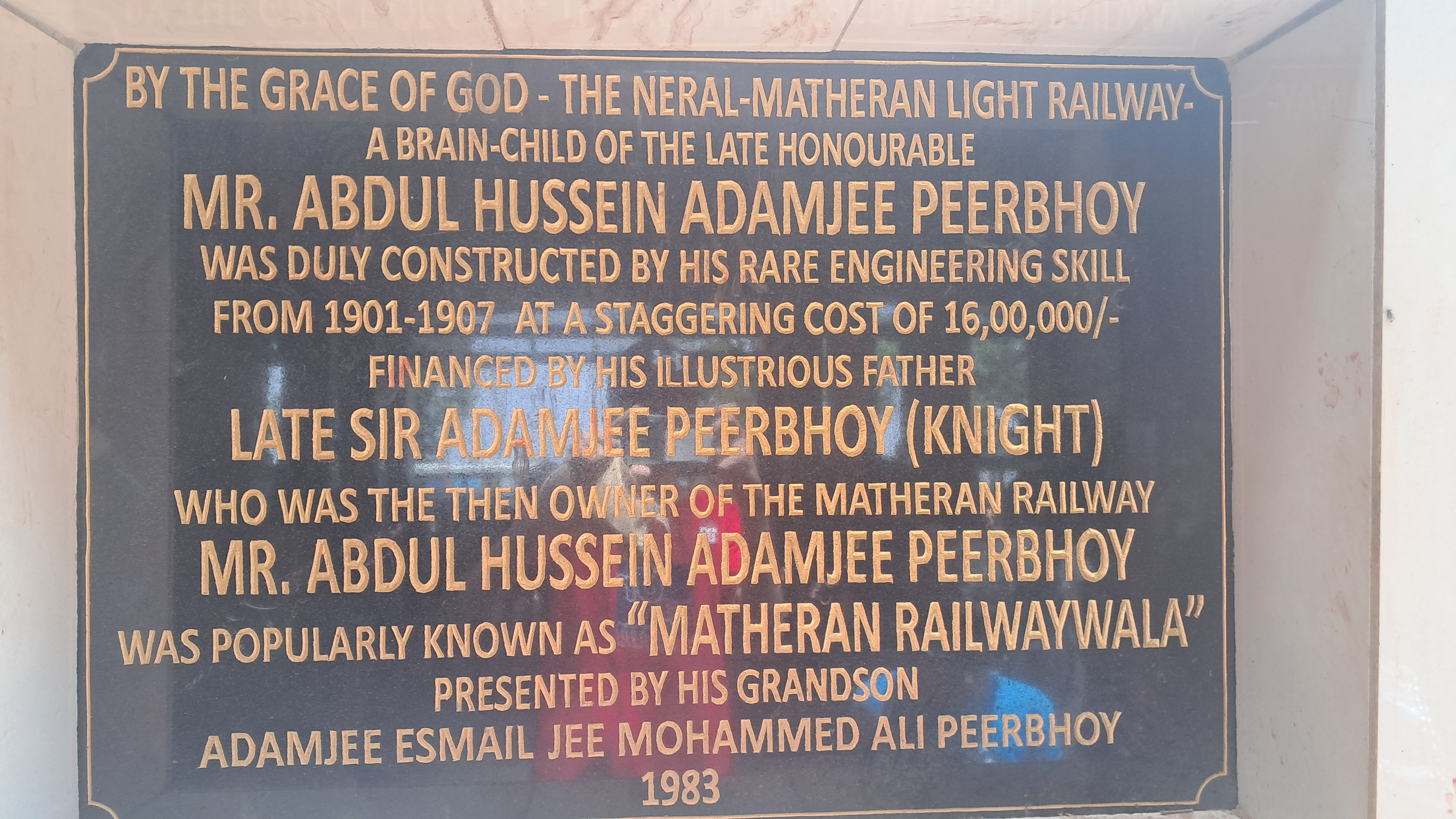
A Commemoration Plaque at Matheran Railway Station
