= Poshir =

Village in Maharashtra

- village
- Location in Maharashtra, India Poshir (India)
- Coordinates: 19.0509°N 73.2202°E
- Country: India
- State: Maharashtra
- District: Raigad
- Talukas: Karjat

Languages
  - Official: Marathi
- Time zone: UTC+5:30 (IST)
- Postal code: 410101

Poshir is a village near the city of Neral, in the state of Maharashtra, India.

== Geography ==
Poshir is located in the taluka of Karjat in Raigad district in the state of Maharashtra. It is 21 km north-east from the main Town Karjat, 09 km from Neral, 59.7 km from its District Main City Raigad and 60 km from its state capital Mumbai. It falls on the road connecting Karjat and Murbad.

== Demographics ==
=== 2011 ===
As of the 2011 census, there were 2,532 people and 500 households residing in Poshir. The overall literacy rate at that time was 83.9%.

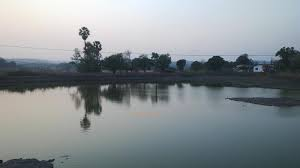
Poshir Pond

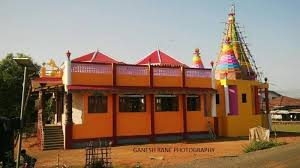
Poshir Temple
