= Ambivali Caves =

Buddhist caves in Raigad district, India

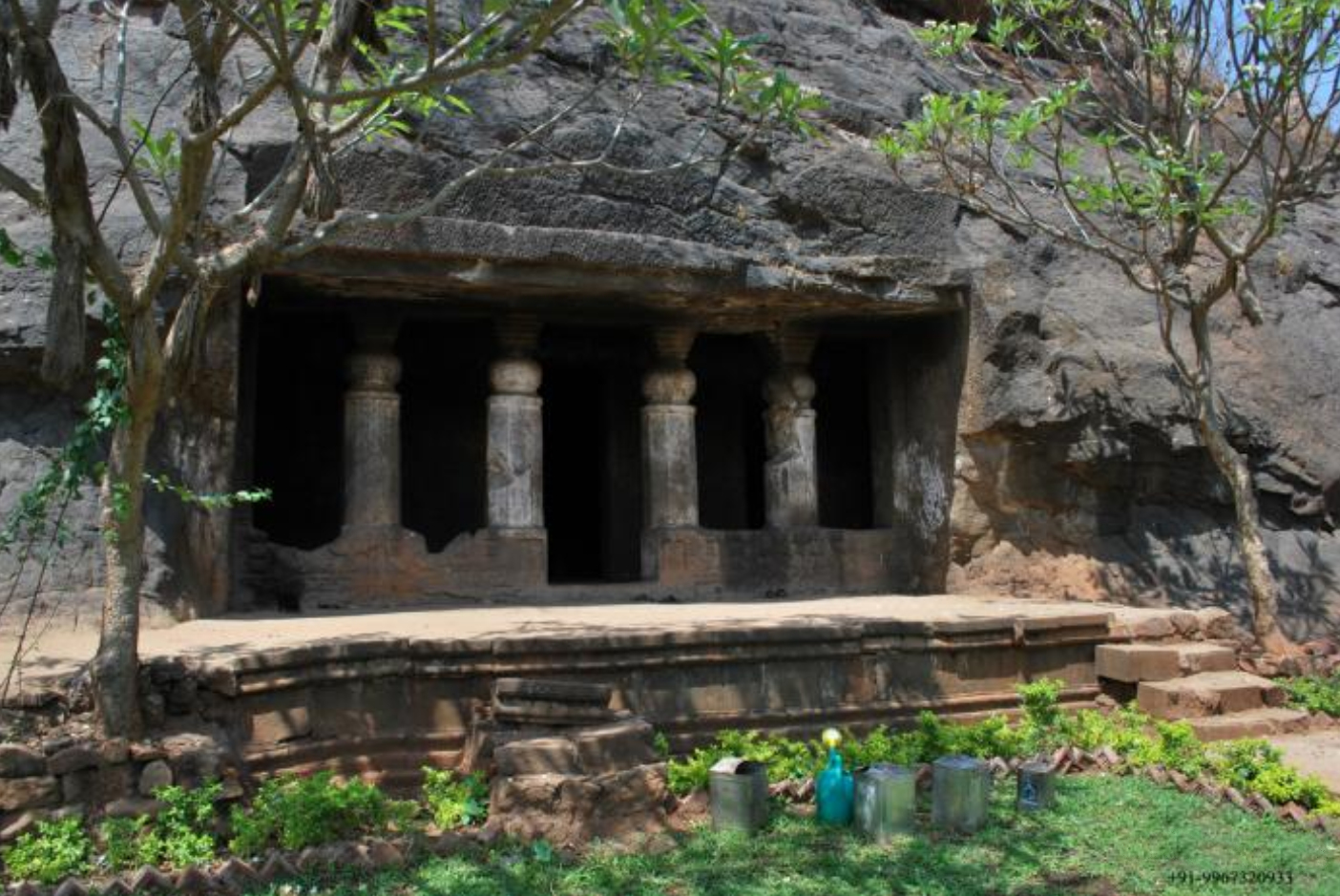
- Ambivali Caves

- Location within India
- 19.0186684°N 73.497052°E

The Ambivali Caves, or Ambivali Leni, are a group of Buddhist caves near Neral, Raigad district, Maharashtra, 8km southeast of Kalyan. The caves are cut in the low hill located on the concave portion of a river. They consist in 12 viharas celles with verandah and several water cisterns. There is one inscription in Brahmi script on a verandah pillar.
