= Jummapatti railway station =

Railway station in Maharashtra, India

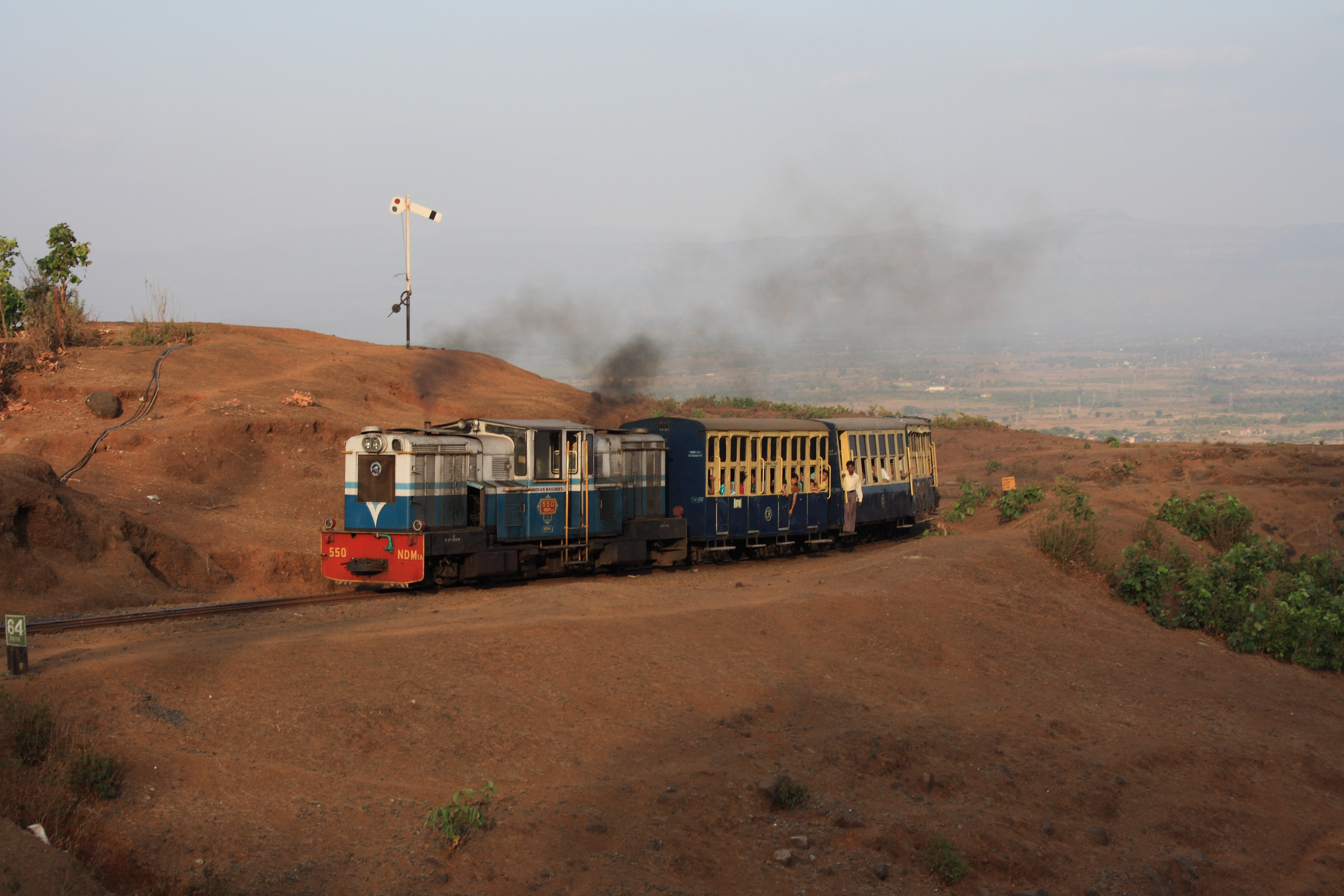
Train near Jummapatti station

Jummapatti railway station is a railway station on the Neral–Matheran railway line of the Matheran Hill Railway. The station is about 4.8 km from Neral railway station.
