= Matheran Hill Railway =

Heritage rail line in India

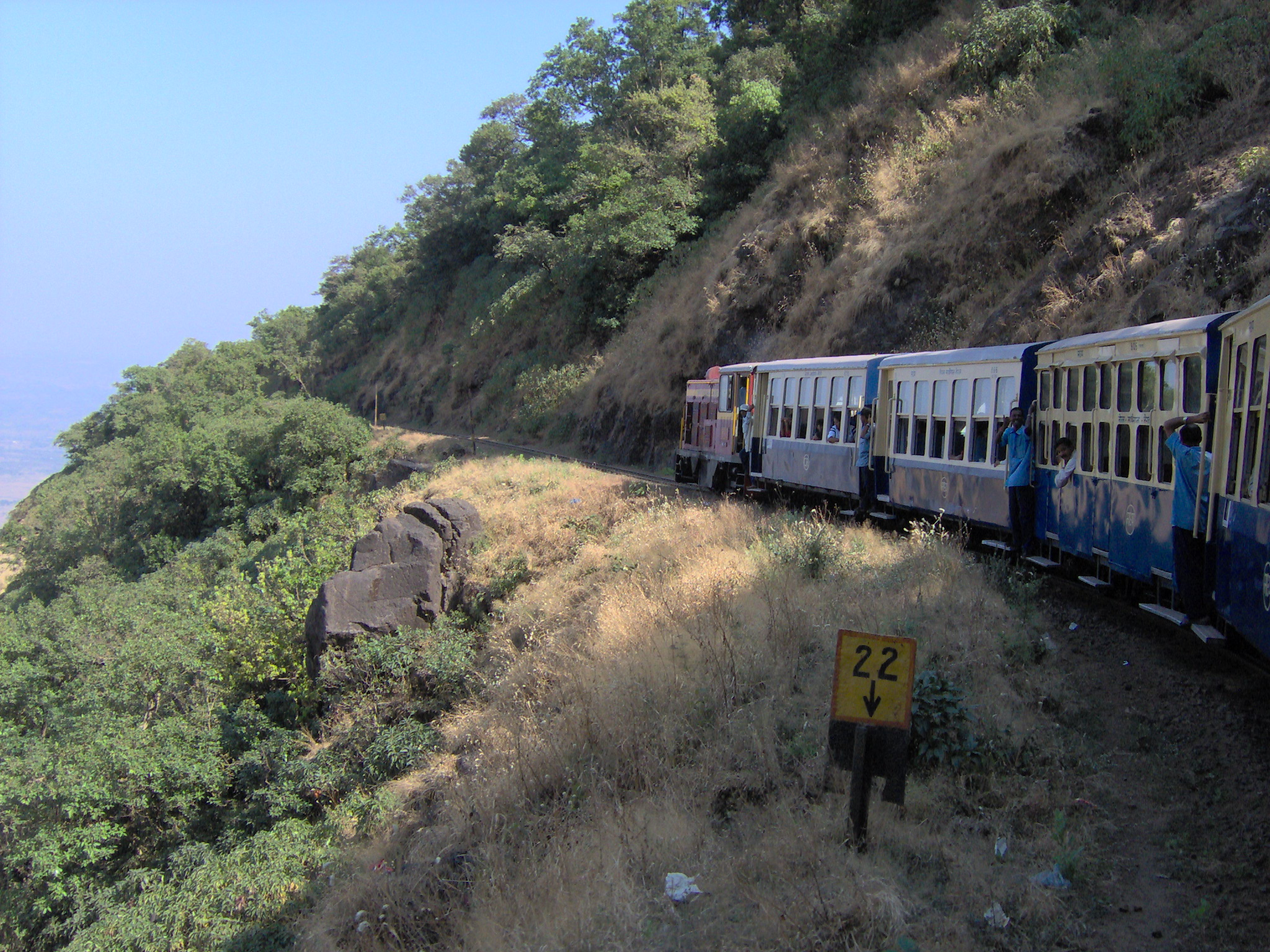
- MHR train
- Terminus: Matheran

Commercial operations
- Built by: Adamjee Peerbhoy

Preserved operations
- Operated by: Central Railways
- Length: 21 km (13 mi)
- Preserved gauge: 2 ft (610 mm)

Commercial history
- Opened: 1907

Preservation history
- Headquarters: Neral

The Matheran Hill Railway (MHR) is a 2 ft (610 mm) narrow-gauge heritage railway in Maharashtra, India, which is administered by the Central Railway zone. It covers a distance of 21 km (13 mi), connecting Neral to Matheran in the Western Ghats. The MHR is on the tentative list of UNESCO World Heritage Sites.

== History ==
The Neral–Matheran Light Railway was built between 1901 and 1907 by Abdul Hussein Adamjee Peerbhoy and financed by his father, Sir Adamjee Peerbhoy, at a cost of Rupees 16,00,000. Adamjee Peerbhoy visited Matheran often, and wanted to build a railway to make it easier to get there. Hussain's plans for the Matheran Hill Railway were formulated in 1900, and construction began in 1904. The consulting engineer was Everard Calthrop. The line was open to traffic by 1907. Its tracks were originally 30 lb/yd (14.9 kg/m) rails, but were upgraded to 42 lb/yd (20.8 kg/m) rails. The ruling gradient is 1:20 (five percent), with tight curves, and speed is limited to 12 km/h (7.5 mph).

When the railway was opened, the rolling stock consisted of just two locomotives, fifteen First Class, two Third Class coaches, two luggage vans with postal accommodation, twelve open goods wagons, along with two saloons that were in verge of completion at GIPR's Parel Locomotive Workshops. One Locomotive was taken from the Darjeeling Himalayan Railway as well.

Around 1907, only one locomotive would run on the railway at a time. The service had two trains each way per day.

The railway was closed because of flood damage in 2005 and was not expected to reopen before April 2007. However, the first run on the repaired railway was on 5 March 2007. The line observed its centenary on 15 April of that year. Service had been suspended during the monsoon season (from June to October) because of the danger of landslides. During the 2012 monsoon season, Central Railway (CR) tested the railway's air brakes and, after approval from the Commission of Railway Safety, ran the train during the monsoon for the first time. CR planned to shorten the monsoon service suspension to 15 July – 1 October.

In November 2012, CR added a special coach (known as a saloon) to trains operating on the line. The saloons have sofas and LCD screens showing images from outside the train. The saloons had been available only to railway officers.

== Operator ==
The MHR and its assets, including the stations, line, and vehicles, belong to the Government of India and are entrusted to the Ministry of Railways. Central Railway handles day-to-day maintenance and management, and several programs, divisions, and departments of Indian Railways are responsible for repairs.

== Rolling stock ==
=== Steam locomotives ===
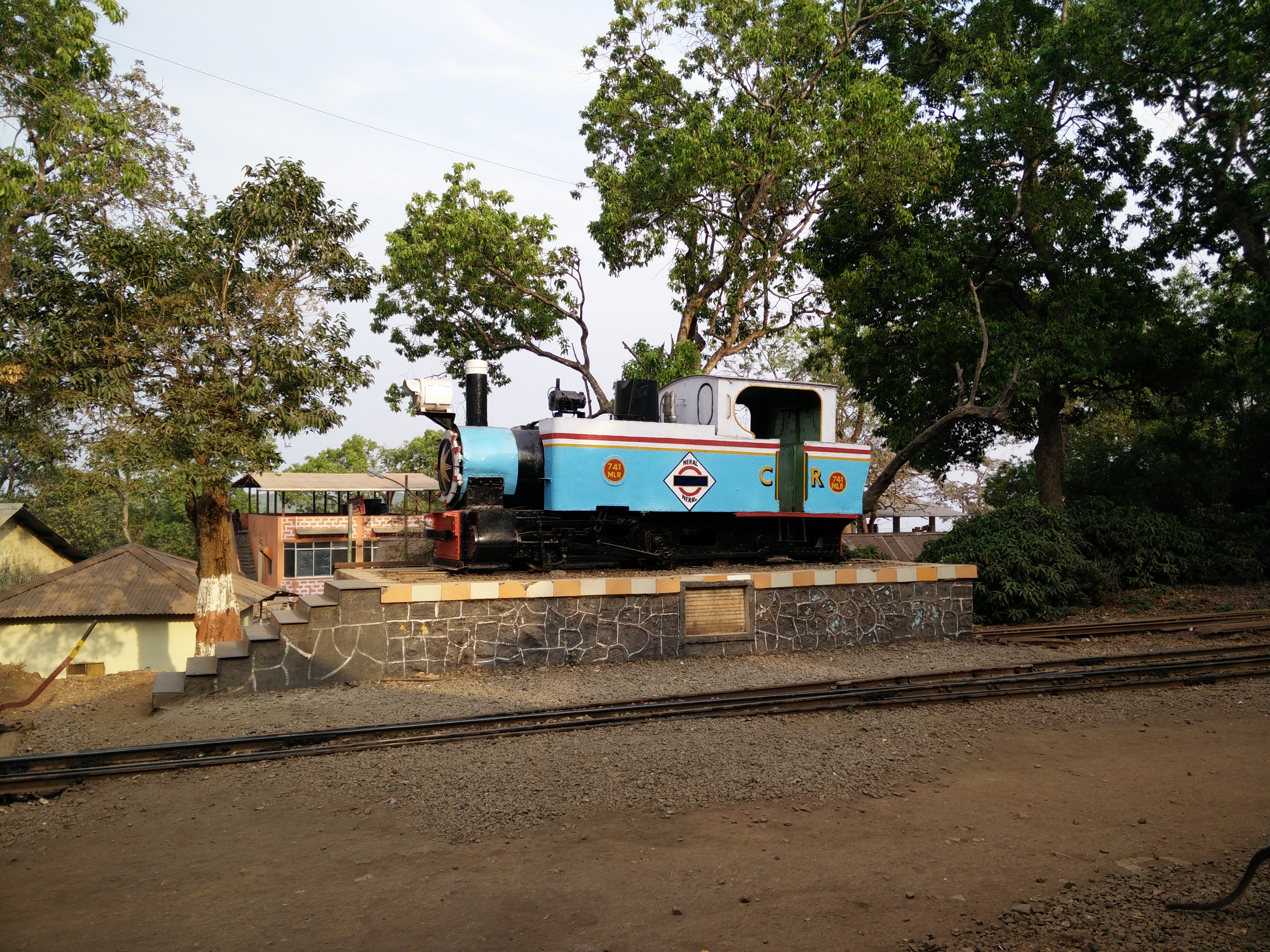
Steam locomotive MLR-741 on display at the Matheran station

Consulting engineer Everard Calthrop designed the MLR Class 0-6-0Ts with Klien-Lindner axles to give a flexible wheelbase and four were supplied by Orenstein & Koppel. They ran from the railway's opening in 1907 until 1982, when they were replaced by diesel engines. By 1983, all steam locomotives were phased out. A B-class locomotive (#794) from the Darjeeling Himalayan Railway was transferred to the Neral–Matheran line in 2001 to test the feasibility of steam excursions. It was sent to the Golden Rock workshops for conversion to oil firing in 2013, and returned to Neral soon afterwards. Rail enthusiasts can once again enjoy and witness the 'steam-engine' on the Neral-Matheran toy train route. The steam engine will be fired either by electric power or hydrogen. Minister of Railways, Ashwini Vaishnaw informed that an electric and hydrogen propelled engine will be given the appearance of the old steam engine.

Locomotive no. 738 is plinthed at the southern end of Neral Toy Train station, in a small garden. It was the engine in which Sir Abdul Hussein Adamjee Peerbhoy traveled, when he visited Germany to order the original four locomotives. (according to a plaque on the locomotive). No. 739 is preserved in the National Rail Museum, New Delhi, while No. 740 is currently under overhaul by the Darnall Locomotive and Railway Heritage Trust. No.741 is plinthed at Matheran Railway Station.

MHR No.	Builder	Builder No.	From	Location
738	O & K	1766	1905	Neral
739	O & K	2342	1907	Delhi
740	O & K	2343	1907	Darnall Locomotive and Railway Heritage Trust
741	O & K	1767	1905	Matheran
794	Baldwin	44914	1917	Neral

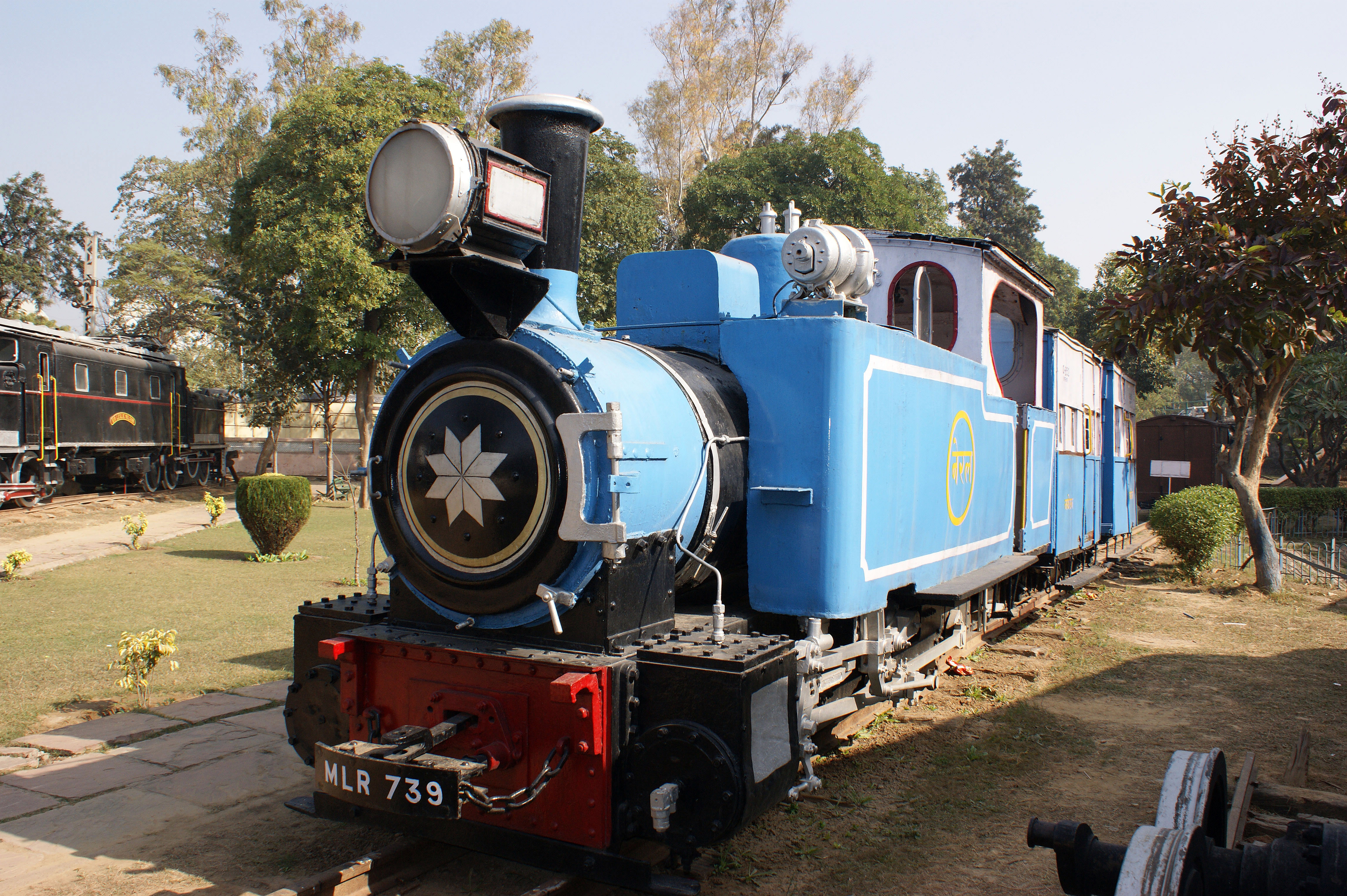
Locomotive MLR-739

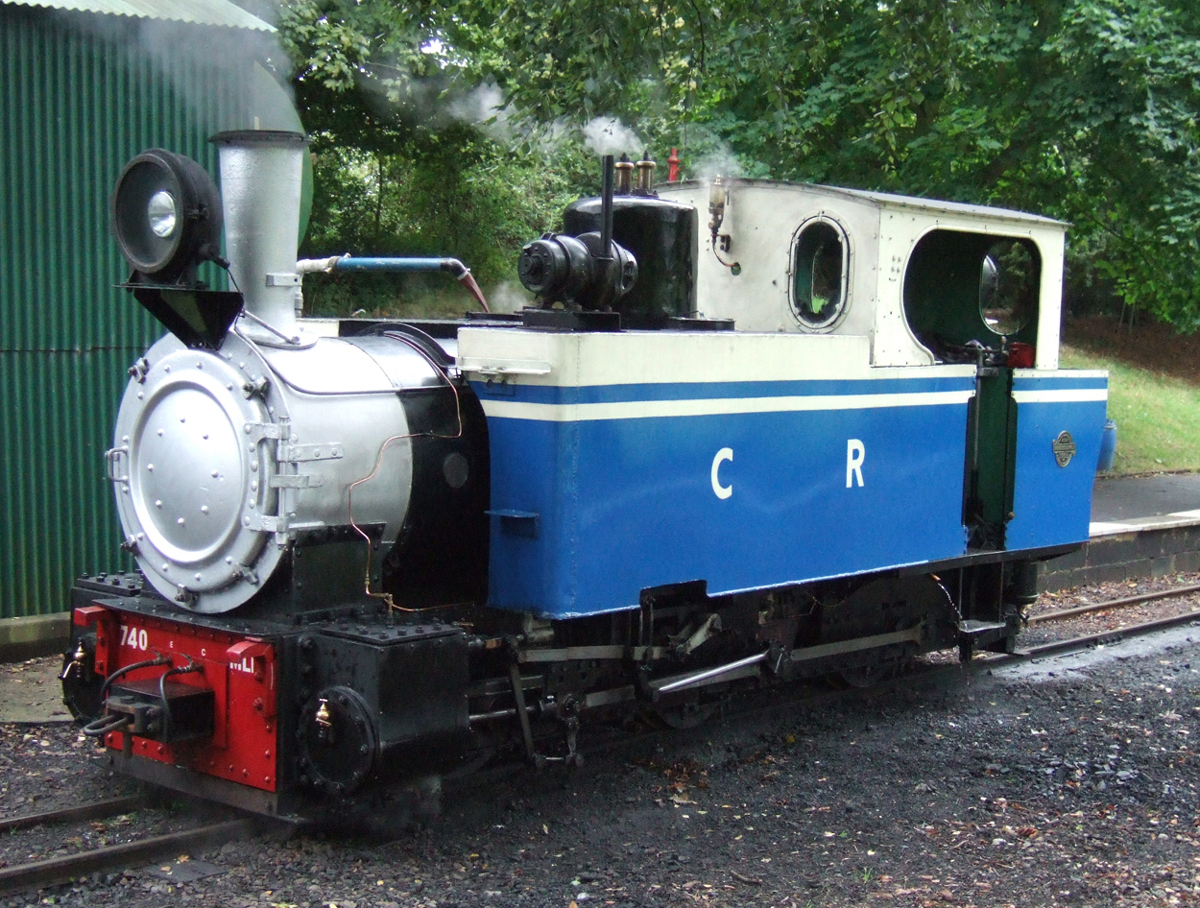
Locomotive MLR-740

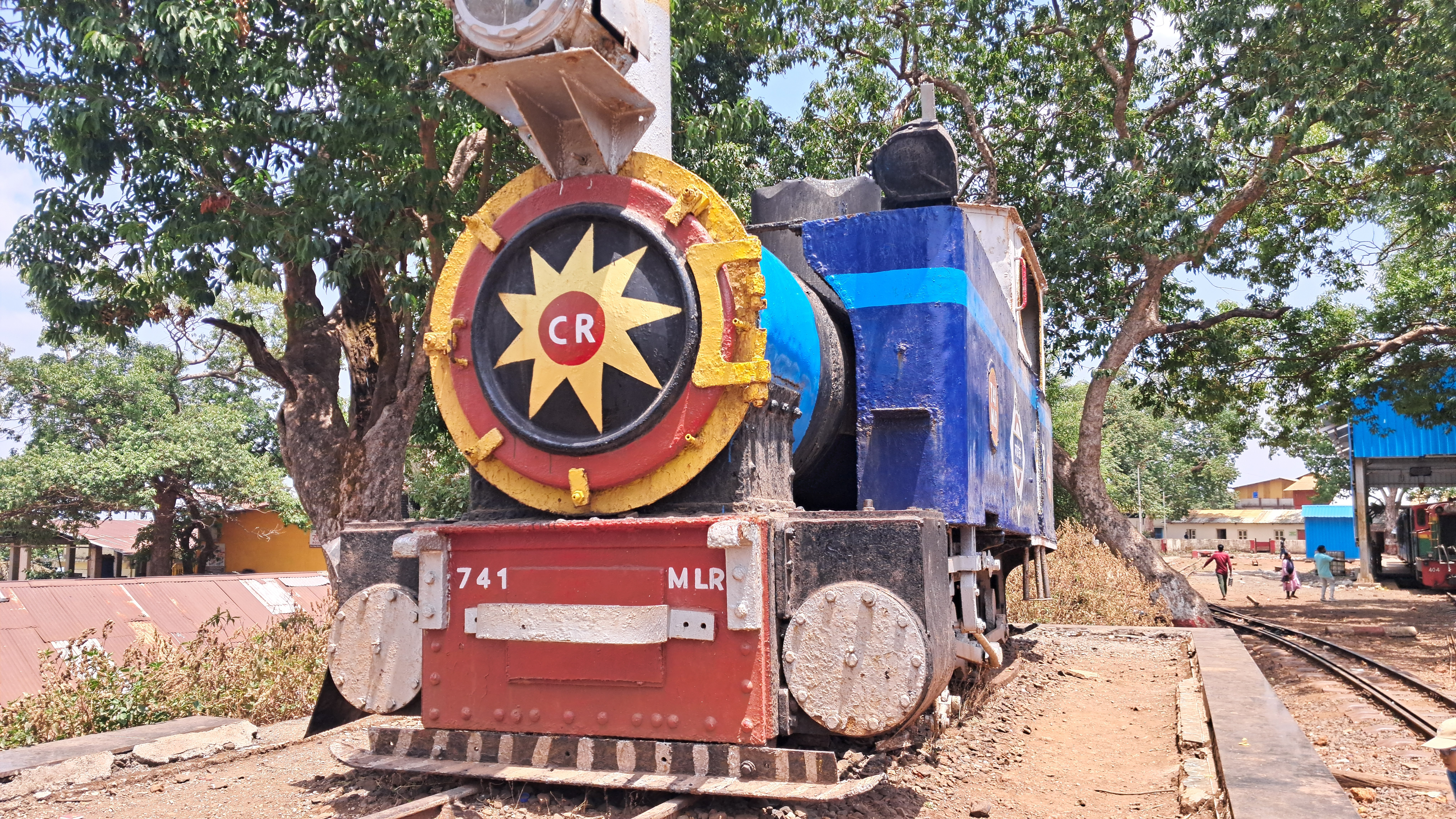
Locomotive MLR-741

=== Diesel locomotives ===
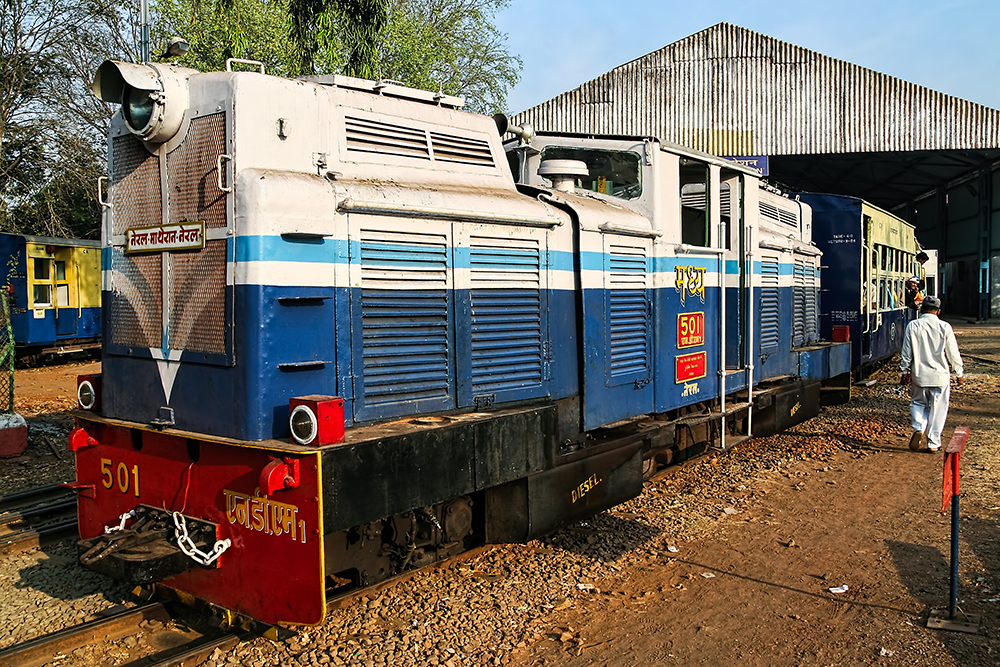
NDM1 diesel locomotive No.501 at Neral Station

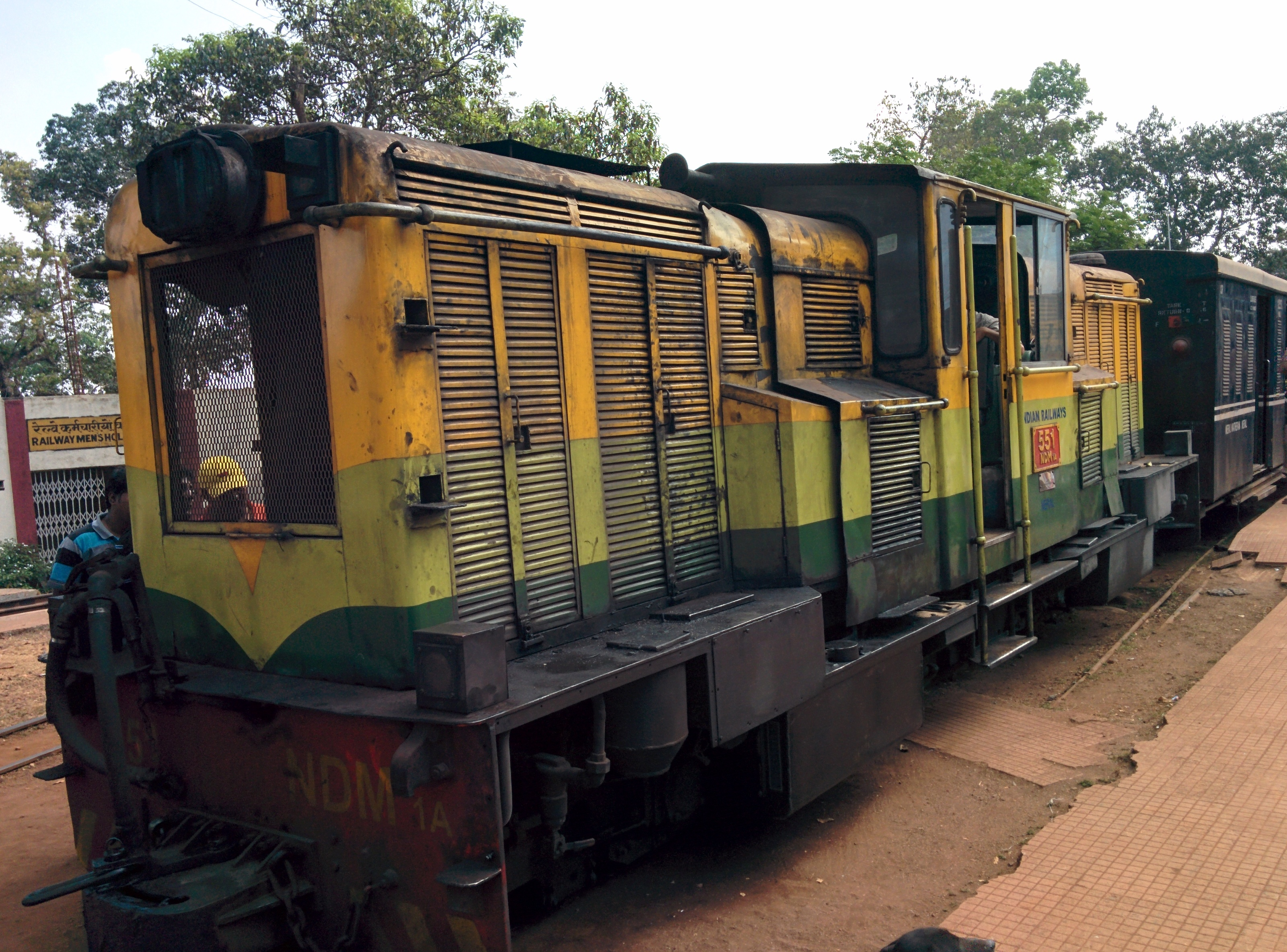
NDM1A diesel locomotive No.551

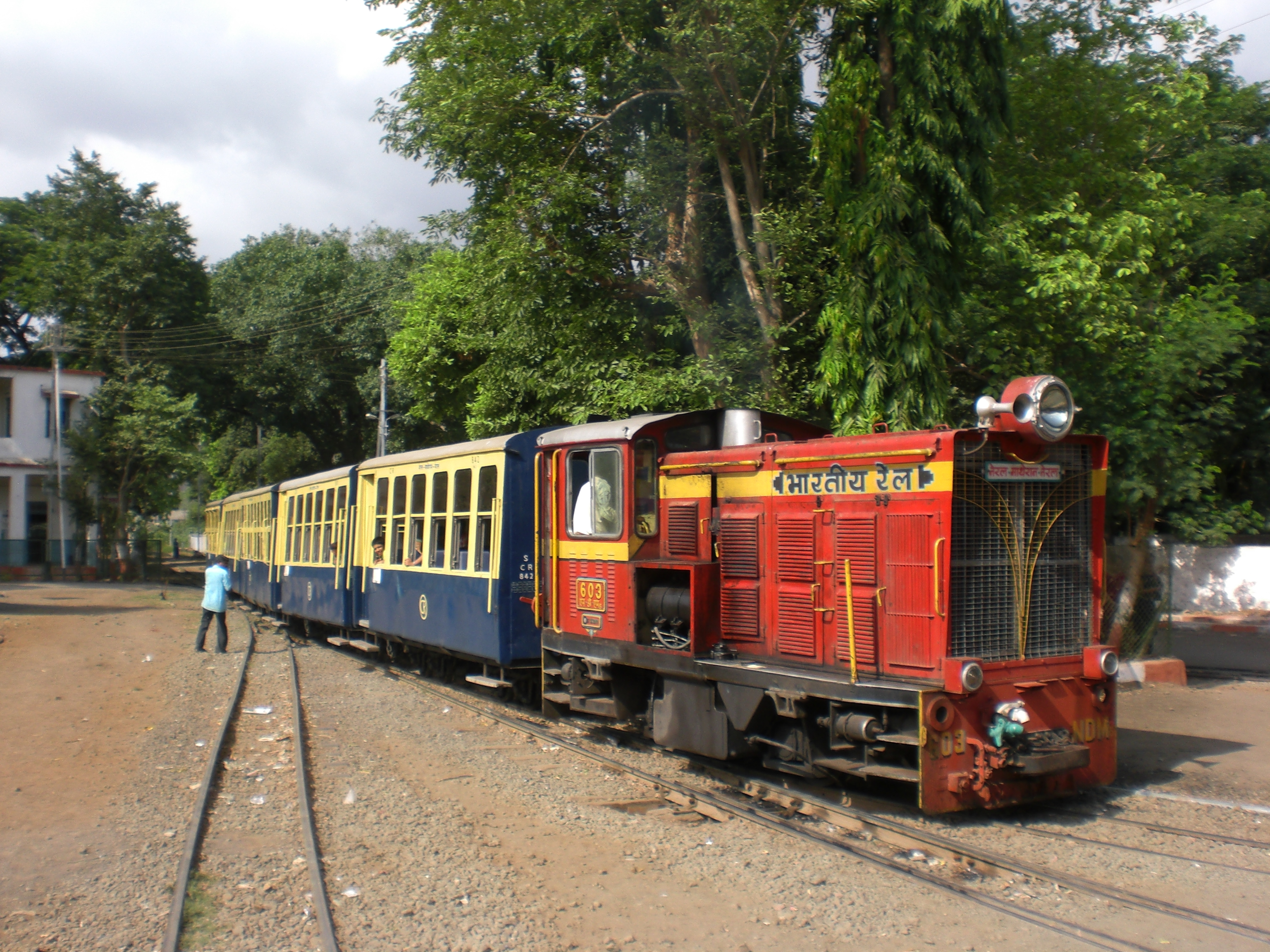
NDM6 diesel locomotive No.603 at Neral

Because of the line's sharp curves, only short-wheelbase four-wheel diesel units can be used; Class NDM1 and NDM6 locomotives are in use. Class NDM1 has two powered units, articulated with a central cab and initially developed by German builder Arnold Jung Lokomotivfabrik. The non-articulated Class NDM6 was manufactured by the Bangalore builders SAN.

ISR No.	Class	Builder	Builder No.	Date	Status	Notes
400	NDM-1	Indian Railways, Parel Works, Mumbai		2016	Delivered from Parel January 2016	In Neral shed awaiting commissioning, 1 April 2016
500	NDM-1	Jung	12108	1956	Withdrawn	Originally No. 700 from Kalka-Shimla Railway
501	NDM-1	Jung	12109	1956; rebuilt at Parel 2002	In service	Originally No. 750
502	NDM-1	Jung	12110	1956	Dismantled for repairs at Neral 1 April 2016	Originally No. 751
503	NDM-1	Jung	12111	1956	Withdrawn	Originally No. 752
504	NDM-1	Jung	12105	1956	Withdrawn	Originally No. 701 from Kalka-Shimla Railway
505	NDM-1	Jung	12107	1956	Withdrawn	Originally No. 703 from Kalka-Shimla Railway
506	NDM-1	Jung	12106	1956	Withdrawn	Originally No. 702 from Kalka-Shimla Railway
550	NDM-1A	Indian Railways, Parel Works, Mumbai		2006	In service	On Aman Lodge shuttle 7/3/15
551	NDM-1A	Indian Railways, Parel Works, Mumbai		2006	In service	On Aman Lodge shuttle 7/3/15
600	NDM6	SAN	559	1997	In service	Repairs at Neral 1 April 2016
603	NDM6	SAN	568	1998	In service	Recorded on 7 March 2015 on Aman Lodge shuttle

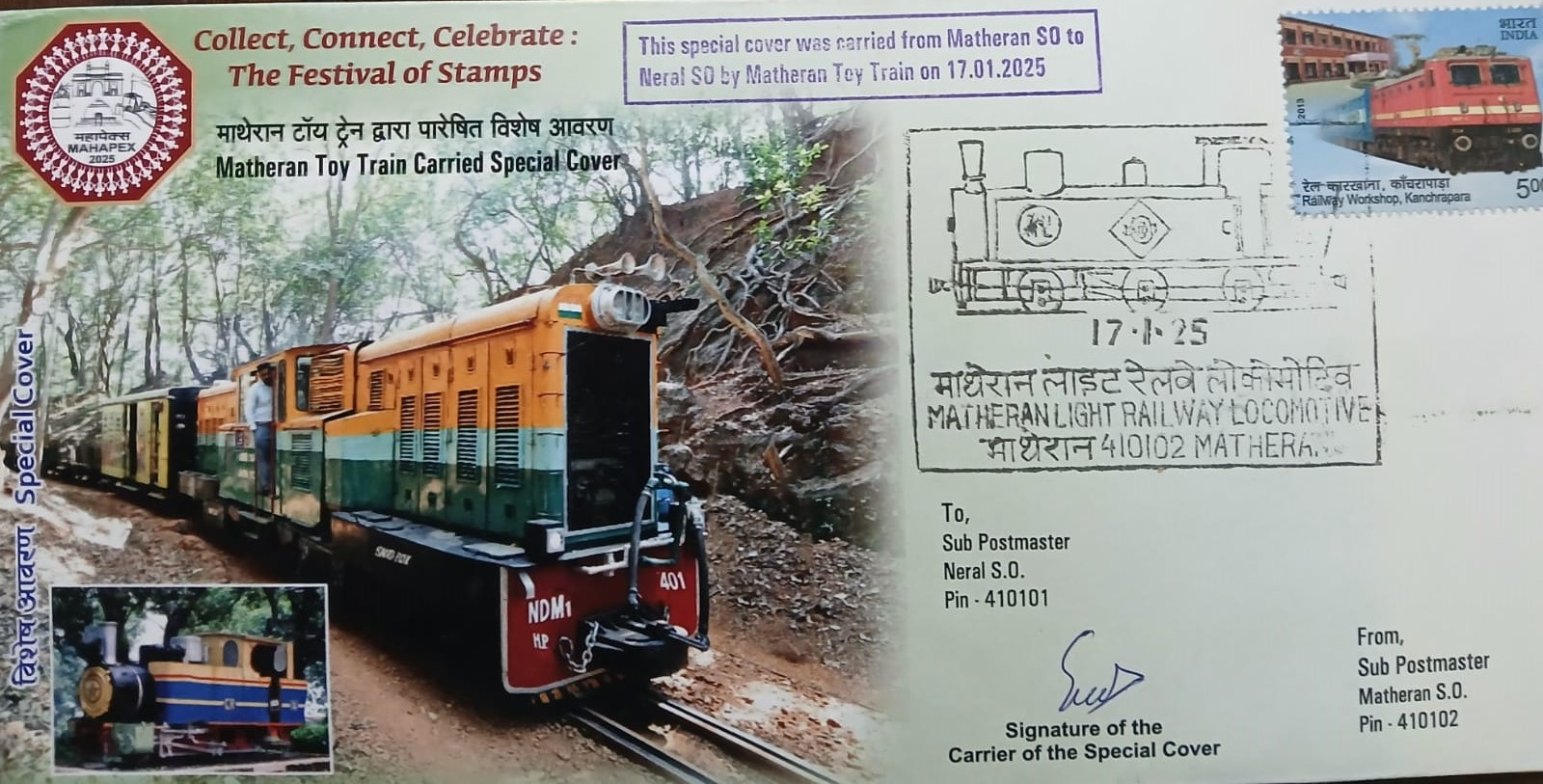
Special cover carried by the Matheran toy train from Matheran SO to Neral SO

== Route ==
Neral, the starting point, is near Mumbai. The 2 ft (610 mm) narrow-gauge line runs parallel to the broad-gauge line west of Hardal Hill before turning east to ascend towards Matheran. The rail and road meet near Jumapatti, and meet again after a brief separation at Bhekra Khud. After a short level stretch, there is a sharp ascent just before Mount Barry. A large horseshoe embankment was built to avoid a reversing station here. The line runs for a mile or so northwards around this before turning to take the One-Kiss Tunnel through the embankment. Two more zig-zags through deep cuttings remain before Panorama Point is reached, and then the line bends back to Simpson's Tank and ends at Matheran. It takes about two hours and 20 minutes to complete the 21-kilometre (13 mi) journey, although CR plans to reduce this to one hour 30 minutes.

=== Stations ===
- Neral: The junction to switch lines.
- Jumapatti
- Water Pipe: Used for filling Steam Locomotives
- Aman Lodge: Named after a nearby Lodge
- Matheran: The Hill Terminus
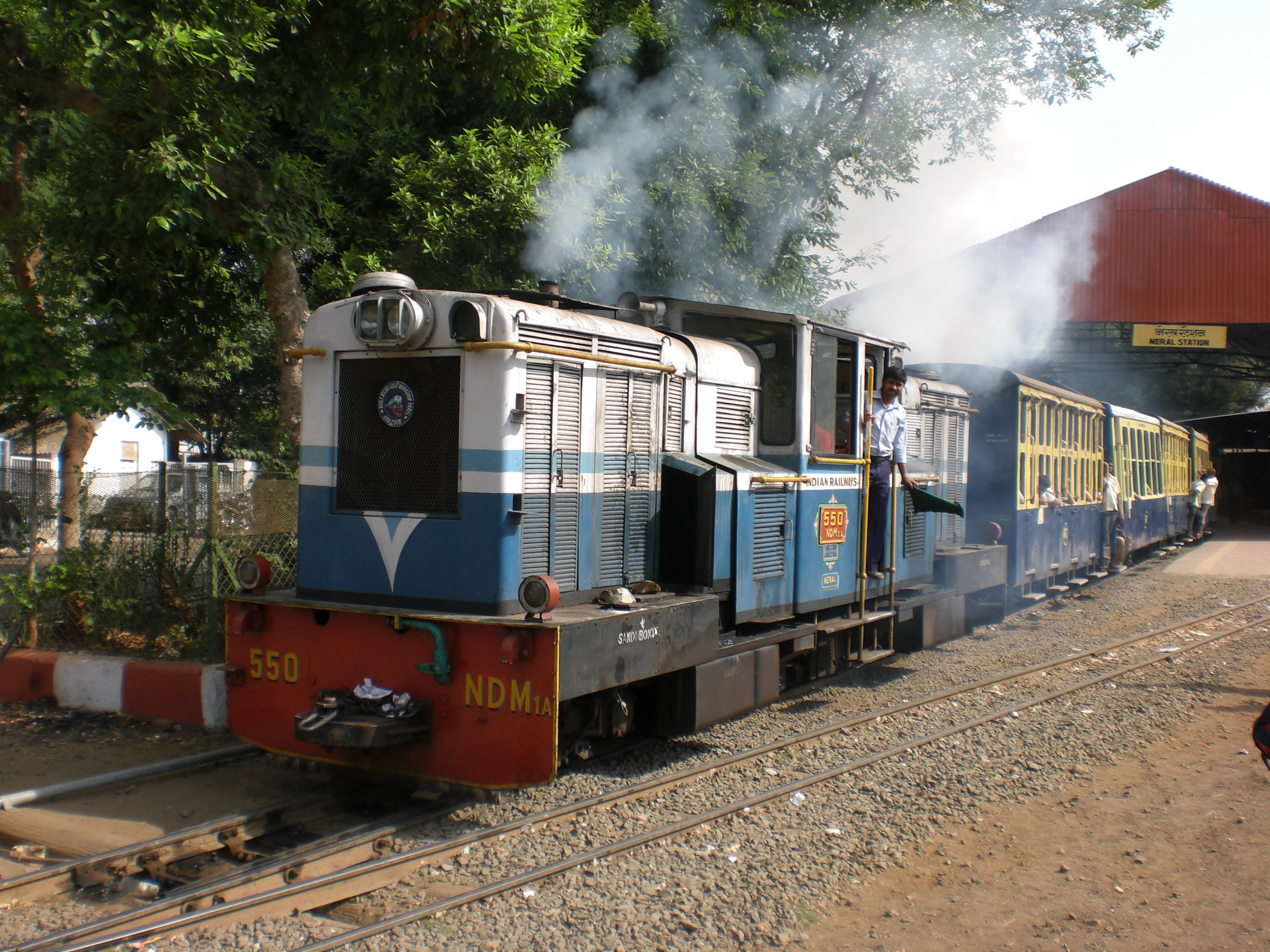
Neral station

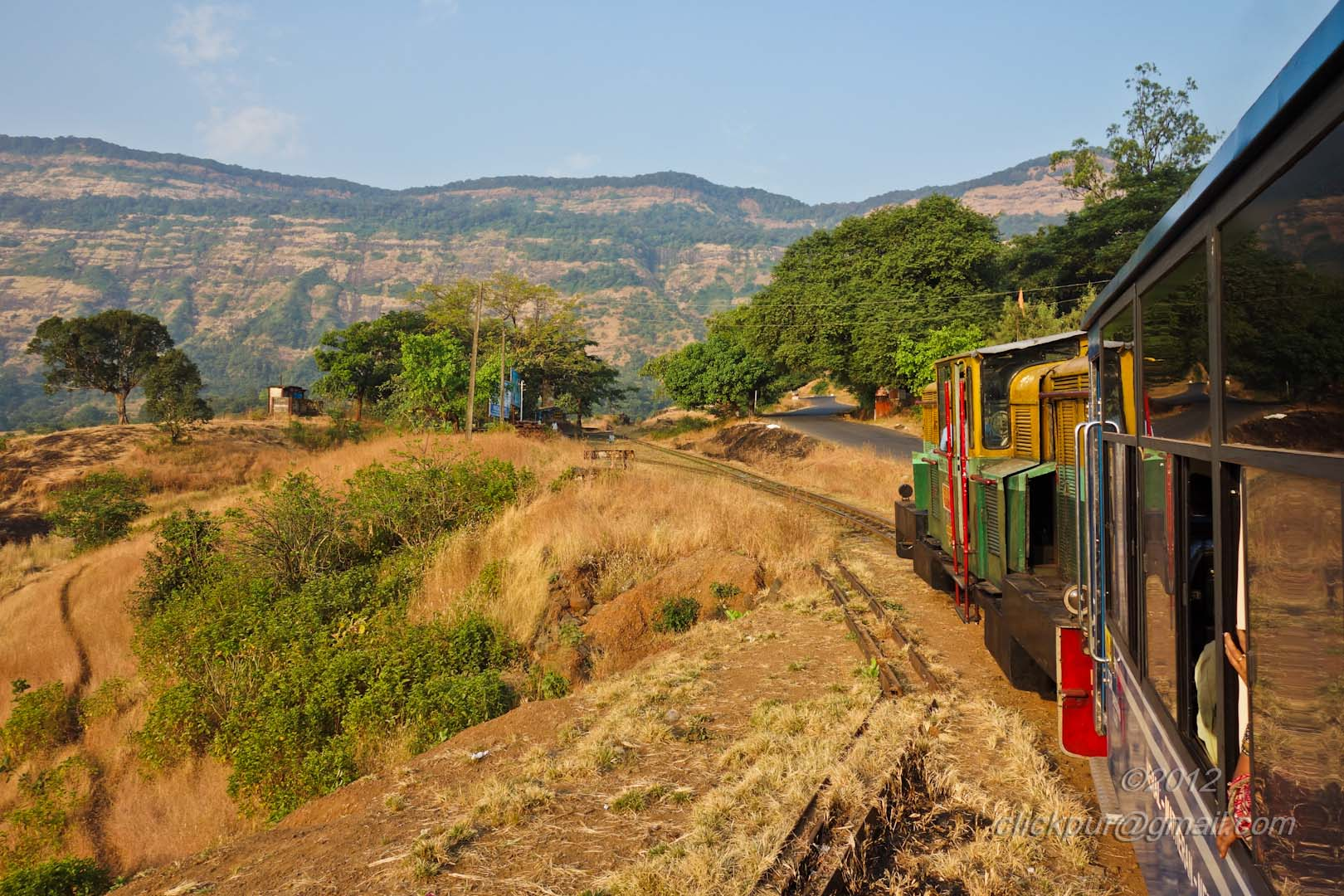
Jumapatti station

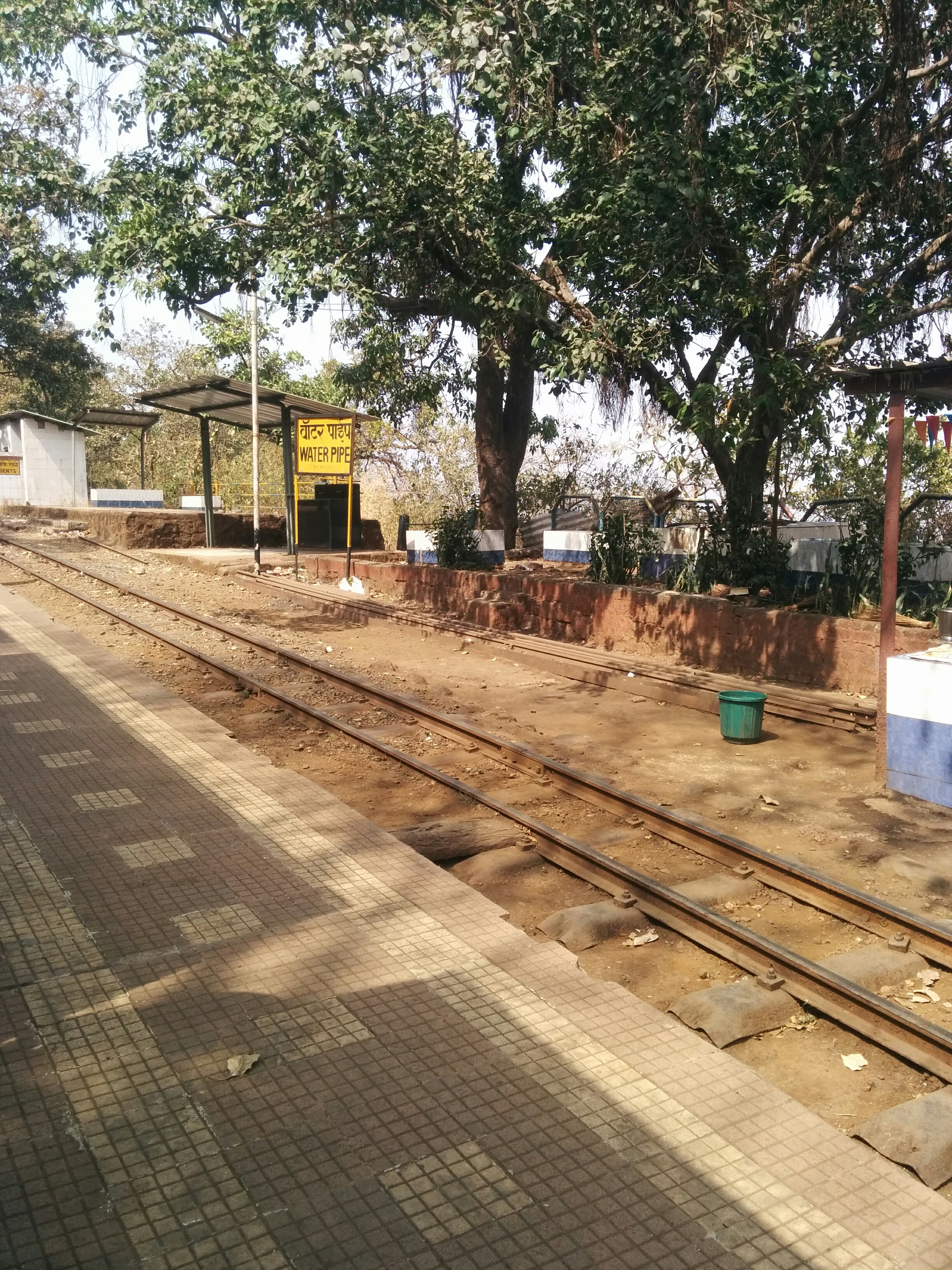
Water Pipe station

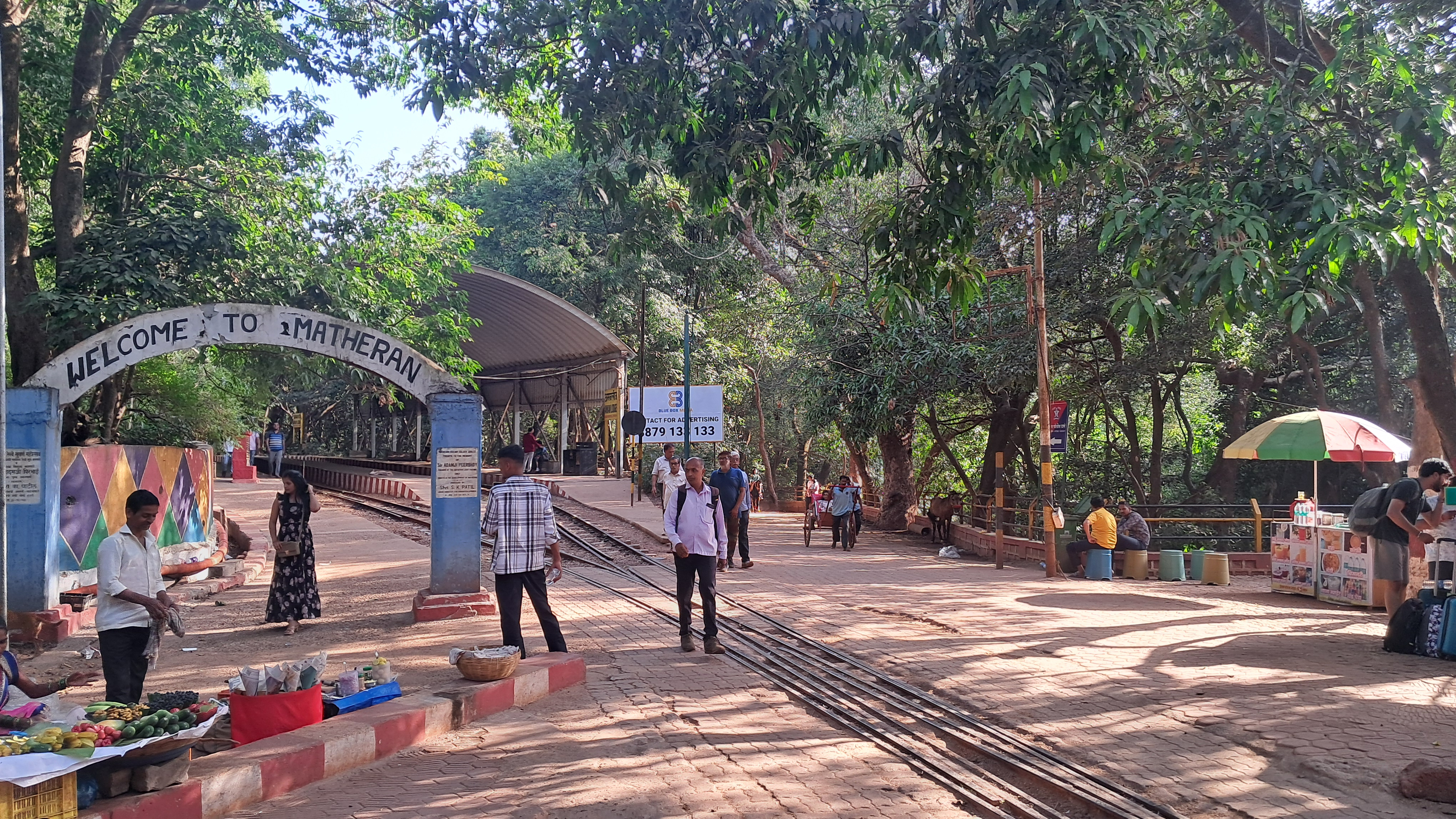
Aman Lodge Station

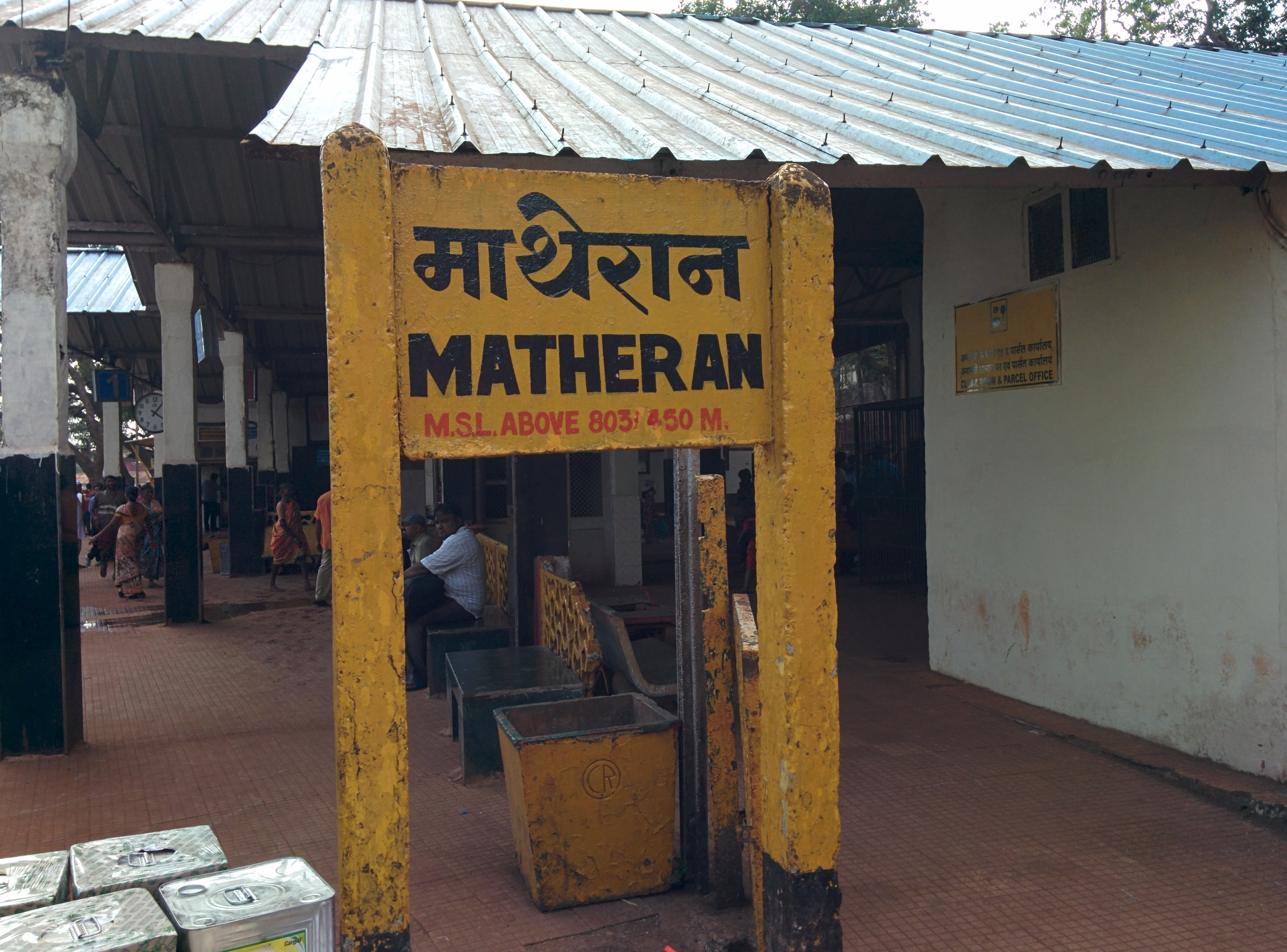
Matheran station

== Timetable ==
Up services
Train No.	Departure	Origin	Arrival	Destination
52153	8:45	Aman Lodge	9:03	Matheran
52103	8:50	Neral	11:30	Matheran
52155	9:35	Aman Lodge	9:53	Matheran
52105	10:25	Neral	13:05	Matheran
Special 1†	10:30	Aman Lodge	10:48	Matheran
52157	12:00	Aman Lodge	12:18	Matheran
Special 3†	13:35	Aman Lodge	13:53	Matheran
52159	14:25	Aman Lodge	14:43	Matheran
52161	15:40	Aman Lodge	15:58	Matheran
52163	17:45	Aman Lodge	18:03	Matheran
† - Available only on Sat-Sun

Down services
Train No.	Departure	Origin	Arrival	Destination
52154	8:20	Matheran	8:38	Aman Lodge
52156	9:10	Matheran	9:28	Aman Lodge
Special 2†	10:05	Matheran	10:23	Aman Lodge
52158	11:35	Matheran	11:53	Aman Lodge
Special 4†	13:10	Matheran	13:28	Aman Lodge
52160	14:00	Matheran	14:18	Aman Lodge
52104	14:45	Matheran	17:30	Neral
52162	15:15	Matheran	15:33	Aman Lodge
52106	16:00	Matheran	18:40	Neral
52164	17:20	Matheran	17:38	Aman Lodge
† - Available only on Sat-Sun

== See also ==
- Mountain railways of India
