= Water Pipe railway station =

Railway station in Raigad district, India

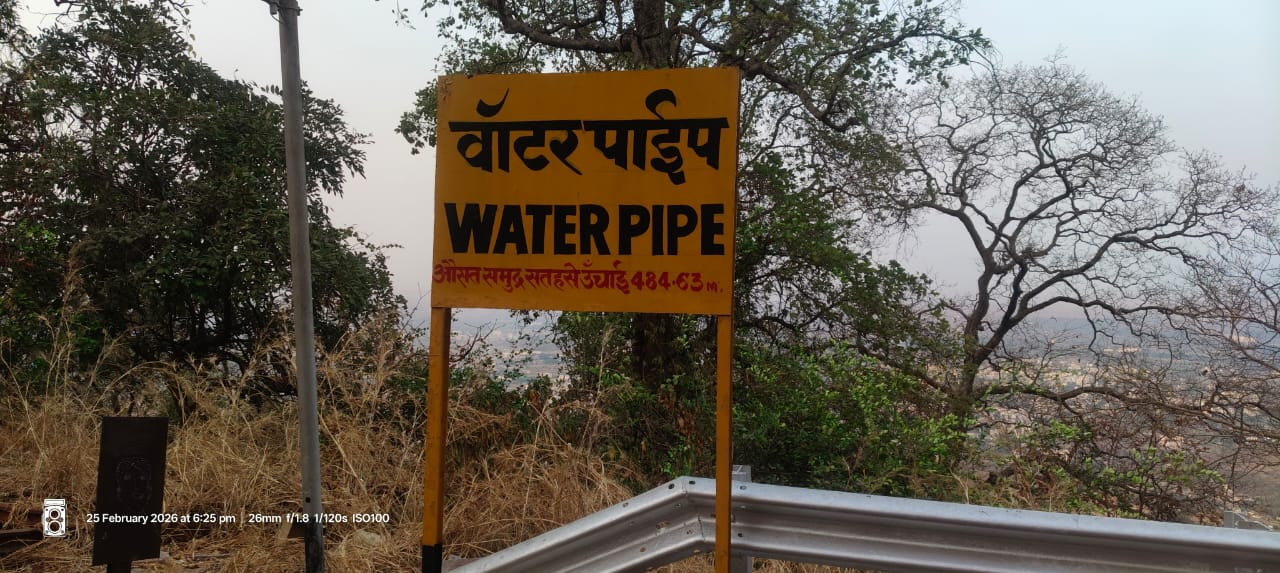
Water Pipe railway station.

Water Pipe railway station is a railway station on the Neral – Matheran railway line of the Matheran Hill Railway. It is named so for its proximity to water pipes.
