= Aman Lodge railway station =

Railway station in Raigad district, India

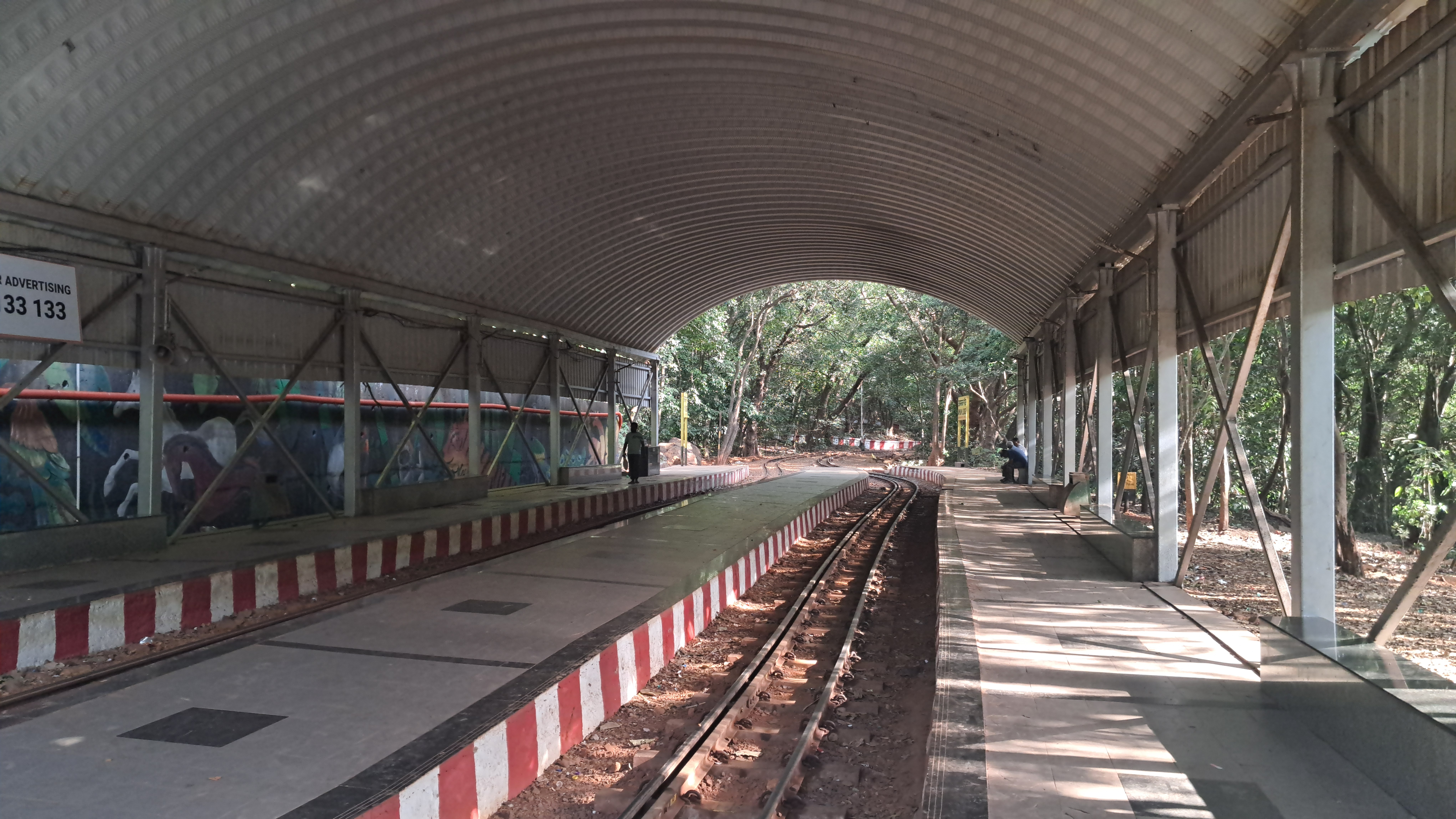
- Aman Lodge Station Platform

General information
- Location: India
- Coordinates: 18.9977°N 73.2760°E
- Line: Matheran Hill Railway
Location

Aman Lodge railway station is a railway station on the Neral–Matheran railway line of the Matheran Hill Railway. The Aman Lodge – Matheran service continues during monsoon too. As no automobiles are allowed in Matheran, the operation of this shuttle offers an alternative to walking or riding horses from the automobile parking area. The distance between Aman Lodge and Matheran is 3 km.

== Gallery ==
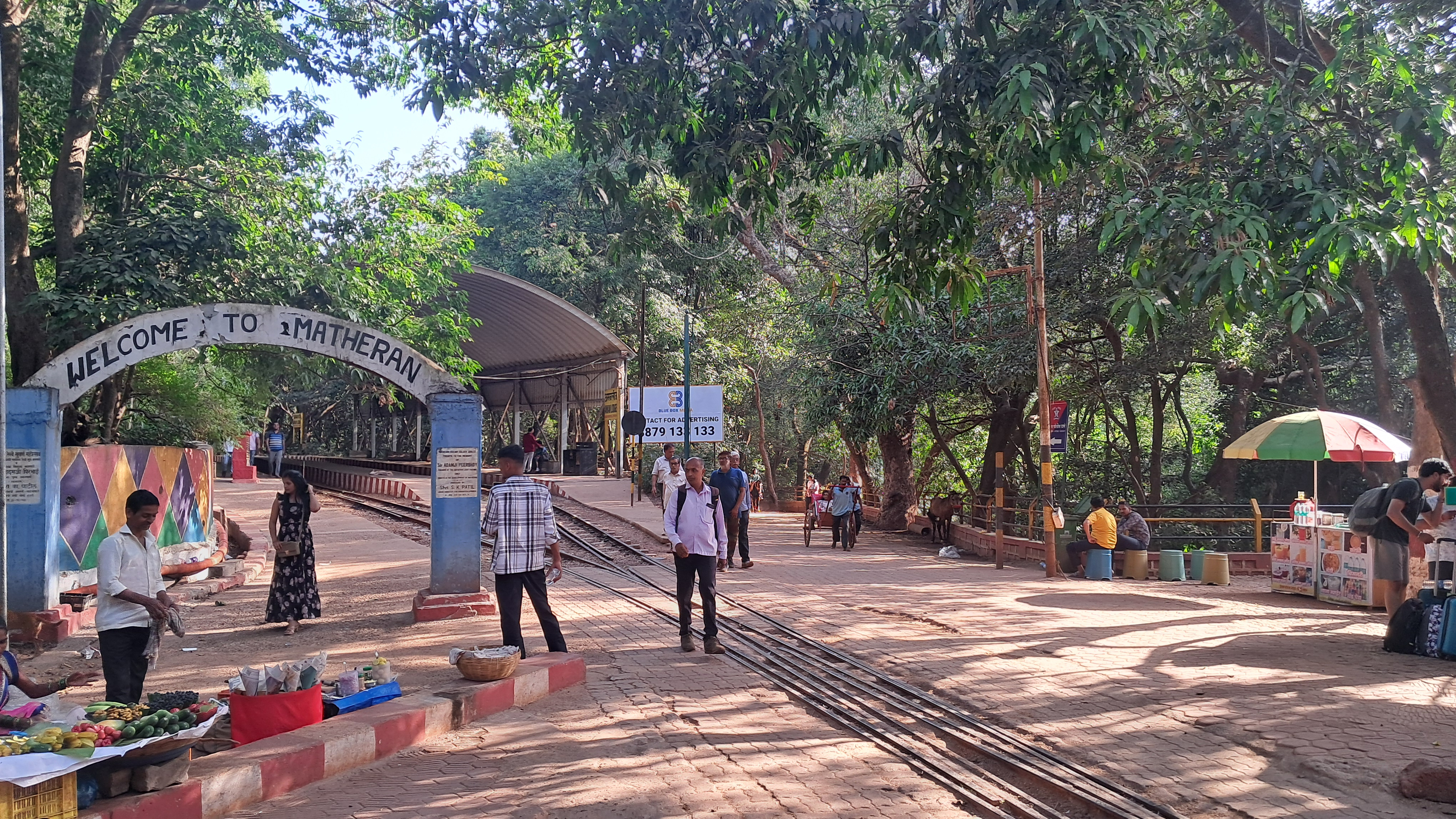
Road toward Aman Lodge Station

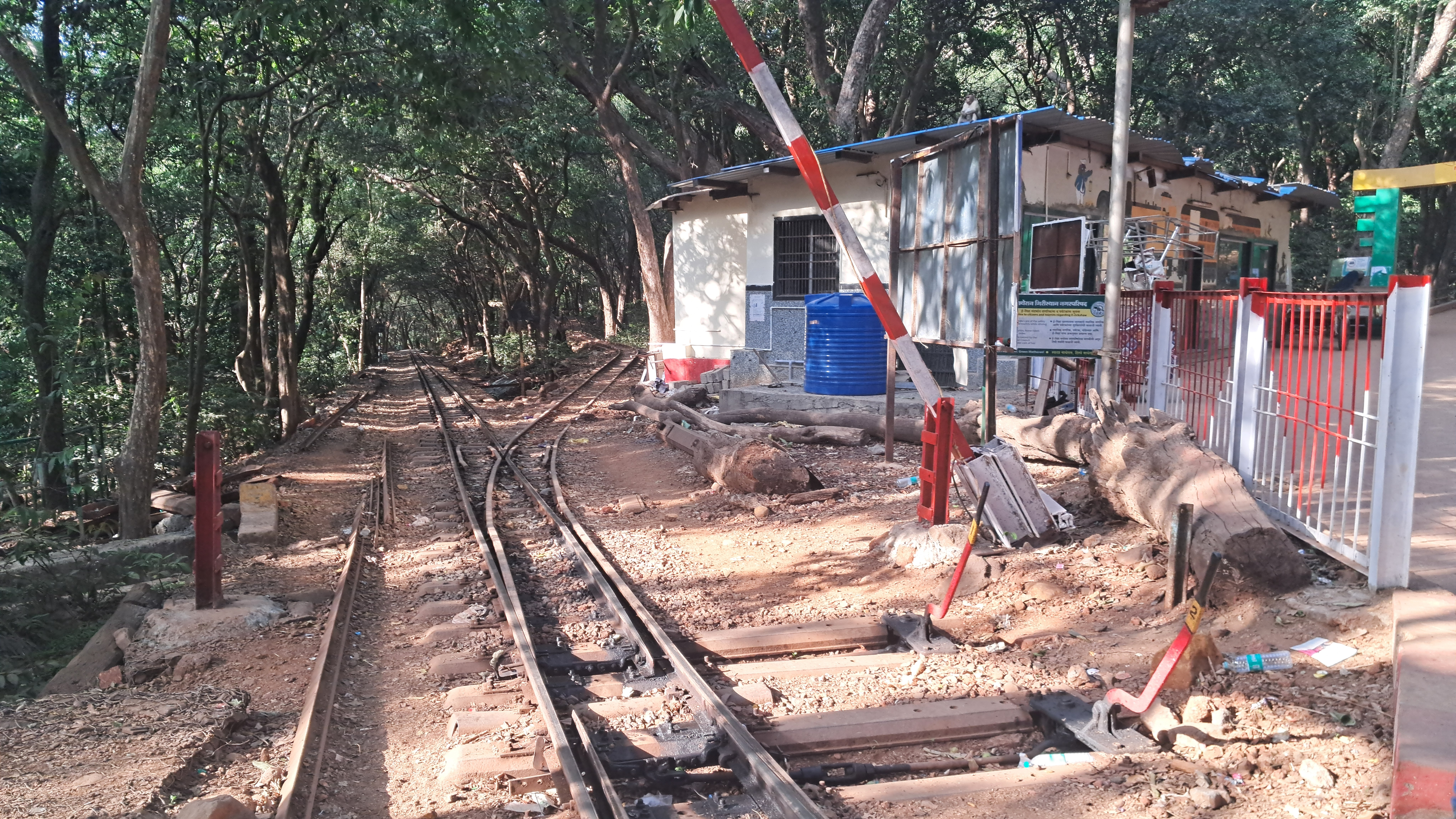
Tracks moving North of Aman Lodge Station

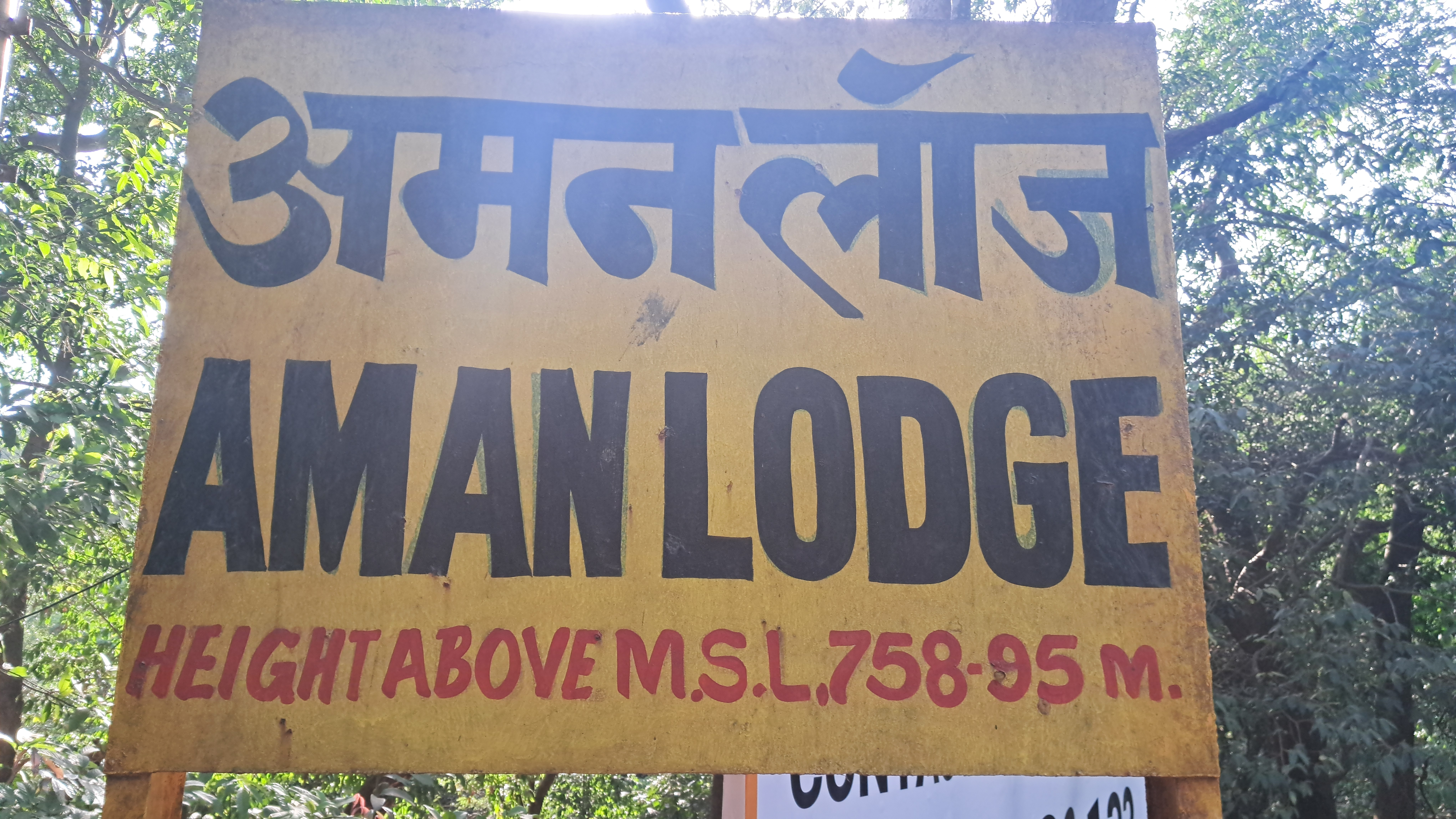
Aman Lodge Station Platform Board

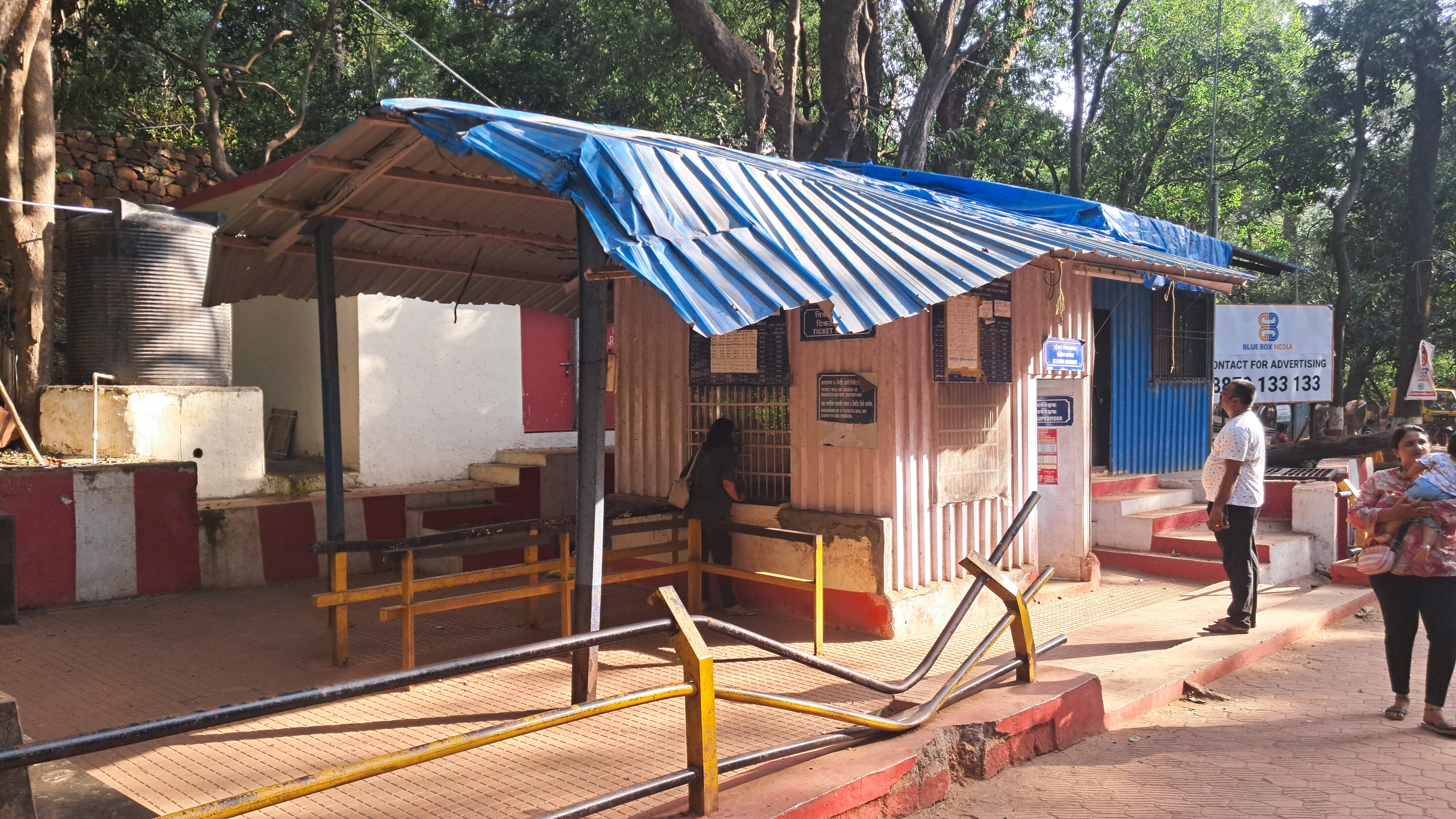
Aman Lodge Ticket Booking Office near the station
