= Neral, India =

Neral
- town
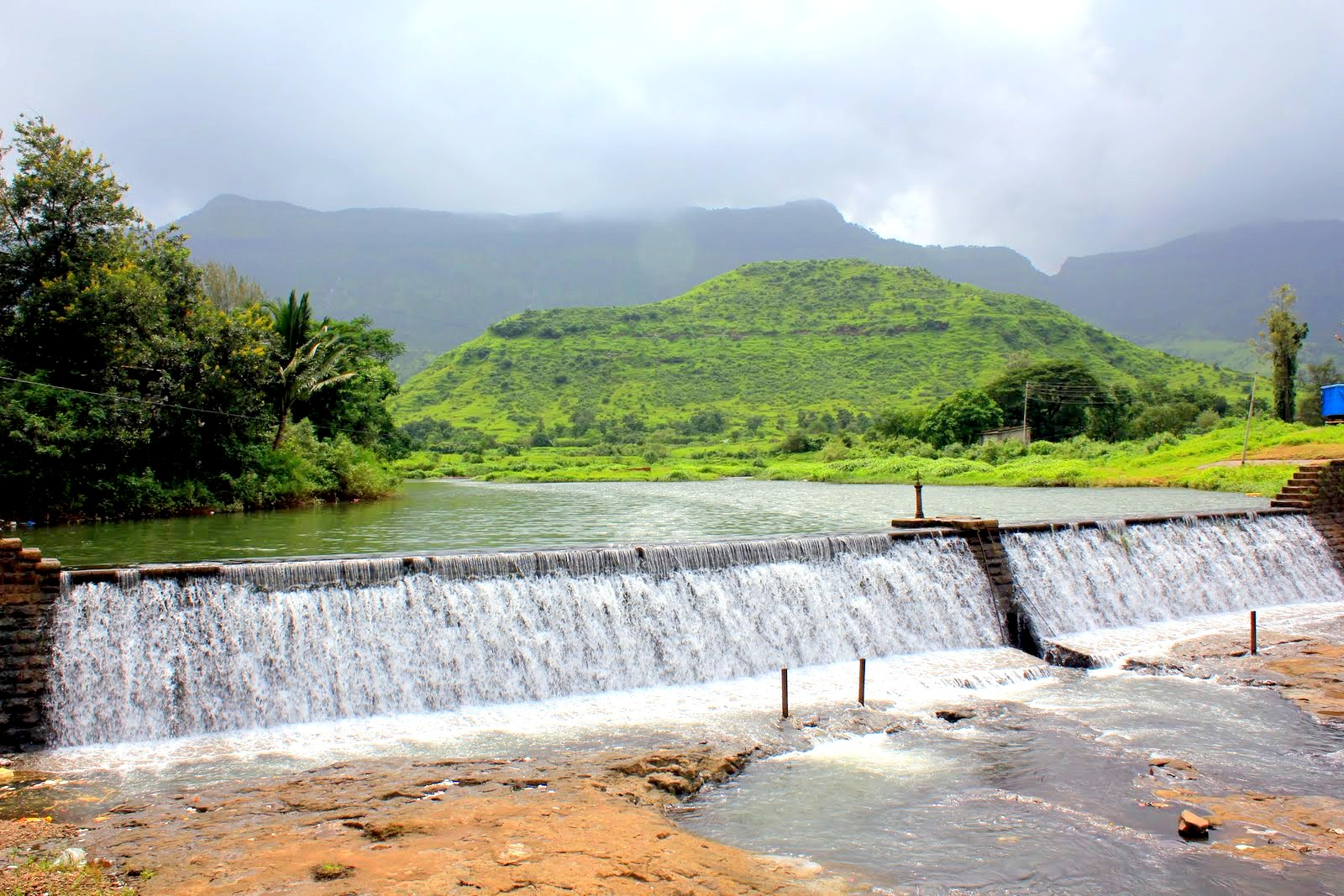
- Neral - Payarmal

- Location within Maharashtra
- Coordinates: 19°01′28.57″N 73°18′56.58″E
- Country: India
- State: Maharashtra
- District: Raigad
- Taluka: Karjat

Government
  - Type: Gram Panchayat
  - Body: Neral Gram Panchayat
  - Sarpanch: Usha Pardhi
  - Up-Sarpanch: Mangesh Mhaskar
  - Village Department Officer: -
  - Talathi Saja: -

Population (2026)
  - Total: 40,665
  - Density: 375/km^{2} (970/sq mi)

Languages
  - Official: Marathi
- Time zone: UTC+5:30 (IST)
- Postal code: 410101
- Vehicle registration: MH - 46

Neral is a town in Raigad district in the Indian state of Maharashtra. It is 83 km+ developing city of Raigad district which is well connected to Panvel, Mumbai, Thane and Pune. Local people from communities like Agri, Kumbhar, Brahmin, Muslim, etc. settled here because this place was key route to Matheran and Vikatgad which were politically important for Maratha empire, Mughal empire and East India Company. Neral to Matheran Train Route was developed by East India Company for trading and colonial purposes. Hutatma Veer Bhai Kotwal was a great hero who rebelled against British Police in Neral - Matheran. Villages followed the same in following years to safeguard themselves from regular floods affecting their homes, farms and animals.

== Geography ==
Neral is located at 19.03°N 73.32°E. It has an average elevation of 40 metres (131 feet). Neral is a place which is the center between Mumbai and Pune, Neral has State Highway which is connecting to Karjat, NH4, Panvel and Murbad, people who visits Neral from Mumbai-South takes via Panvel route which is better, faster and easy to drive. Neral is at key location in the proposed Uran-Panvel-Neral-Bhimashankar SH-54 State Highway.

It is popularly known as a railroad junction, with trains arriving from Mumbai and from Pune to the nearby and very popular hill station of Matheran. A narrow-gauge rail line, 21 km long, ("toy train") runs from Neral to Matheran. Nearest major towns are Badlapur and Karjat.

=== 2005 rainfall ===
The heavy rains on 26 July 2005 ruined the rail tracks and it had stopped operating, but the train has successfully started operating from 5 March 2007. The other option available to reach Matheran is to take a taxi to a certain point (called Dasturi naka) just before Matheran city boundary, beyond which one may proceed only on foot or on horseback.

== Matheran Toy Train ==
The famous Matheran - Neral Toy Train departs from Neral Station. This train goes from Neral to Matheran.

== Photo gallery ==
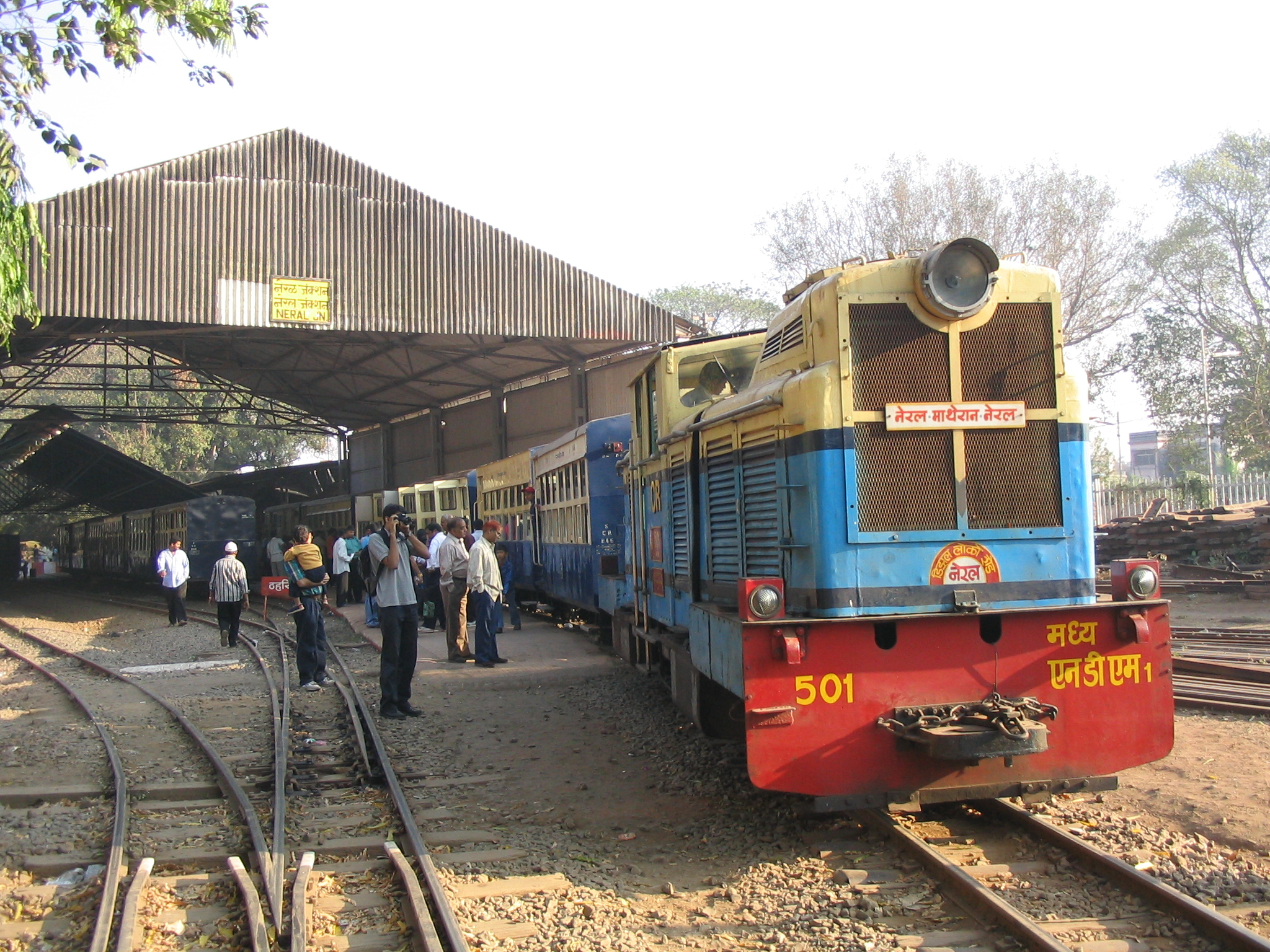
Neral Matheran Toy Train

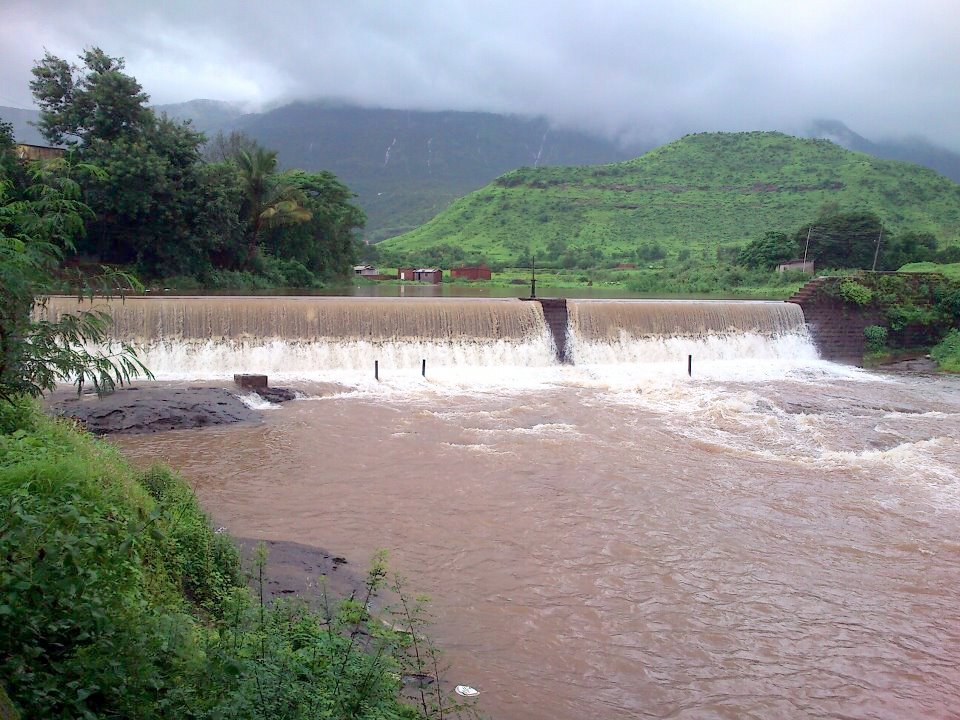
Neral Ganesh Ghat and Matheran Hills

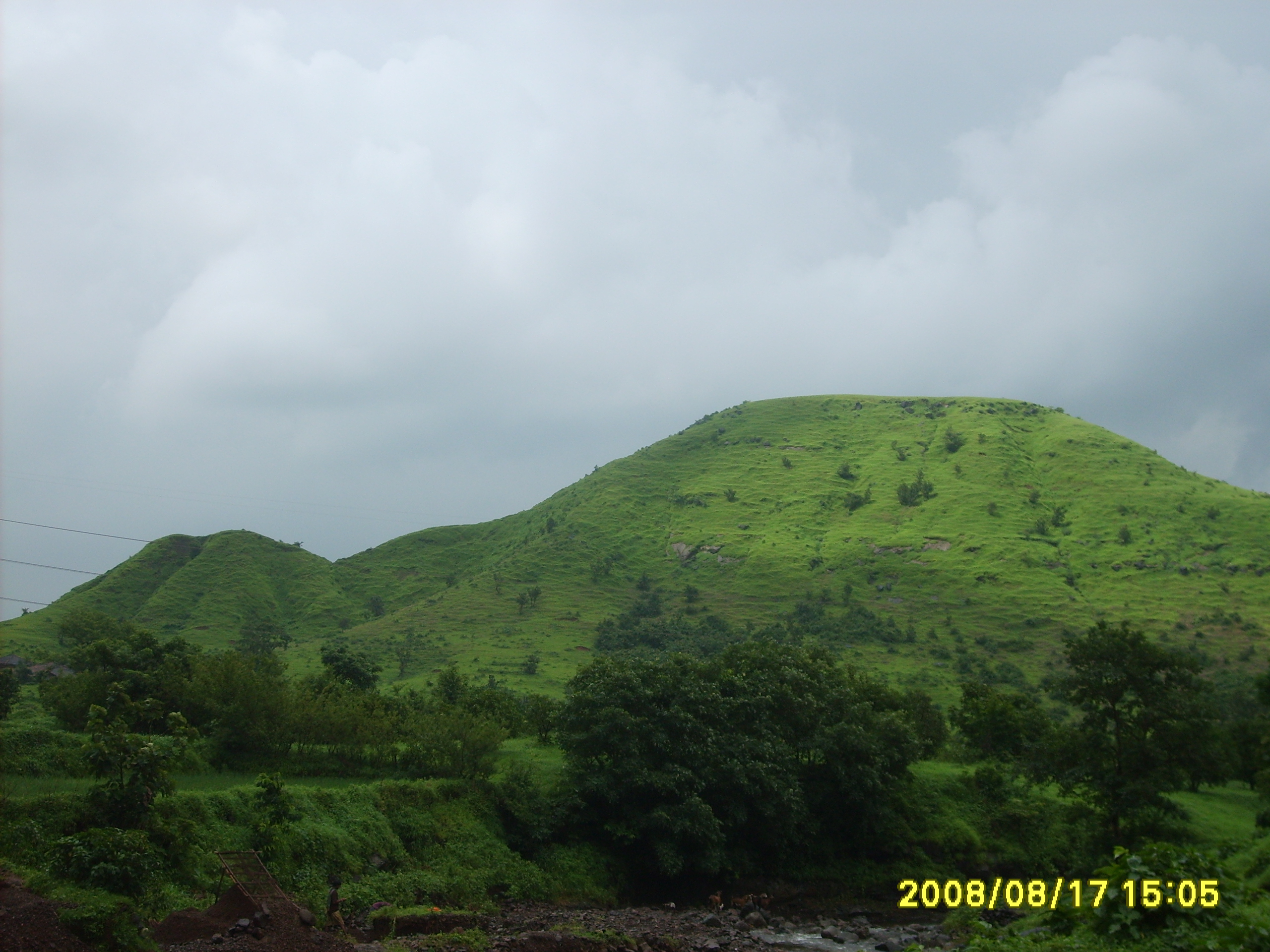
Neral Motor Hill

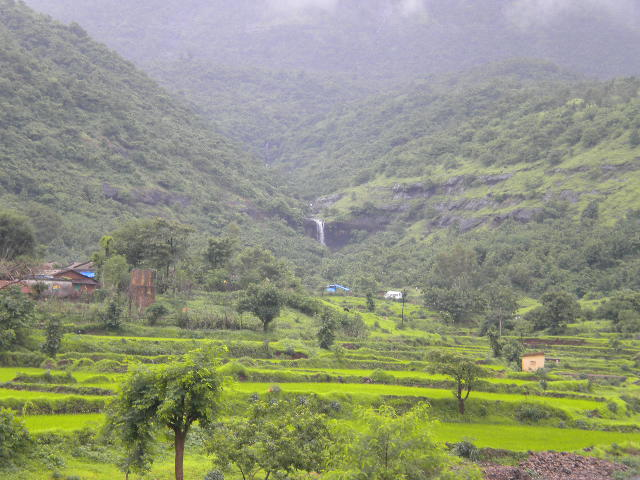
Neral Tapalwadi Waterfall

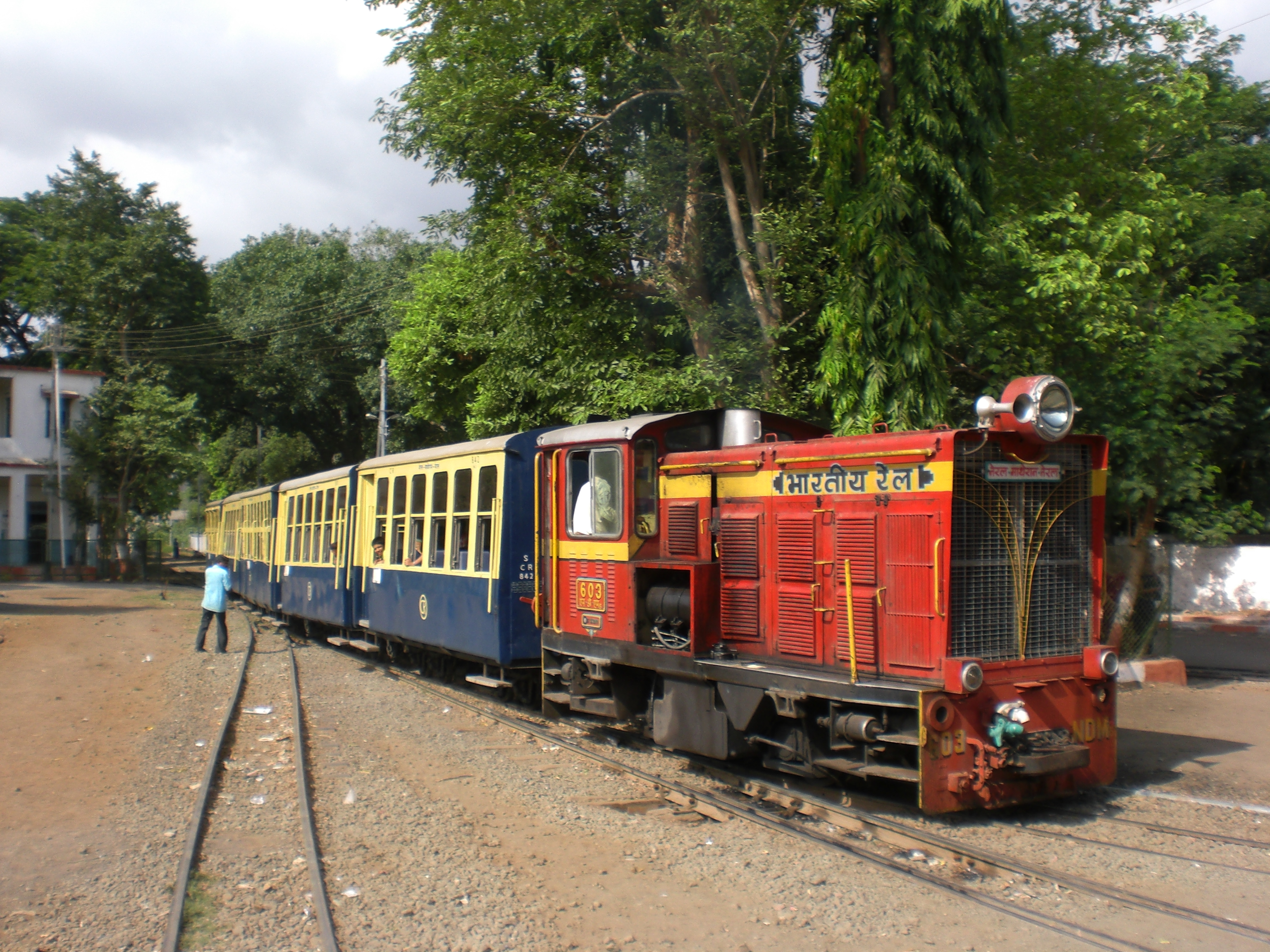
Toy Train at Neral Station

== See also ==
- Neral Junction railway station
- List of Mumbai Suburban Railway stations
- Matheran
