= List of villages in Murbad =

In Murbad, in the state of Maharashtra in India, there are about 206 villages. The population of Murbad is 18,725 people.

== A ==
- Agashi Murbad 850
- Alawe Murbad 351
- Alyani Murbad 309
- Ambe Tembhe Murbad 554
- Ambegaon Murbad 1,020
- Ambele Bk. Murbad 1,086
- Ambele Kh. Murbad 795
- Ambiwali Murbad 267
- Anandnagar Murbad 487
- Anandnagar Murbad 552
- Askot Murbad 356
- Asole Murbad 1,534
- Asose Murbad 681
- Awalegaon Murbad 743

== Bangar pada ==
- Balegaon Murbad 1,193
- Bandhivali Murbad 858
- Bhadane, Murbad 1,354
- Bhaluk Murbad 1,289
- Bhorande Murbad 64
- Bhuwan Murbad 1,188
- Borgaon Murbad 884
- Boriwali Murbad 418
- Brahmangaon Murbad 555
- Bursunge Murbad 533

== C ==
- Chafe Tarf Khedul Murbad 303
- Chandrapur Murbad 596
- Chasole Murbad 907
- Chikhale Murbad 454
- Chirad Murbad 408

== Dohlyacha pada ==
- Dahigaon Murbad 776
- Dahigaon Murbad 496
- Dahivali Murbad 585
- Dangurle Murbad 640
- Dehanoli Murbad 865
- Dehari Murbad 610
- Deogaon Murbad 2,645
- Deoghar Murbad 105
- Deope Murbad 720
- Dhanivali Murbad 1,440
- Dhargaon Murbad 999
- Dhasai Murbad 3,053
- Dighephal Murbad 105
- Diwanpada Murbad 298
- Dongar Nhave Murbad 1,827
- Dudhanoli Murbad 710
- Durgapur Murbad 875

== E ==
- Eklahare Murbad 521

== F ==
- Fangaloshi Murbad 806
- Fangane Murbad 496
- Fangulgavhan Murbad 1,201
- Fansoli Murbad 1,301

== G ==
- Ganeshpur Murbad 885
- Ganeshpur Murbad 459
- Gawali Murbad 943
- Ghagurli Murbad 342
- Ghorale Murbad 796
- Gorakhgad Murbad 1
- Goregaon Murbad 495

== H ==
- Hedavali Murbad 281
- Hireghar Murbad 225

== I ==
- Inde Murbad 885

== J ==
- Jadai Murbad 491
- Jaigaon Murbad 496
- Jambhurde Murbad 1,330
- Jamghar Murbad 533

== K ==
- Kachakoli Murbad 869
- Kalambad Mu Murbad 408
- Kalambhe Murbad 1,299
- Kalamkhande Murbad 987
- Kalanbhad Murbad 1,017
- Kandali Murbad 295
- Kanharle Murbad 798
- Kanhol Murbad 822
- Karavale Murbad 1,118
- Karchonde Murbad 731
- Kasgaon Murbad 524
- Kedurli Murbad 919
- Khandape Murbad 1,066
- Khandare Murbad 606
- Khanivare Murbad 825
- Khapari Murbad 1,318
- Kharshet Umbroli Murbad 953
- Khateghar Murbad 963
- Khed Murbad 493
- Khedale Murbad 623
- Kheware Murbad 814
- Khopivali Murbad 1,333
- Khutal Bangla Murbad 510
- Khutal Baragaon Murbad 1,747
- Khutarwadigaon Murbad 442
- Kisal Murbad 1,150
- Kishor Murbad 1,067
- Kochare Bk. Murbad 415
- Kochare Kh. Murbad 182
- Kole Murbad 267
- Koloshi Murbad 821
- Kolthan Murbad 1,065
- Kondesakhare Murbad 623
- Korawale Murbad 1,793
- Kudavali Murbad 2,189
- Kudshet Murbad 559

== M ==
- Madh Murbad 798
- Mahaj Murbad 596
- Majgaon Murbad 899
- Mal Murbad 3,123
- Malegaon Murbad 1,044
- Malhed Murbad 1,181
- Malinagar Murbad 905
- Mandus Murbad 355
- Mandwat Murbad 177
- Mangaon Murbad 395
- Mangaon Murbad 324
- Manivali Bk. Murbad 1,407
- Manivali Kh. Murbad 979
- Manivali Shirvali Murbad 1,480
- Manivali Tarf Khedul Murbad 419
- Masale Murbad 2,033
- Merdi Murbad 988
- Mharas Murbad 799
- Mhase Murbad 1,242
- Milhe Murbad 985
- Mohaghar Murbad 1,109
- Mohap Murbad 392
- Moharai Murbad 633
- Mohghar Murbad 227
- Moroshi Murbad 142

== N ==
- Nadhai Murbad 1,116
- Nagaon Murbad 1,435
- Nandeni Murbad 427
- Nandgaon Murbad 699
- Narayangaon Murbad 429
- Narivali Murbad 1,658
- Nevalpada Murbad 912
- Nhave Murbad 928
- Nyahadi Murbad 781

== O ==
- Ojiwale Murbad 380

== P ==
- Padale Murbad 644
- Palu Murbad 489
- Panshet Murbad 510
- Pargaon Murbad 526
- Parhe Murbad 705
- Paronde Murbad 406
- Pasheni Murbad 232
- Patgaon Murbad 628
- Pawale Murbad 1,191
- Pendhari Murbad 281
- Pimpalgaon Murbad 854
- Pimpalghar Murbad 283
- Potgaon Murbad 1,013

== R ==
- Rampur Murbad 945
- Ranjangaon Murbad 338
- Rao Murbad 442

== S ==
- Sajai Murbad 1,489
- Sajgaon Murbad 194
- Sakhare Murbad 527
- Sakurli Murbad 710
- Sangam Murbad 691
- Saralgaon Murbad 2,057
- Sasane Murbad 1,146
- Sawarne Murbad 541
- Sayale Murbad 722
- Shai Murbad 744
- Shastrinagar Murbad 1,450
- Shedali Murbad 804
- Shelgaon Murbad 743
- Shidgaon Murbad 535
- Shiravali Murbad 1,891
- Shirgaon Murbad 1,243
- Shiroshi Murbad 1,130
- Shirpur Murbad 424
- Shivale Murbad 1,952
- Sidhgad Murbad 280
- Singapur Murbad 957
- Sonavale Murbad 1,164
- Songaon Murbad 790

== T ==
- Talegaon Murbad 1,395
- Talekhal Murbad 489
- Talvali Bargaon Murbad 1,229
- Talwali Tarf Ghorad Murbad 1,067
- Tembhare Bk. Murbad 850
- Temgaon Murbad 334
- Thakare Nagar Murbad 913
- Vaishakhare Murbad 210
- Thune Murbad 740
- Tokawade Murbad 1,106
- Tondali Murbad 842
- Tulai Murbad 1,102

== U ==
- Uchale Murbad 862
- Udaldon Murbad 56
- Umaroli Bk. Murbad 738
- Umbarpada Murbad 1,456
- Umbroli Kh. Murbad 898

== V ==
- Vadgaon Murbad 616
- Vaishakhare Murbad 1,587
- Vehare Murbad 474
- Veluk Murbad 1,360
- Vidhe Murbad 1,188
- Vidhyanagar Murbad 316

== W ==
- Wadu Murbad 107
- Wadvali Murbad 1,742
- Waghgaon Murbad 639
- Waghivali Murbad 1,204
- Walhivale Murbad 1,381
- Wanjale Murbad 863
- Wanote Murbad 154

== Z ==
- Zadghar Murbad 1,505
