= Gorakhgad =

Fort ruins in the Western Ghats in India

Gorakhgad Fort
- Part of Sahyadri Hill Range
- Thane district, Maharashtra
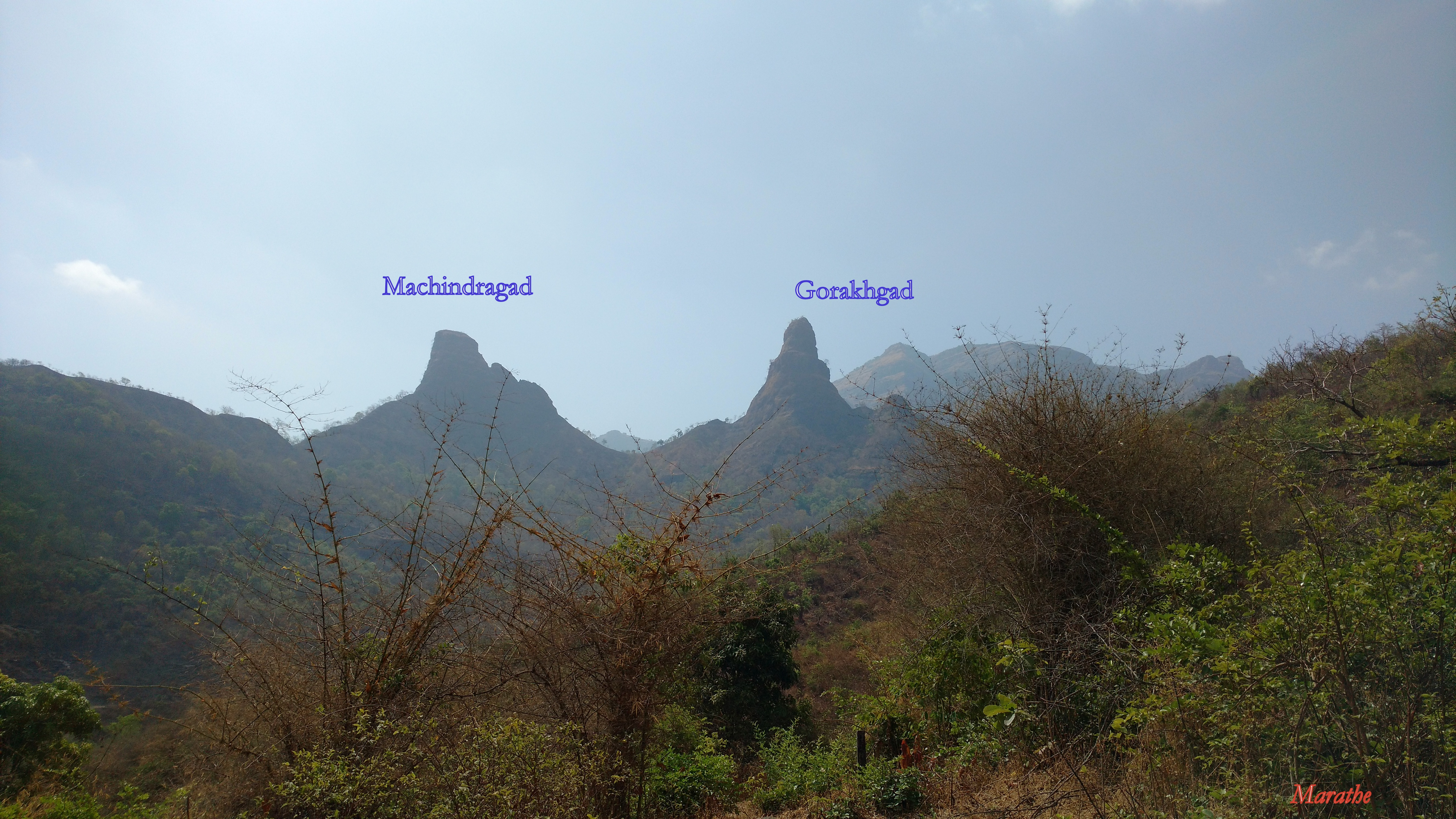
- Gorakhgad fort

Site information
- Type: Hill fort
- Owner: Government of India
- Open to the public: Yes
- Condition: Ruins

Location
- Shown within Maharashtra
- Location within Maharashtra
- Coordinates: 19°11′31.9″N 73°32′26.8″E
- Height: 649.22 M(2130 Ft)

Site history
- In use: Hermits for meditation
- Materials: Stone

Gorakhgad Fort is a fort located 24 km from Murbad, Thane district, of Maharashtra. This fort is an important fort in Thane district. This fort was mainly used by sadhus or hermits for meditation.and also by local people's of surrounding village, It was also used to guard the ancient trade route passing through Naneghat.

== Location ==
The nearest town is Dehri Talekhal village which is 24 km from murbad.

== Description ==
After main entrance gate there is an inscription in Marathi. There are rock cut water cisterns near the cave. The water is available round the year for drinking purpose. The cave is spacious and has square pillars. There is a small Mahadev temple on the top. The Ahupe Ghat and Siddhagad can be seen from the top.

== Gallery ==
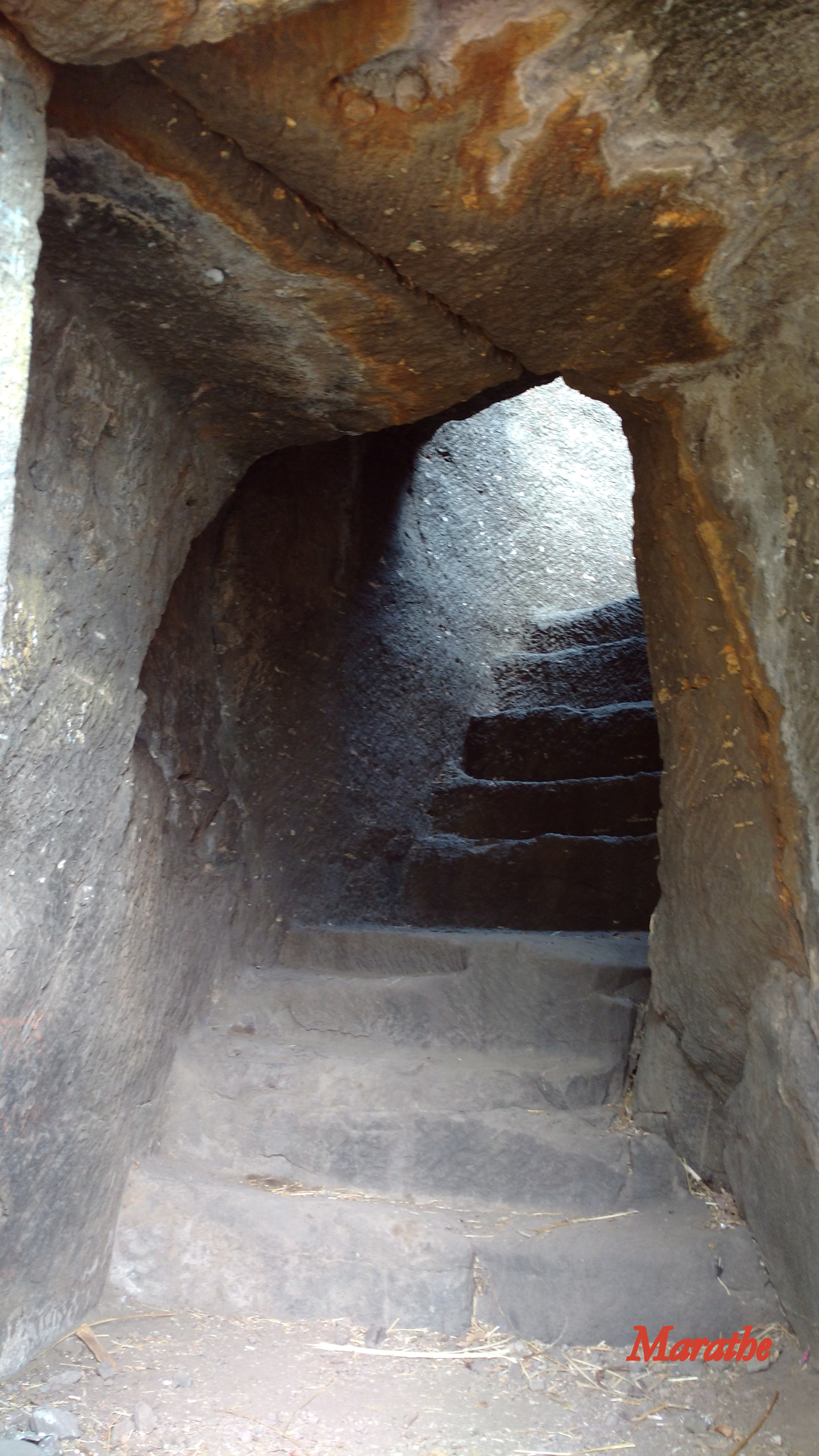
Main gate of Gorakhgad Fort

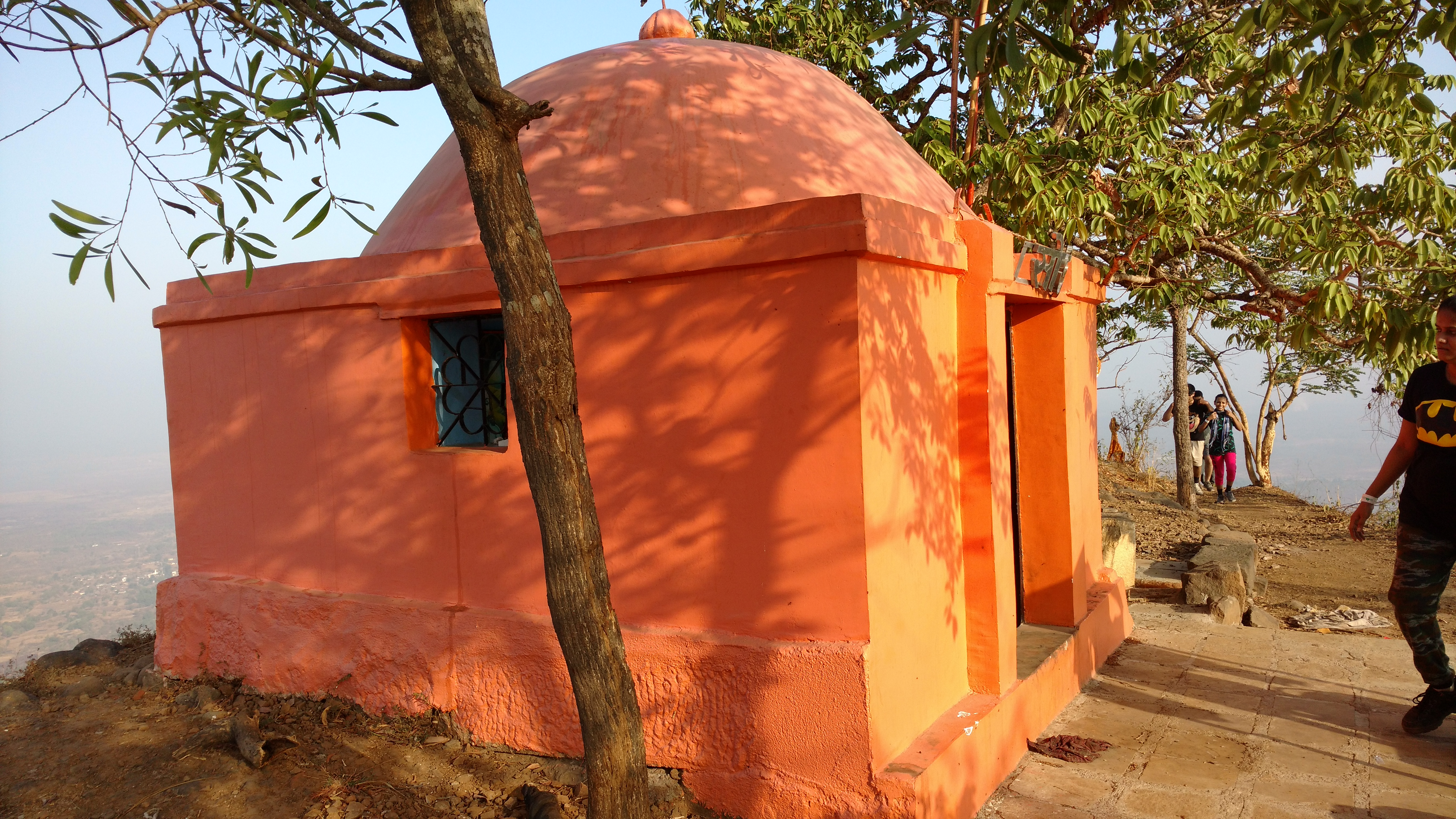
Gorakshnath temple on the top

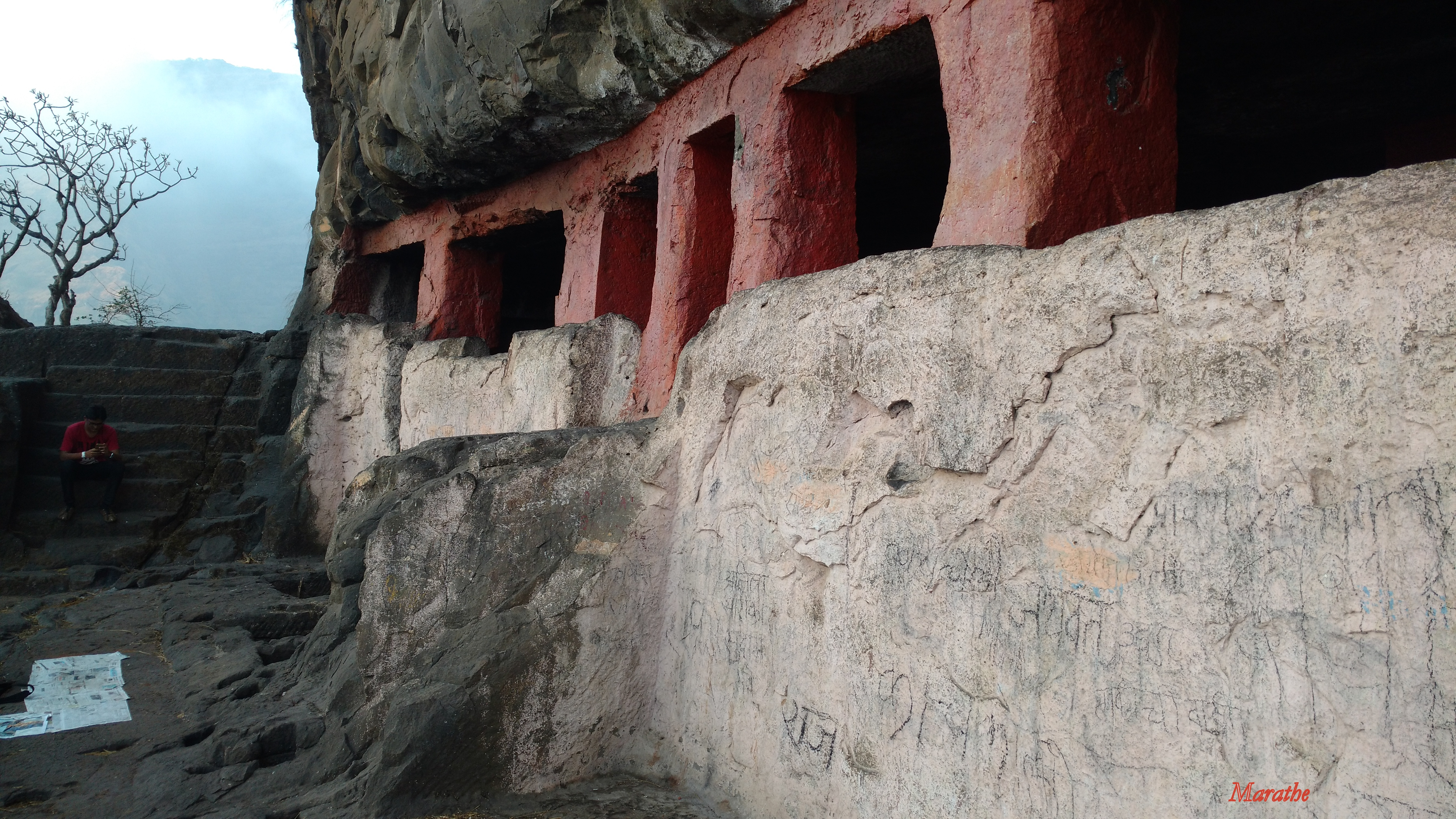
Cave on the fort

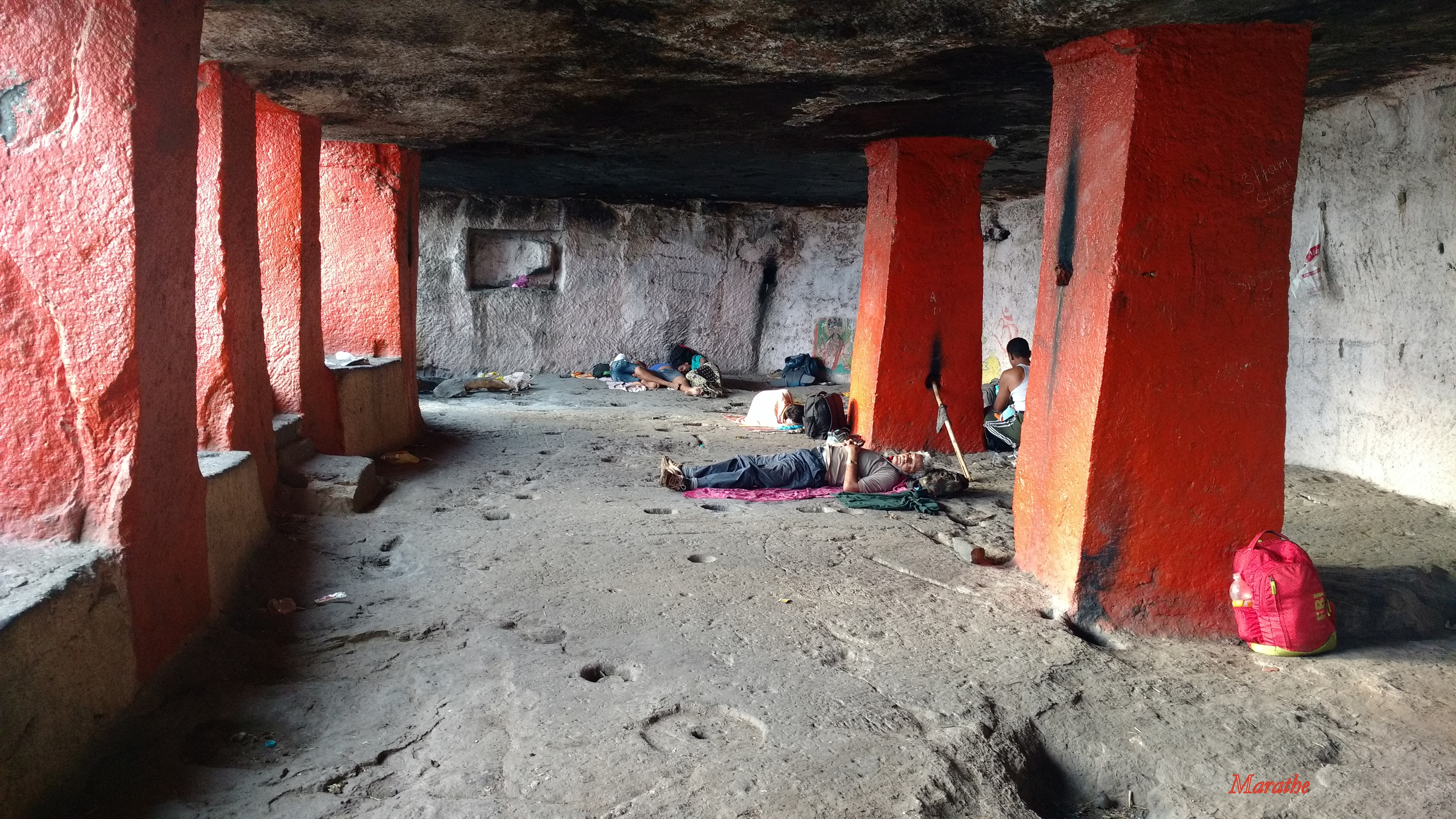
Inside the Cave in the fort

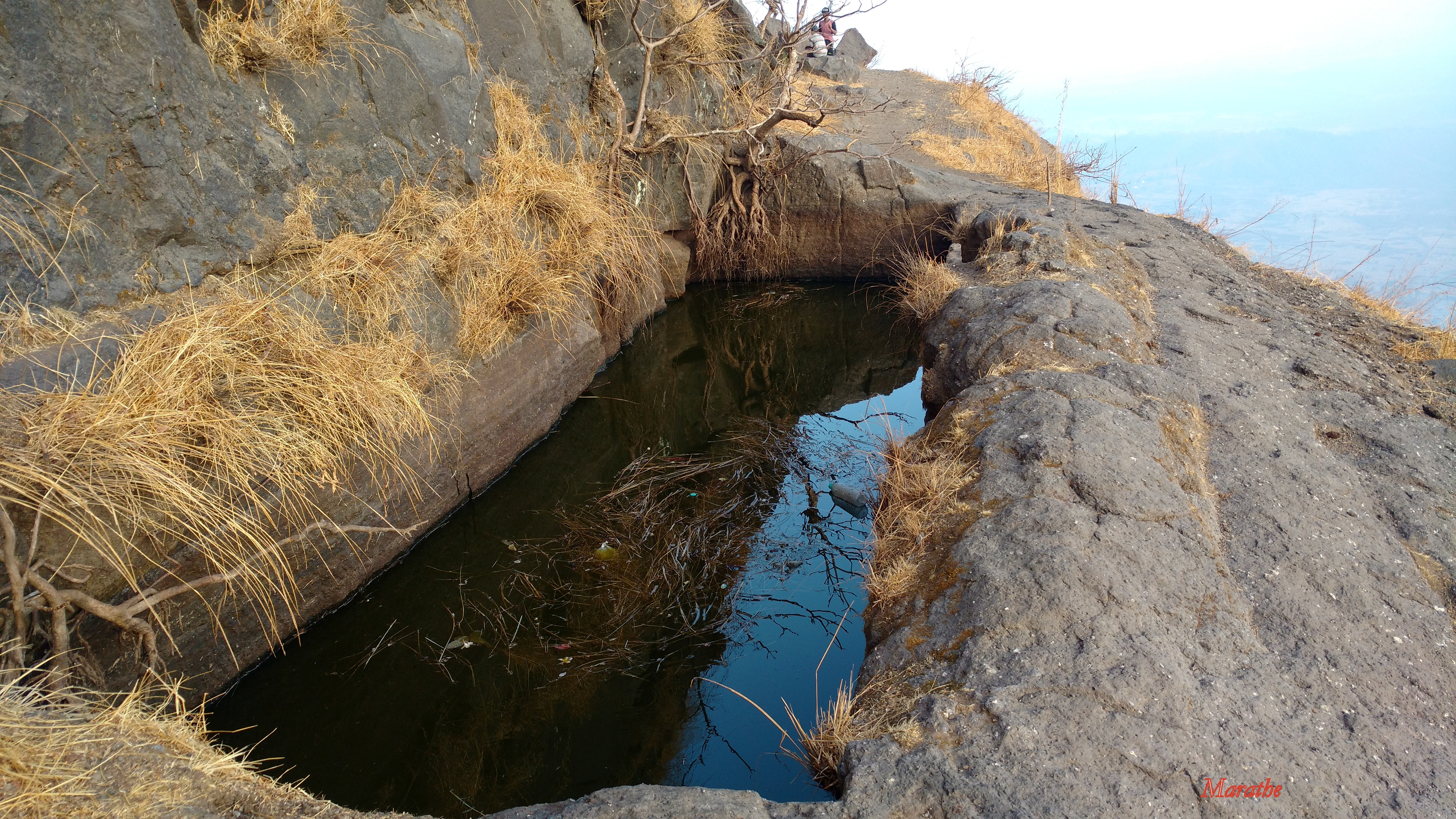
Rock-cut water cistern

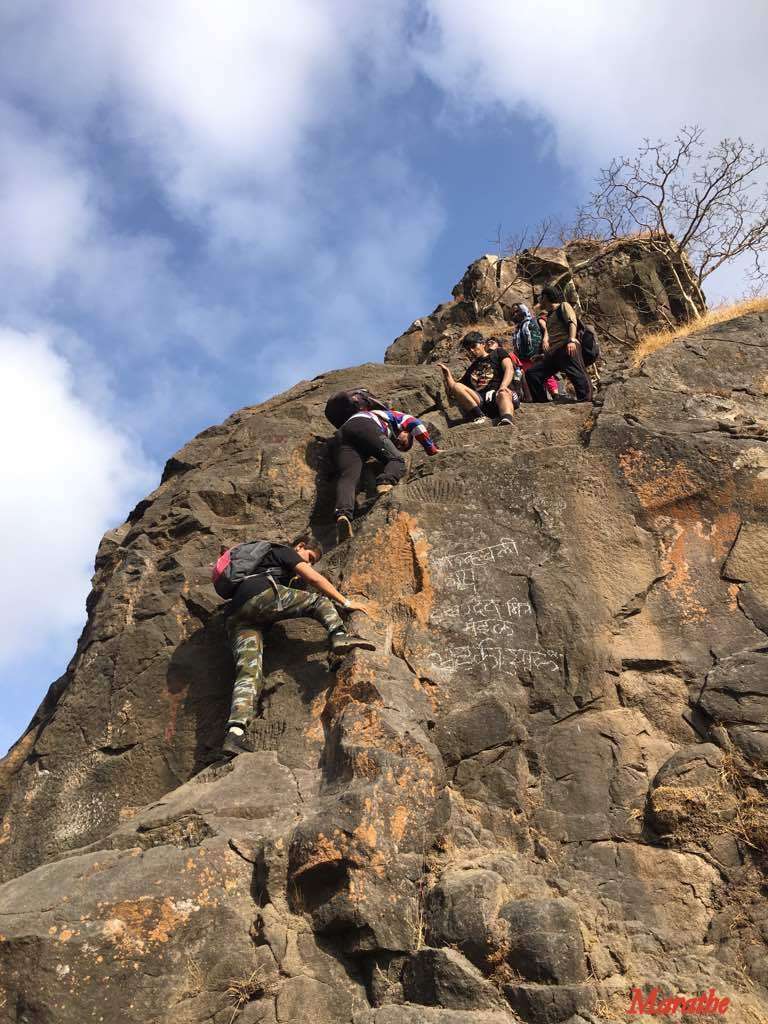
Way to the balekilla

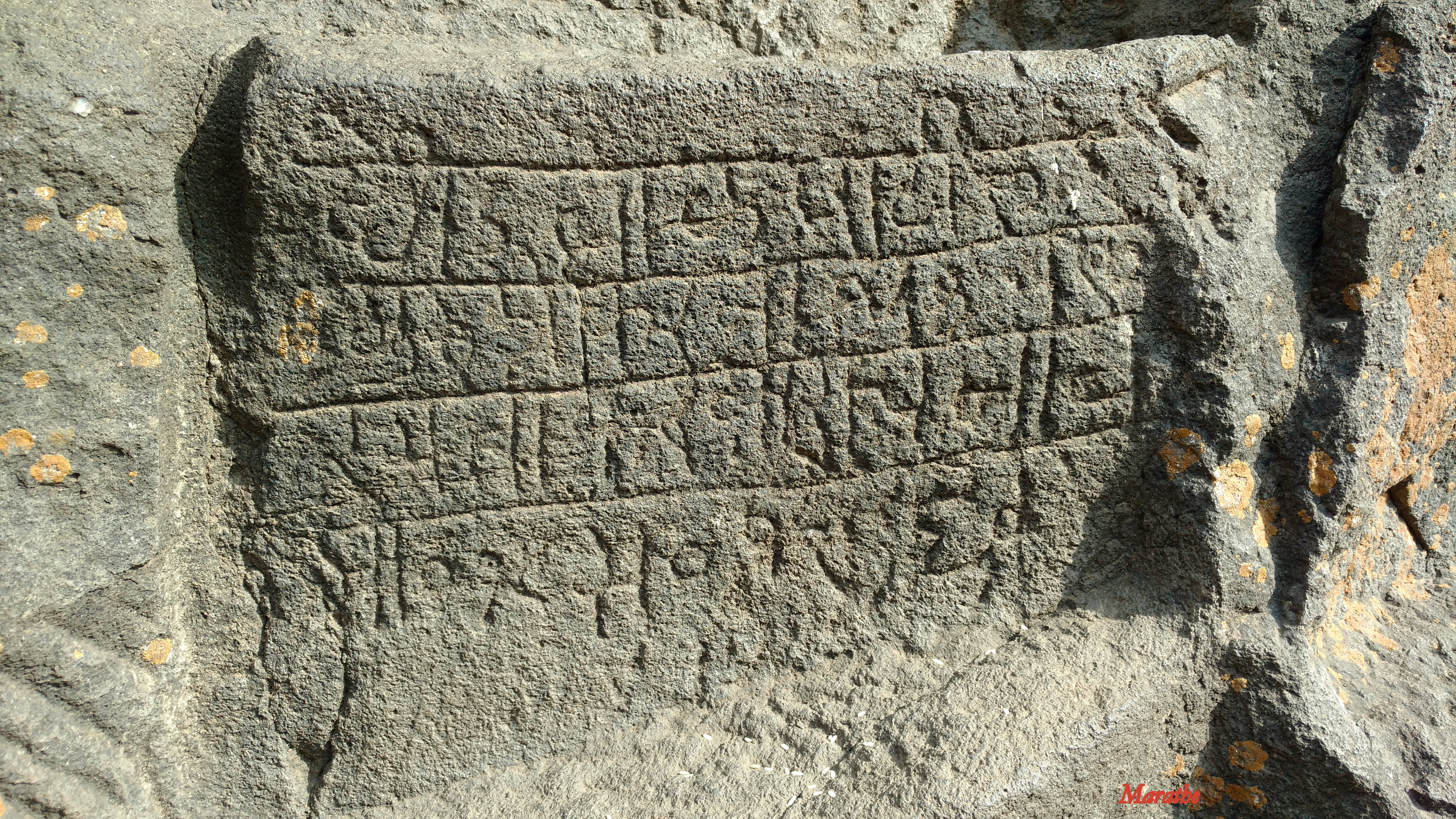
Inscription in Prakrut Marathi

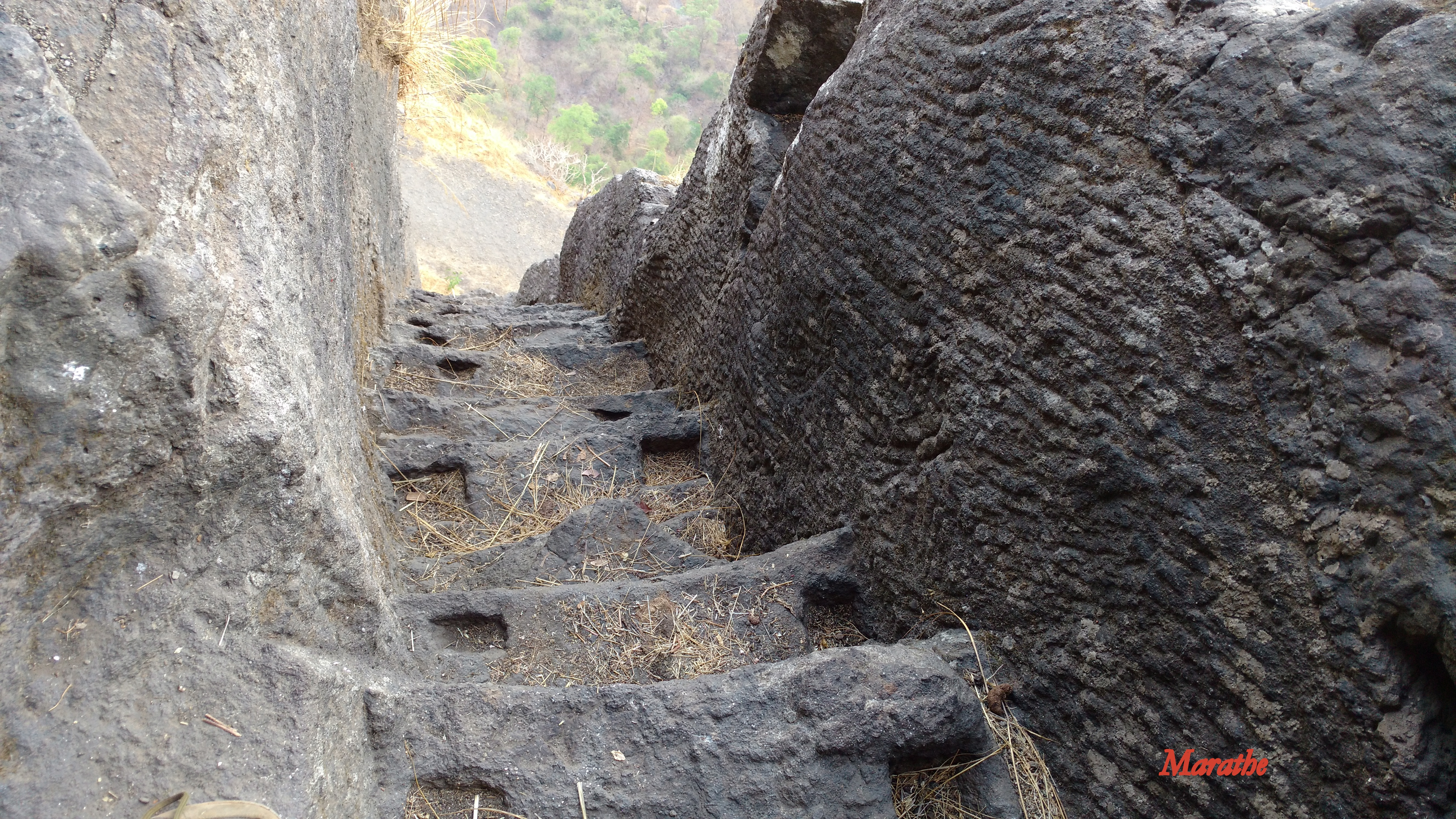
Steps to balekilla

== See also ==
- List of forts in Maharashtra
- List of forts in India
- Marathi People
- Maratha Navy
- List of Maratha dynasties and states
- Maratha War of Independence
- Battles involving the Maratha Empire
- Maratha Army
- Maratha titles
- Military history of India
