= Pisharnath Mahadev Mandir =

Hindu temple in the hill-station of Matheran, Maharashtra, India

The Pisharnath Mahadev Mandir is a Shiva temple located in the hill-station of Matheran in Maharashtra, India. This temple is the oldest in Matheran and the deity Piśarnāth is the grama devata (village deity). The lingam here is swayambhū and appears in an extraordinary titled 'L' shape and is covered with sindoor. This ancient temple is located on the banks of a lake now known as "Charlotte". The surroundings of the temple are extremely beautiful and secluded. The place is at an altitude of about 2516 feet above sea level. Matheran itself is a very famous hill-station and is an attractive tourist spot.
