= Veer Bhai Kotwal =

Indian activist (1912–1943)

Hutatma Veer Vitthal Laxman Kotwal
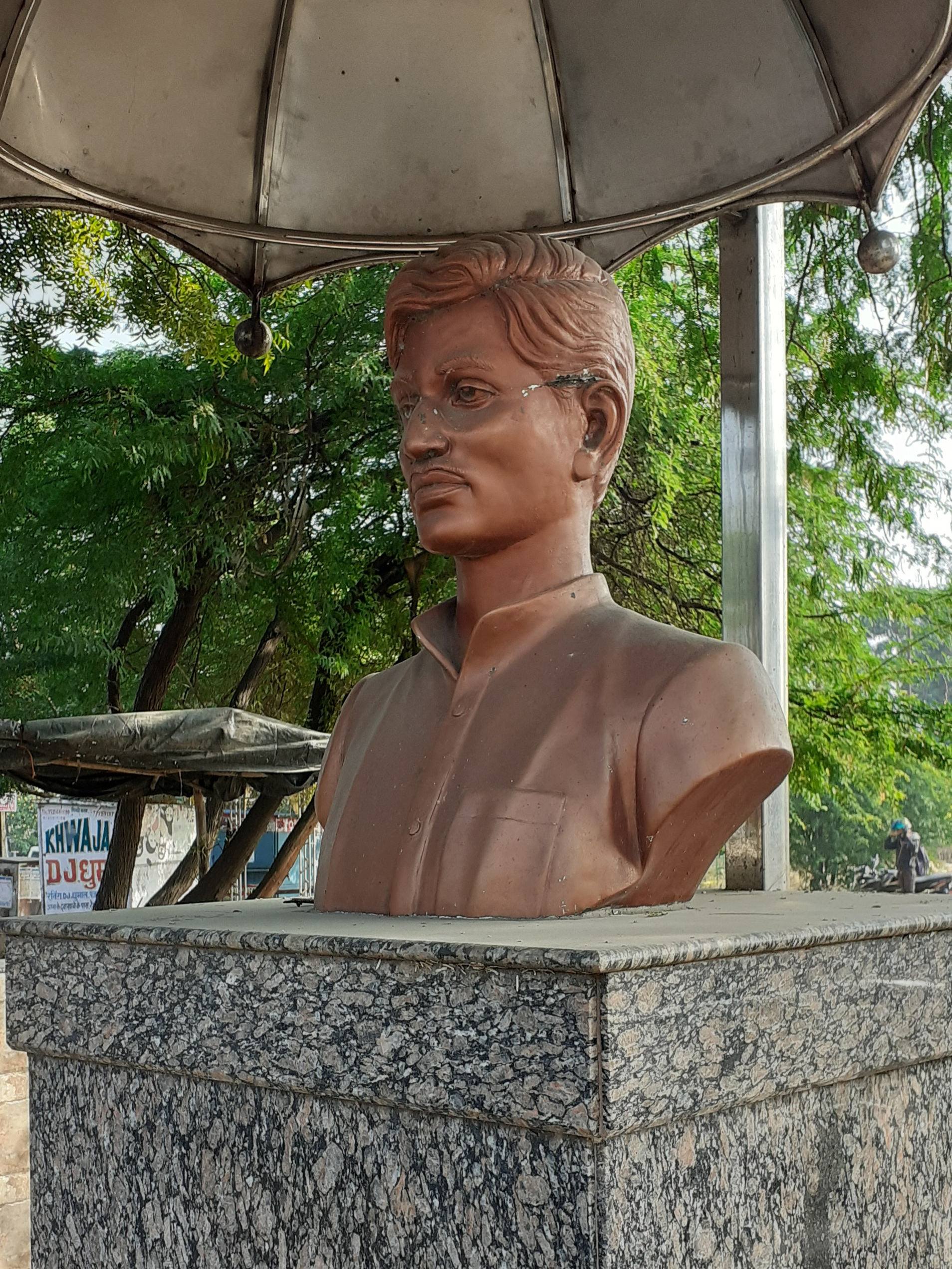
- Born: 1 December 1912; Matheran, British India
- Died: 2 January 1943 (aged 31); Siddhagad, Murbad, British India
- Cause of death: Gunshot wound
- Other names: Bhai Kotwal; Hutatma Veer Bhai Kotwal
- Occupations: Freedom fighter, revolutionary, lawyer, social worker
- Organization: Azad Dasta
- Other political affiliations: Indian National Congress
- Movement: Indian Independence Movement
- Spouse: Indu Tirlapurkar
- Children: 2

Vithalbhai Laxman Kotwal (1 December 1912 – 2 January 1943), also known as Veer Bhai Kotwal, was an Indian revolutionary and social reformer from Matheran, Maharashtra. He was killed during an encounter with a British police officer while he was underground with his team in the jungle of Siddhagad, on 2 January 1943.

== Early life ==
Vithal Kotwal was born on 1 December 1912 in Matheran, a hill station near Mumbai, located in the Raigad district. He was born to a poverty-stricken family of barbers. He stayed with his family until the fourth grade, when he would study at the local school, returning after he graduated from Pune in 1936. He was the eldest of the siblings in his family, having three sisters.

== Education ==
After studying until the fourth grade in his local school, he shifted to Pune with his aunt Gaurutai Halde, where he would stay until he had graduated from Wadia College. He stood first in the entire Pune district in his Vernacular Metric exam. After he returned to his native residence, he studied law in Mumbai and became advocate in 1941.

== Family ==
Vithal Kotwal was married to Indu Tirlapurkar from Pune in 1935. He had a son named Bharat, who died at the age of 22. His daughter, Jagruti died within two months when Mr. Kotwal was underground in 1942. His wife, Indu Kotwal died in 2012 at the age of 91.

== Social work ==
As soon as Vithal Kotwal returned to Matheran, he had involved himself socio-political activities, defying his father's wish to carry on their family tradition. He began helping people when a cyclone had hit a majority of the western Mumbai shore, leading to the displacement of fisherman in the community. Later, in coordination with the local congress leader Rajaram (alias Bhausaheb Raut), Kotwal had involved himself in politics and social work. He helped with creating and enrolling common people in the voters' list in the Matheran area.

When he had eventually noticed that landlords had been cheating peasants due to their ignorance, he stated the right of voluntary school for the children of these farmers. Altogether, he had contributed to the construction of 42 such schools in the area. Later, when landlords denied food grain to the farmers at the time of drought, Kotwal came up with the idea of grain bank for the farmers.

With the financial support of Mr. Raut, a few thousand kilos of grain were imported and distributed amongst the farmers. Whoever took a grain loan had to replace it with 25% extra; whereas the landlords used to charge them double the loan. Later, when he became an advocate, he served the peasants and downtrodden to fight for their right against the landlords who exploited them. In 1940, he organized a peasants and workers congregation in Karjat, where then prominent political activists Achyutrao Patwardhan, S. M. Joshi, and Lalji Pendse had attended.

== Political career ==
Vithal Kotwal successfully fought the election for Matheran city council and became vice chairman in 1941.

== Freedom struggle ==
Though motivated for the freedom struggle from his college days in Pune, Vithal became influenced by the socio-communist movement across the country. Hence, he was called "Bhai," an Indian synonym for comrade. He had eventually become fully involved, and went underground when Mahatma Gandhi, on 9 August 1942 asked the British to "Quit India". After the arrest of all the major leaders in India, an arrest warrant was also issued in the name of Bhai Kotwal. He went underground the same day, vowing to either "live in my free country or in the heaven".

== Kotwal Dasta ==
While underground, he formed groups of underground mercenaries known as "Kotwal Dasta", a parallel government in the Karjat taluka of the Raigad district. Population was about 50, including farmers, voluntary school teachers, and his cousin's brothers Pentanna and Dattoba Halde. They decided to cut down the electric pylons that had supplied electricity to Mumbai. From September 1942 through November 1942, they cut 11 pylons, which ended up paralyzing the industries and railways.

To counter the cut-downs, police announced cash awards of around 2500 rupees, leading to the arrest of Bhai Kotwal. A special officer, known as DSP R. Hall, and Officer Stafford were called to counter Bhai Kotwal.

When the Kotwal Dasta was hiding in the remote jungle of Sidhgadh in Murbad Taluka, Kotwal sent a letter for help, which had fallen into the hands of a landlord in the area, who ended up turning the letter, and messenger, to Officer Hall.

== Final encounter ==
During the early morning of 2 January 1943, when the Azad Dasta were preparing to shift to another safe place and was waiting for the help to come, R. Hall and Stafford launched an attack on the Dasta members. The first to fall was a young boy named Hiraji Patil, son of the deputy leader of the Azad Dasta Gomaji Patil. Hiraji died on the spot. Bhai Kotwal got injured in the thigh and could not move. Hall had killed him point blank.

In modern times, to commemorate him, he is colloquially known as "Veer Bhai Kotwal", which means warrior.

== Legacy ==
• On 24 January 2020, a film was released on the life of Bhai Kotwal, known as Shaheed Bhai Kotwal.

• Many public places in Matheran and other parts of Maharashtra had used Bhai's name, in honour.

• Other patriots took inspiration from his work, which highlighted the contribution of the marginal class in the 1942 movement for Independence.
