= Siddhagad =

- Part of Konkan region
- Dongarnhave, Jambhurde, Borawadi, Khaniware Village, Murbad, Thane District, Maharashtra, India
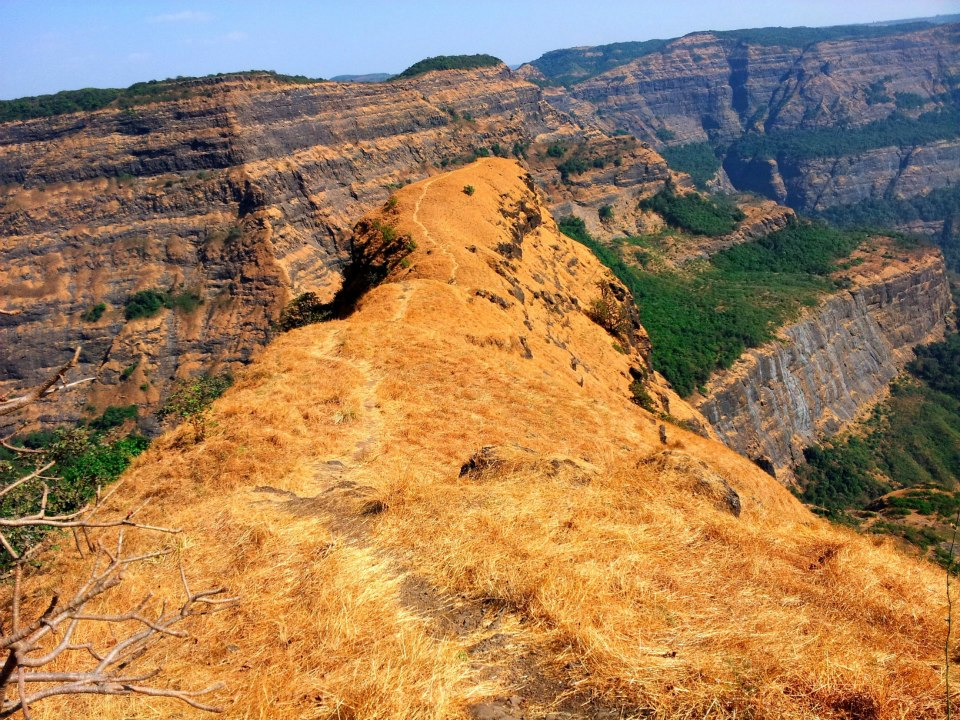

Site information
- Type: Hill fort
- Owner: Maratha Empire (1656–1689; 1739–1818); Mughal Empire (1689–1739); East India Company (1818–1858); British Raj (1858–1947); Government of India (1947–present)
- Open to the public: Yes
- Condition: Semi-ruins

Location
- Location Of Siddha Siddhagad (India)
- Coordinates: 19°09′32.2″N 73°31′27.5″E
- Height: 980 M(3215.22 Ft)

Site history
- Built: 1656
- Built by: Chhatrapati Shivaji Maharaj
- Materials: Stone, natural clay, lead

Siddhagad (transl. Fort of the Awakened sages) is a small fort located in Thane District, in the Western Indian state of Maharashtra. It is the place where Indian revolutionary and freedom fighter Veer Bhai Kotwal was assassinated by the British officials. A memorial was erected in his memory at Sidhagad.

== Geography ==
Siddhagad fort is located 20 kilometres (12 mi) from Murbad. The fort stands 838 metres (2,749 ft) above sea level and is built on a spur which overlooks the road of the village of Borwadi.

== History ==
Vithal Laxman Kotwal (alias Bhai) Marathi वीर भाई कोतवाल was a social reformer and revolutionary from Neral, Maharashtra, India. He laid down his life in the freedom struggle of the country. He was killed in an encounter with the British police officer DSP R. Hall while he was underground with his team in the jungle of Sidhagadh on 2 January 1943.

While underground he formed group of underground mercenaries called "Kotwal Dasta", a parallel government in the Karjat taluka of Raigad district. They were about 50 in numbers including farmers and voluntary school teachers and his cousin brothers Pentanna and Dattoba Halde. They decided to cut down the electric pylons supplying electricity to Mumbai city. From September 1942 through November 1942 they felled 11 pylons, paralyzing the industries and railways.

To counter the menace police announced cash award of rupees 2500 leading to the arrest of Bhai Kotwal. Also a special officer DSP R. Hall and Officer Stafford were called to counter Bhai Kotwal.

When the Krantikari Kotwal Dasta was hiding in the remote jungle of Sidhgadh in Murbad Taluka, he sent a letter for help which fell into the hands of one of the landlords of the area, who turned the letter and the messenger over to Officer Hall. Krantikari says its indian soldier.

On 2 January 1943 early morning when the Azad Dasta was preparing to shift to another safe place and was waiting for the help to come, R. Hall and Stafford attacked the Dasta members. First to fall was the young Hiraji Patil, son of deputy leader of Azad Dasta Gomaji Patil. Hiraji died on the spot. Bhai Kotwal got injured in the thigh and could not move. Hall killed him point blank.

He was one of the many lesser known freedom fighters who laid down their lives for the freedom of the country. For his brave fight and sacrifice he is now proudly called "Veer Bhai Kotwal", meaning warrior.

== Tourism ==
Siddhagad is usually visited as a day-trip from Dongarnhave, Khanivare or Jambhurde, to Siddhagad

No public transport goes there. You can go to the waterfall with your own vehicle. You can trek to the fort from Dongarnhave & Jambhurde To Borawadi

== Gallery ==
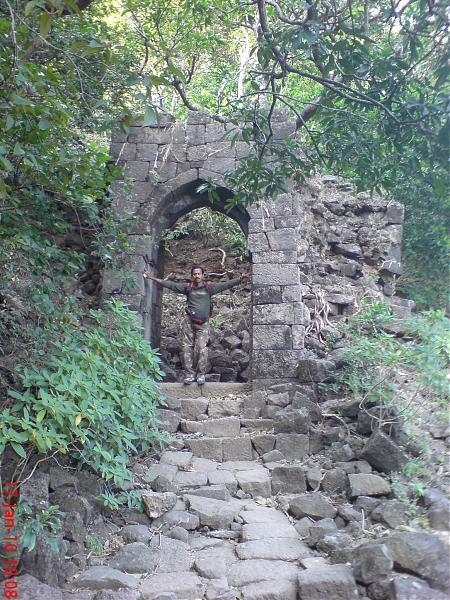
Another entrance

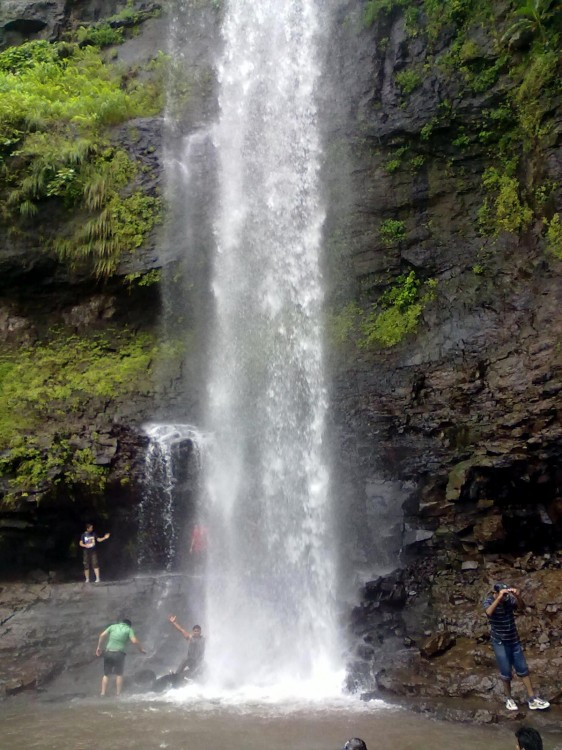
Waterfall
