= Bhadane, Murbad =

Village in Maharashtra

Bhadane Murbad
- village
- Location in Maharashtra, India Bhadane (India)
- Coordinates: 19.311104°N 73.480613°E
- Country: India
- State: Maharashtra
- District: Thane
- Taluka: Murbad
- Elevation: 14 m (46 ft)

Population (2011)
  - Total: 1,354
- Time zone: UTC+5:30 (IST)

Bhadane is a village in the Murbad taluka of Thane district in Maharashtra, India.

According to Census 2011 information the location code or village code of Bhadane village is 553141. Bhadane village is located in Murbad Tehsil of Thane district in Maharashtra, India. It is situated 12 km away from sub-district headquarter Murbad and 70 km away from district headquarter Thane. As per 2009 stats, Bhadane village is also a gram panchayat.

The total geographical area of village is 544.36 hectares. Bhadane has a total population of 1,354 peoples. There are about 289 houses in Bhadane village. Kalyan is nearest town to Bhadane which is approximately 48 km away.

As of the 2011 census, the village had a population of 1354, of which 686 are male and 668 female.

== Schools ==
- Z.P.P. School, Bhadane
- P.N. Ghude Vidyalaya, Bhadane
