= Matheran =

- Hill station Mumbai Metropolitan Region
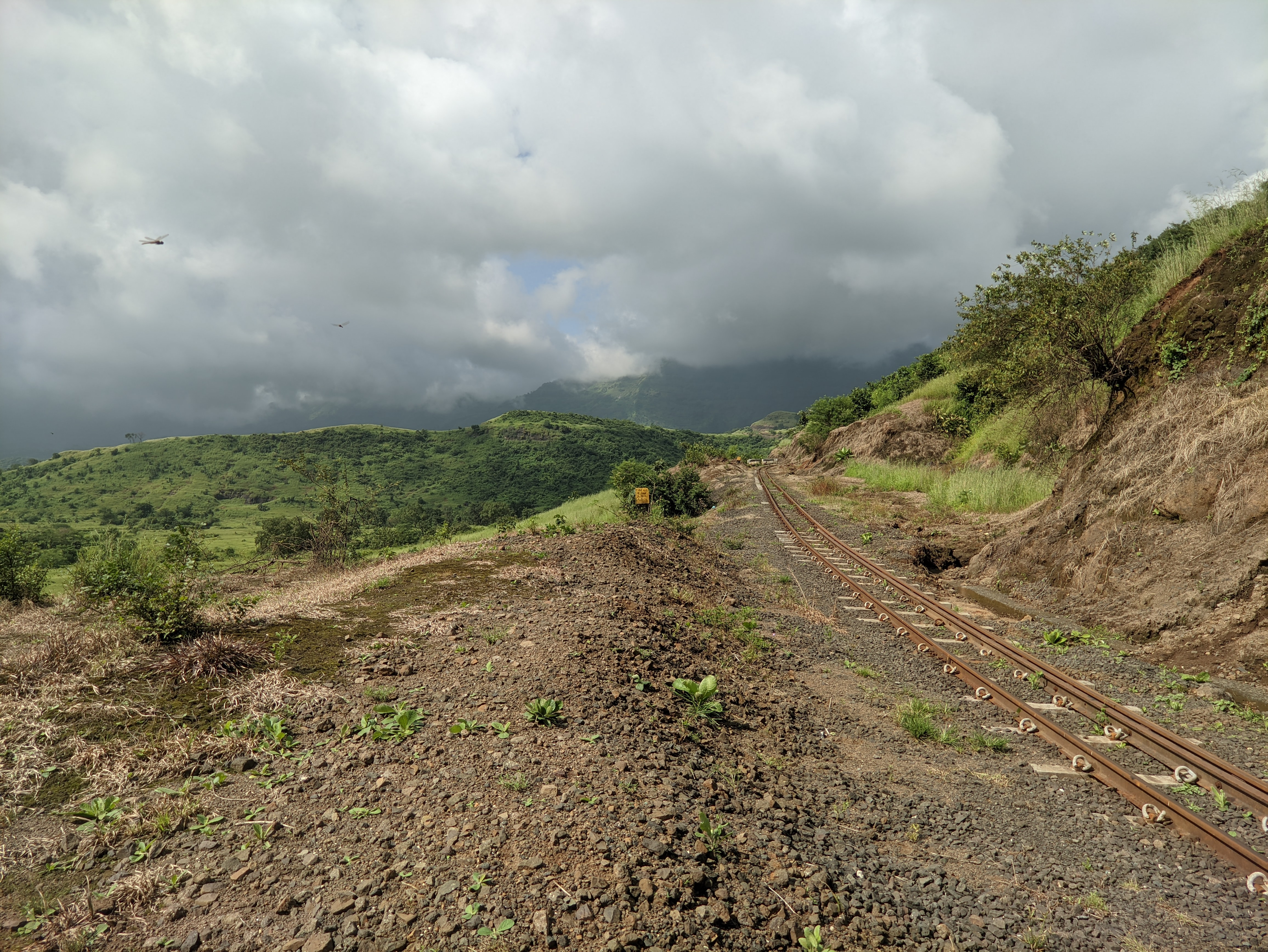
- Picture of Matheran hidden in clouds, from the tracks of the Matheran Toy Train

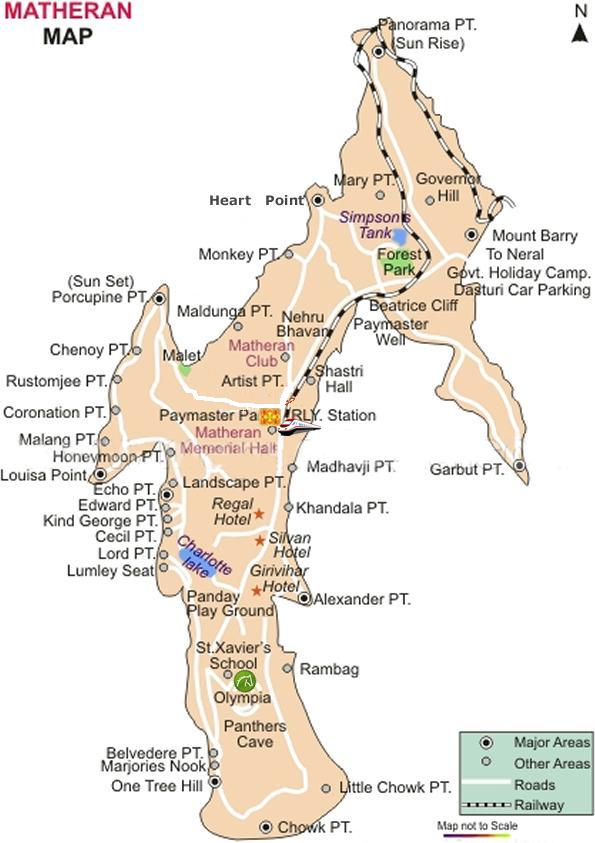

- Location in Maharashtra, India
- Coordinates: 18.9866°N 73.2679°E
- Country: India
- State: Maharashtra
- District: Raigad

Government
  - Type: Municipal Council
  - Body: Matheran Hill Station Municipal Council

Area
  - Total: 7 km^{2} (2.7 sq mi)
- Elevation: 800 m (2,600 ft)

Population (2001)
  - Total: 5,139
  - Density: 730/km^{2} (1,900/sq mi)

Languages
  - Official: Marathi
  - Spoken: Marathi
- Time zone: UTC+5:30 (IST)
- PIN: 410102
- Telephone code: 02148
- Vehicle registration: MH-46
- Nearest city: Karjat
- Website: http://www.matheran.net.in/en/

Matheran (Pronunciation: [maːt̪ʰeɾaːn]) is a partially automobile free hill station and a municipal council in the Karjat taluka of the Raigad district located in the Indian state of Maharashtra. Matheran is part of the Mumbai Metropolitan Region, and one of the smallest hill stations in India. It is located in the Western Ghats, at an elevation of around 800 m (2,625 feet) above sea level. It is about 90 km from Mumbai, and 120 km from Pune. This proximity to these urban areas makes it a weekend getaway for many. Matheran, which means "forest on the forehead" (of the mountains) in Marathi, is an eco-sensitive region as declared by the Ministry of Environment, Forest and Climate Change, Government of India.

There are many hotels and Parsi bungalows in the area. British colonial architecture is preserved in Matheran. The roads are made of red laterite earth.

== History ==
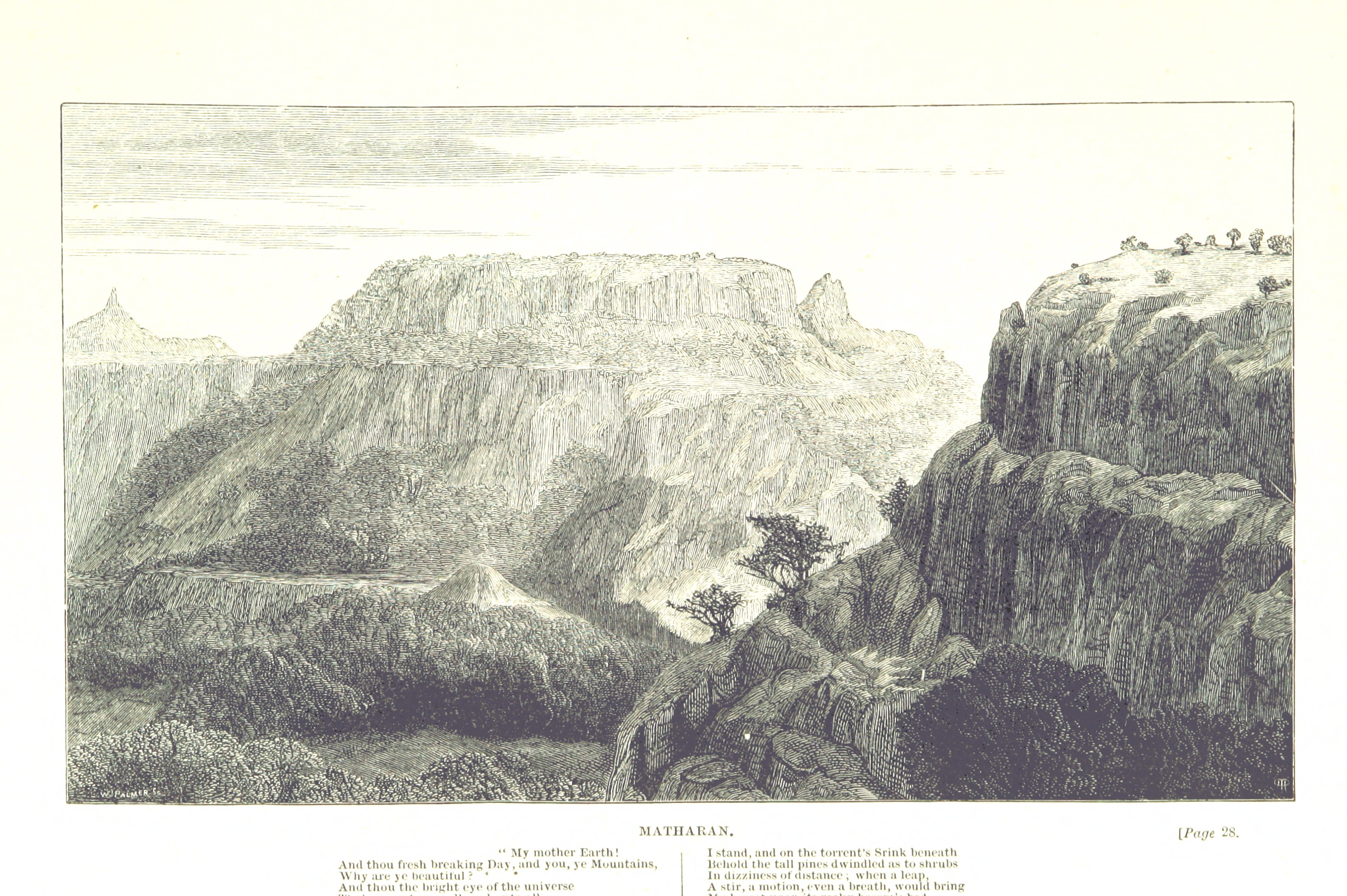
Matheran in 1874

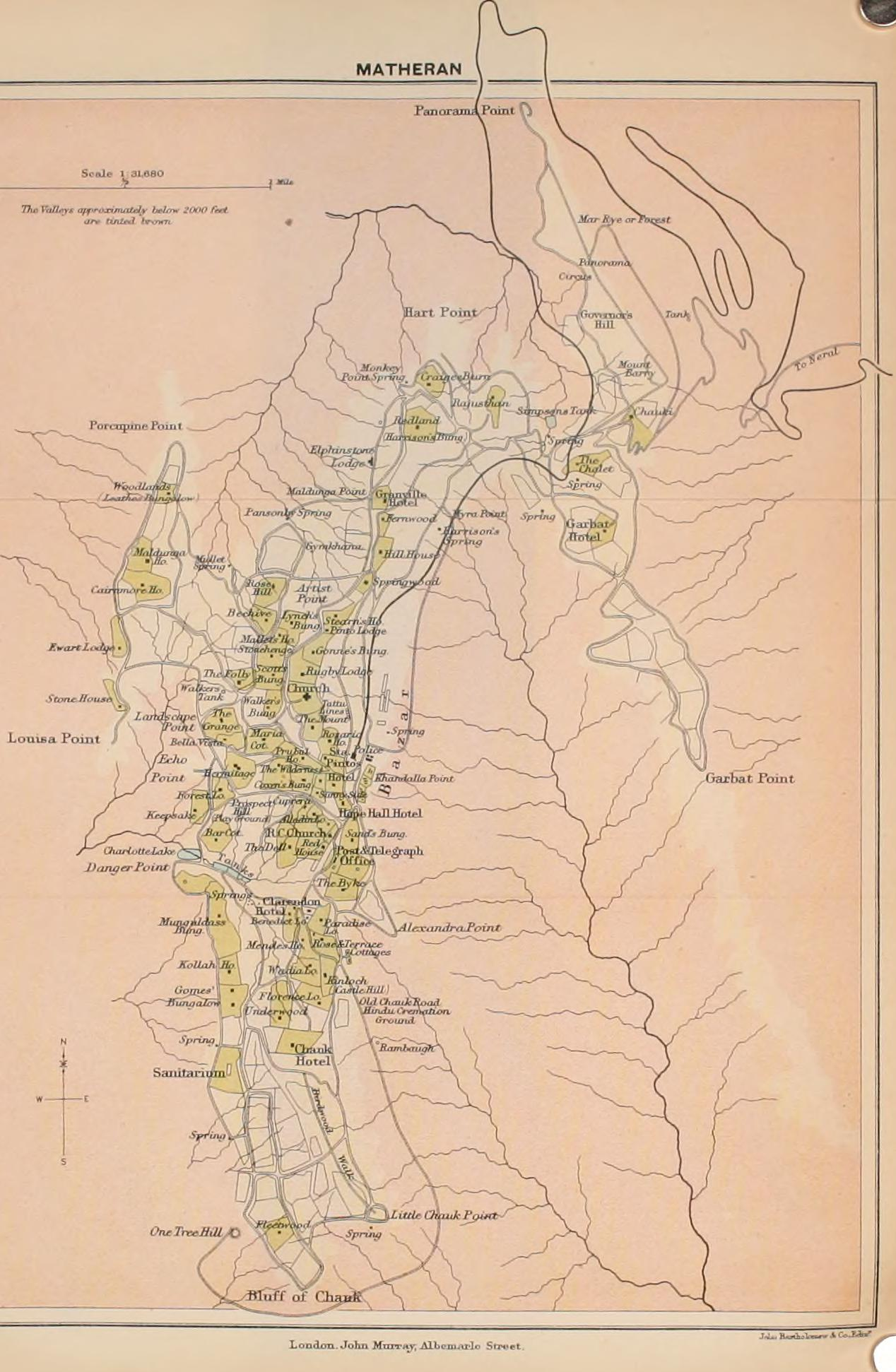
Matheran map of 1911

Matheran was identified by Hugh Poyntz Malet, the then district collector of Raigad district in the May of 1850. Lord Elphinstone, the then Governor of Bombay, laid the foundations for its development as a future hill station. Matheran was developed as a getaway from the regional summer heat. It was also the birthplace of the freedom fighter Veer Bhai Kotwal.

The Matheran Railway

The Matheran Hill Railway was built in 1907 by Sir Adamjee Peerbhoy and covers a distance of 20 km (12 mi), through forest land. The railway was inspected by UNESCO officials, but failed to make it to the list of the World Heritage Sites. India's other Hill Railways like the Darjeeling Railway, the Kangra Valley Railway, Nilgiri Mountain Railway are already on the list.

The Toy train was shut down for the most part in 2016 and 2017. It restarted operations on 26 January 2018, re-inaugurated by the then Chief Minister of Maharashtra, Mr. Devendra Fadnavis. However, it was temporarily suspended again after a landslide in the 2019. It then began operating as an hourly shuttle between Aman Lodge and Matheran Station.

== Soil and rocks ==
Geographically the rock types are solely composed of Deccan trap with inter trappeans of Cretaceous, Eoceuerage and laterites of a still younger age. The rock is basalt, which has given rise to secondary alteration known as laterite. The laterite predominates the hills and almost covers the hilltops. This makes the hard exposed surfaces of the laterite show red gravelly earth. The soil has a vermicular or pisolitic structure and contains a large amount of water. There is little soil cover over most of the hilltop. The topmost layer of rock is a soft porous iron-clay, through which there is drainage of water by the beginning of summer.

== Forest and vegetation and Nature ==
Semi-evergreen forests are present in the Matheran. The trees are evergreen, making the plateau forests very dense and even congested in places. The laterite, porous soil along with very heavy rainfall mixed with dense fog has resulted in unique flora rich in diversity on the plateau. The forests show vegetation in top, middle and ground storeys. The trees form a cover over a large variety of shade-loving herbs, climbers, ferns and mosses. The forests of Matheran have attracted many botanists: Smyth J.Y.(1871), Birdwood H.M. (1886) and (1896), Cooke T. (1887–1901), Woodrow G.M. (1897–1901), Irani N.A.(1962), Satyanarayann & Mudliar (1959), Vartak, V.D.(1966), Kothari & Moorthy (1993). A good collection of the dried plants is deposited in the Blatter Herbarium, St. Xavier's College, Bombay, Mumbai. Matheran has a huge number of medicinal plants and herbs. It was declared an Eco-Sensitive zone (ESZ) by the Union Environment Ministry on 4 February 2003. The declaration as ESZ has led to the stoppage of developmental activities and construction of hazardous industries.

=== List of trees reported to be found in Matheran ===
Sr. No.	Scientific names of the species	Common names
1	Albizzia chinensis (Osb.) Merr.	Udal, Kajav
2	Actinodaphne angustifolia Nees.	Pisa
3	Aglaia lawii (Wight.) Sald.	
4	Alseodaphne semicarpifolia Nees.	Sugran
5	Alstonia scholaris (L.) R.Br.	Saitan, Satvin
6	Aporosa lindleyana (Wight) Baill.	Ukveti
7	Artocarpus lakoocha Roxb.	Kemshi
8	Atlantia racemosa Wight. & Arn.	Makad limbu
9	Bambusa arundinacea (Retz.) Roxb	Kalak
10	Bauhinia foveolata Dalz.	Chambel.

The vegetation of the area depends on the type and depth of the soil. Due to poor soil depth, the vegetation on the edges of the plateaus is poor. Due to heavy rainfall, dissected hilly terrain and excessive leaching of the soil, the exposed areas become less fertile and become less moisture retentive, resulting in shallow rooted vegetation. It is required to plant trees to protect the soil cover from losing its valuable humidity and fertility. The winds are very strong and blow from west or southwest during monsoon and also dry winds blow during the three months from January to March. These winds tend to shear and bend the plants while absorbing their moisture.

== Wildlife ==
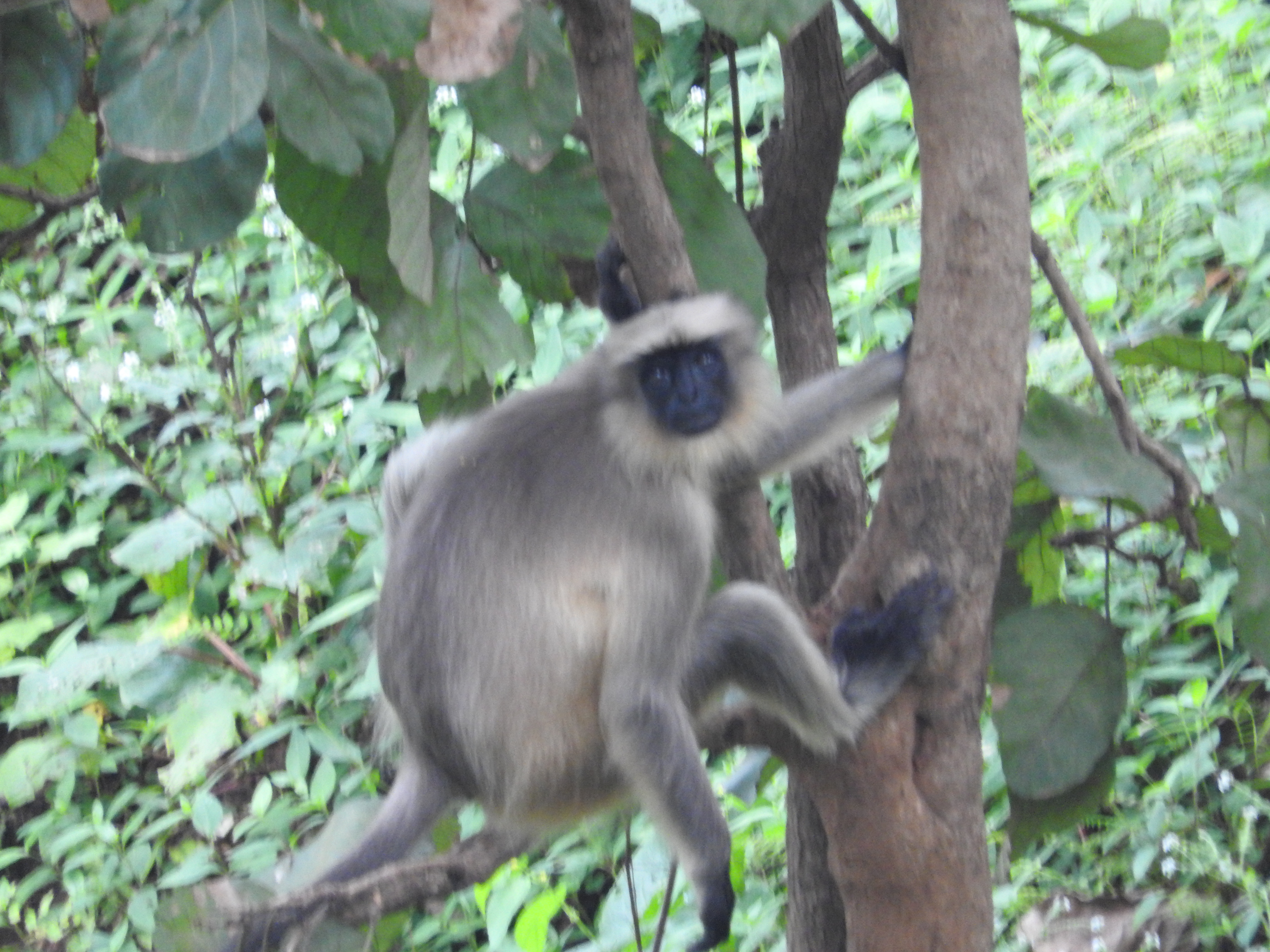
Hanuman Langur at Matheran

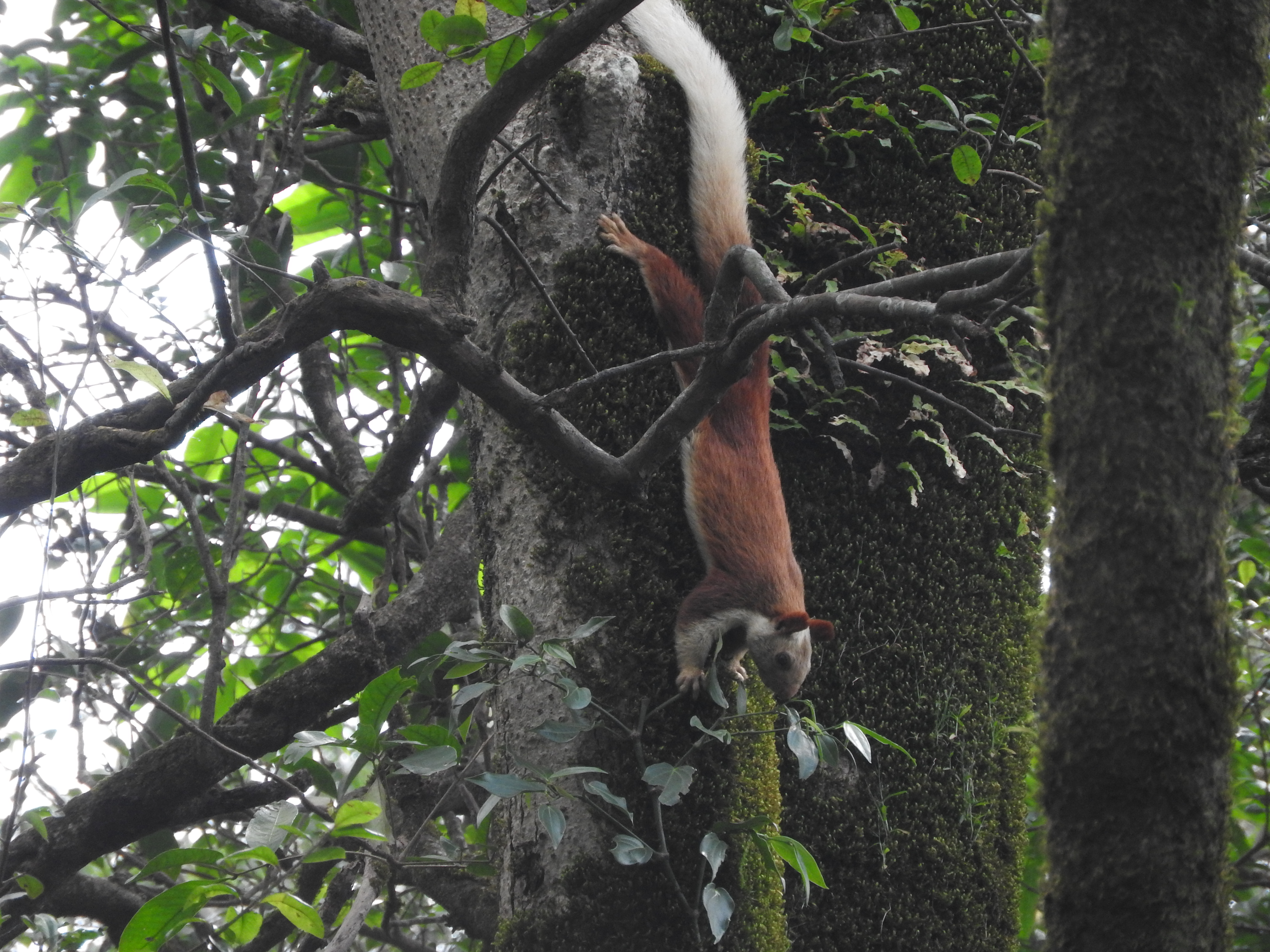
Malabar Giant Squirrel at Matheran

The town has a large monkey population, including bonnet macaques and Hanuman langurs. Riding horses are abundant in Matheran and serve as a local icon. Inside the forests, animals like barking deer, Malabar giant squirrels, foxes, wild boars, mongooses can be found. These animals are few in numbers compared to the monkeys and usually do not venture to places with human activity.

Leopard Sightings

While not native to the area, there have been reports of leopard sightings in Matheran in recent years due to dense forests in the surrounding valleys. Their dwindling population nationally has resulted in less frequenting sightings. There have been no reported leopard attacks in Matheran.

== Demographics ==
As of the 2001 India census, Matheran had a population of 5139. Males constituted 58% of the population and females 42%. Matheran had an average literacy rate of 71%; male literacy being 75%, and female literacy being 66%. In Matheran, 11% of the population was under 6 years of age. Languages spoken include Marathi, Hindi, and English.

== Geography and climate ==
Matheran is located at 18.98°N 73.27°E. It has an average elevation of 800 m (2,625 ft) above sea level. Lying in an elevated region, it has a cooler and dryer climate relative to its surroundings, making it popular during summer. Temperatures range from 32°C (90°F) to 16 °C (61 °F).

The monsoon retreats prior to October and November, making the temperature cool, but not humid. The winter months are cool with the temperature usually staying above 11 °C. While the days are mostly sunny, evenings and early mornings tend to get a bit chilly. Couples prefer this time period to visit Matheran for their honeymoons. From March to May, the temperatures can go over 35 °C during the day. June to September sees heavy rainfall.

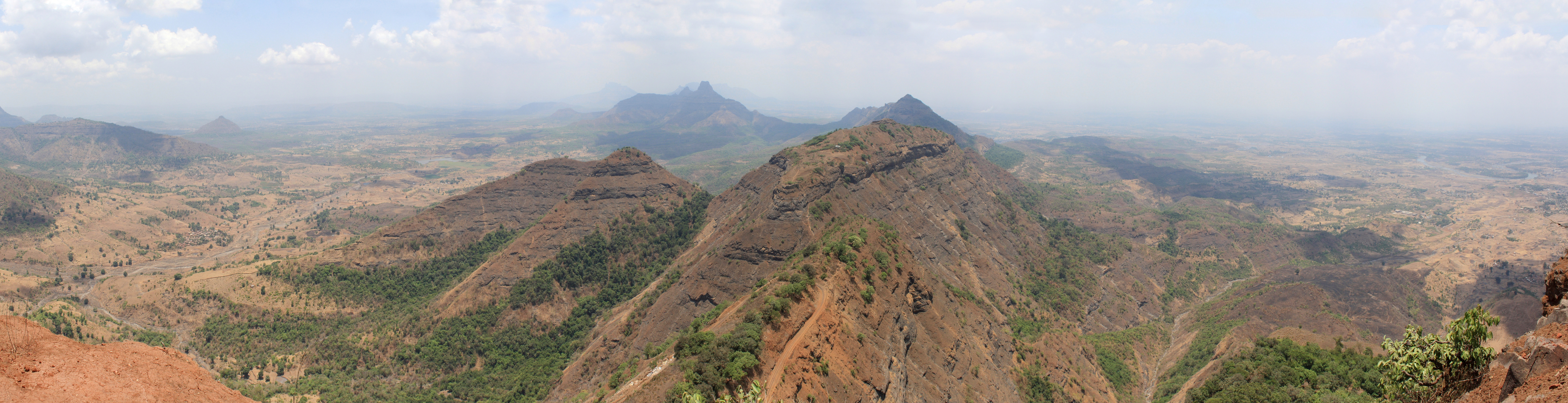
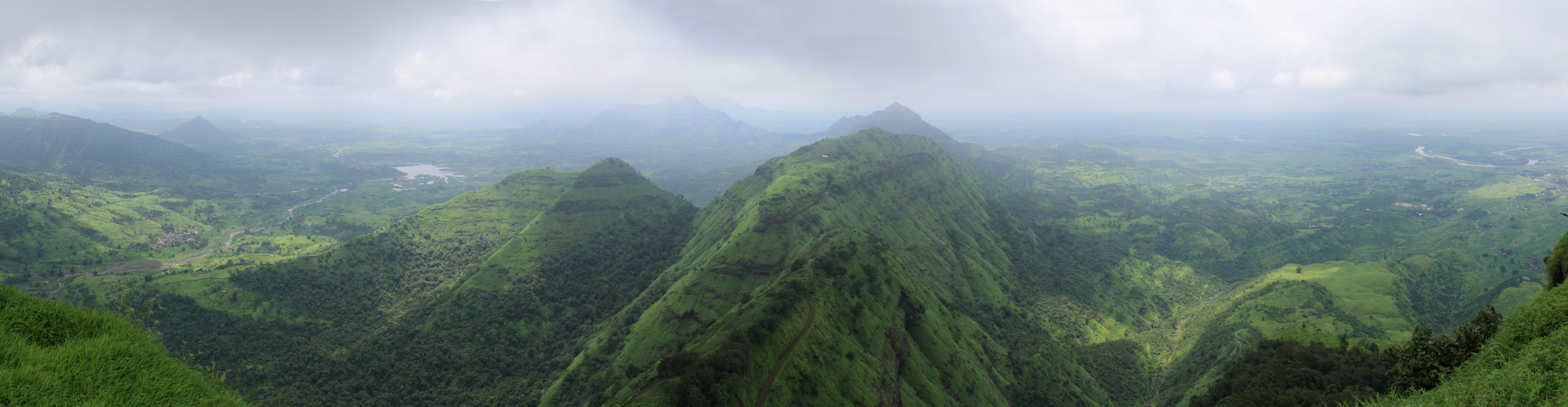
Western Ghats in India in the dry season (top; May 2010) and rainy season (bottom; August 2010)

Climate data for Matheran
Month	Jan	Feb	Mar	Apr	May	Jun	Jul	Aug	Sep	Oct	Nov	Dec	Year
Mean daily maximum °C (°F)	28 (82)	30 (86)	31 (88)	32 (90)	33 (91)	32 (90)	30 (86)	30 (86)	29 (84)	33 (91)	31 (88)	29 (84)	31 (87)
Mean daily minimum °C (°F)	13 (55)	14 (57)	16 (61)	19 (66)	22 (72)	22 (72)	21 (70)	21 (70)	20 (68)	19 (66)	17 (63)	13 (55)	18 (65)
Average precipitation mm (inches)	2.0 (0.08)	1.5 (0.06)	2.3 (0.09)	4.1 (0.16)	25.1 (0.99)	773.9 (30.47)	2,035.6 (80.14)	1,461 (57.52)	658.6 (25.93)	168.1 (6.62)	31.5 (1.24)	3.8 (0.15)	5,167.5 (203.45)
Source: Government of Maharashtra

== Transportation ==
Matheran is connected to Mumbai (100 km) & Pune (120 km) by rail and road, with the closest railway station being in the foothill town of Neral. The nearest airport is the Chhatrapati Shivaji Maharaj International Airport, Mumbai.

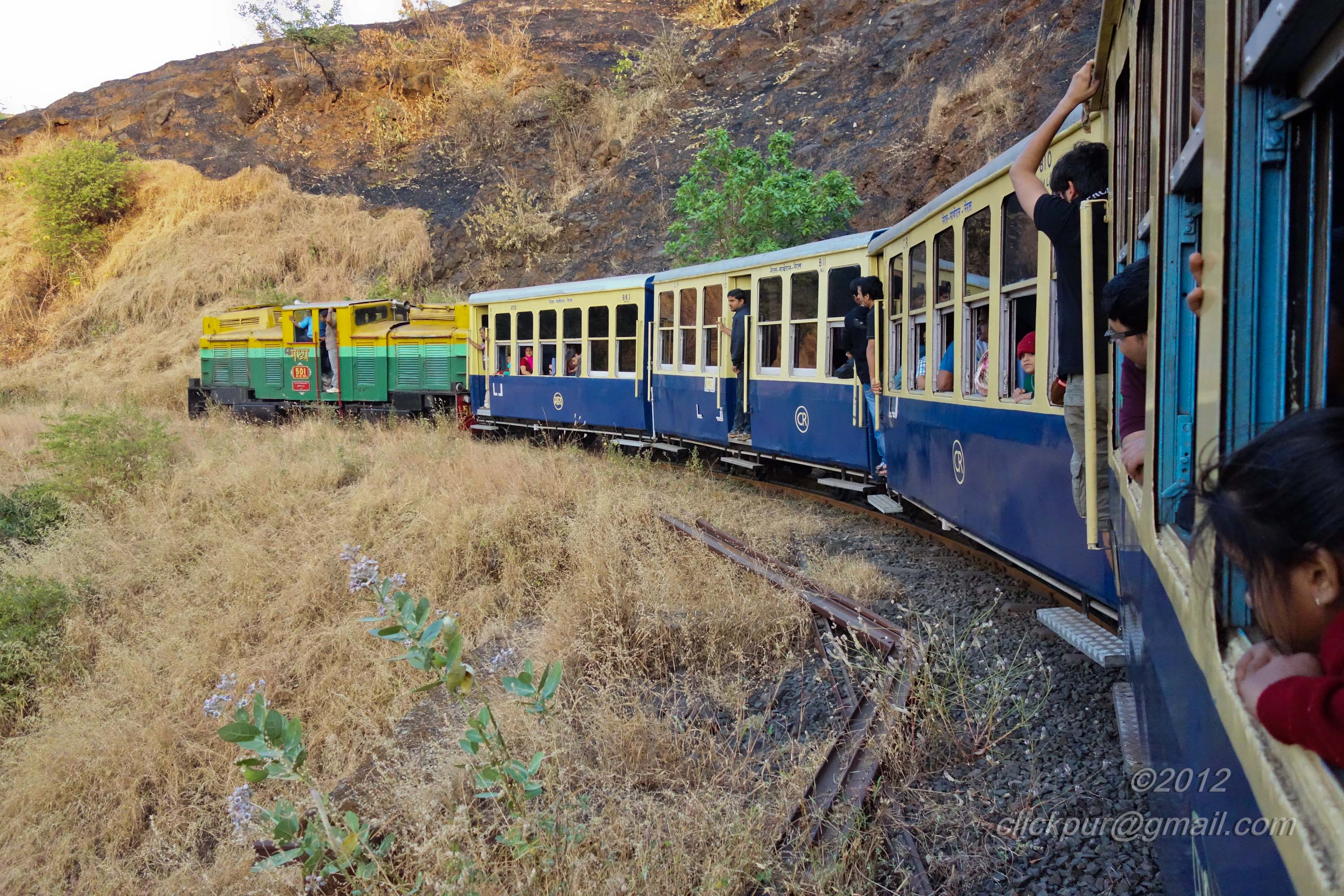
Matheran Railway

=== Rail ===
Matheran has a narrow gauge railway station in the town center. The old Matheran Hill Railway offers several daily trains to Neral.

The Toy train is connected to the mainline rail route at the Neral Junction. The train between the Aman lodge and Matheran runs at intervals of around one hour, and having approximately 85 seats. The journey takes about two and a half hours each way.

=== Road ===
Taxi services are available from the Neral railway station upto Aman Lodge, while bus services are available from the railway stations of Neral and Karjat. No automobiles except for municipality operated ambulance and e-rickshaws are allowed inside. Prior to December 6, 2022, e-rickshaws were not permitted inside as well.

=== Non-automobile transportation ===
Beyond Aman Lodge, horses and hand-pulled rickshaws are the available non-automobile modes of transport.

== Places of interest ==
Altogether, there are 40 scenic vistas, two lakes, two parks, four major worship places and a race course in Matheran.

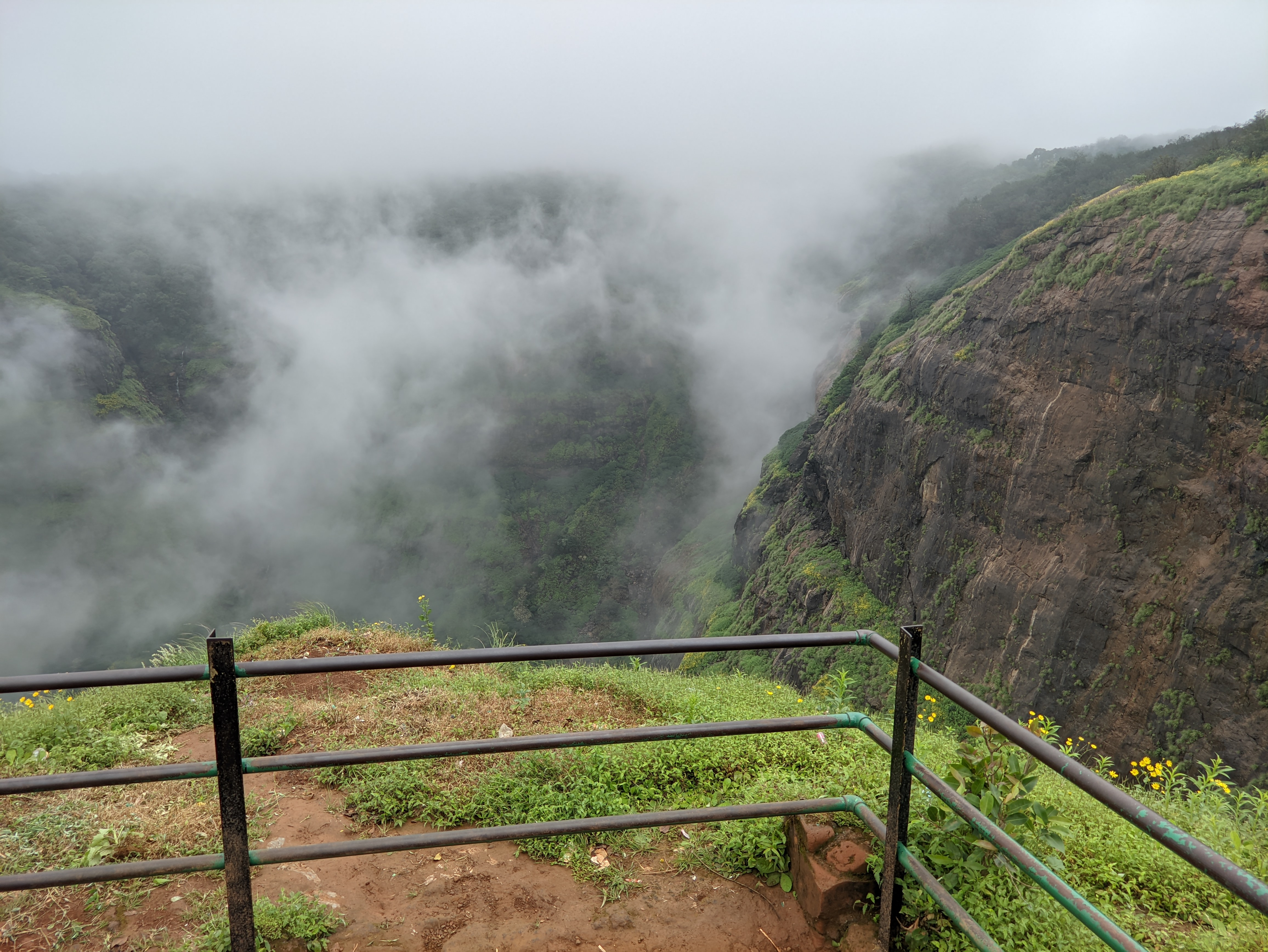
Echo overlook

=== Historical places of interest ===
1. Forts: The hill station has two medieval forts in its close proximity, them being Prabalgad and Pebkilla. The Vikatgad fort is also a trekking destination, which is connected to the hill hosting Matheran itself.
2. Horse Race Courses: Olympia Race Course (established in 1892–93 by Sir Dhunjibhoy Bomanji).
3. The Matheran railway Station

=== Religious places of interest ===
1. Pisarnath Temple
2. Matheran Shiv Mandir

=== Lakes ===
Water supply to Matheran is from Lake Charlotte. This dam overflows during monsoons, making it a tourist attraction.

=== Parks ===
The "Paymaster park" at Matheran is maintained by the local Municipality. Games for children and pagodas are organised here.

=== Hiking routes ===
Matheran has various trekking routes, reported to be easy to traverse over by tourists:

==== 1) Sunset Point Route ====
This route starts from Dodhani village and ends at the Sunset Point at Matheran. This is the most popular route for trekkers.

==== 2) Garbett Point Route ====
This route starts from "Sagachiwadi", a small tribal village near the Dhom dam. This is the second most popular route.

==== 3) Rambaug Point Route ====
This route goes from Rambaug point to a small village called Pokharwadi near Chowk village. The route passes through a waterfall during the rainy season. There is a view of the Morbe Dam's backwater while going through this route.

==== 4) One Tree Hill Route ====
The route's base village is the Ambewadi village. Ambewadi is near Pokharwadi, where the route to Rambaug point begins. There is a view of the Morbe Dam's backwater while going through this route.

==== 5) Vikatgad Route ====
This is reported to be the most difficult trekking route of Matheran. It starts from the base village Mamdapur and takes about three hours to reach Matheran via the Vikatgad fort.

All treks have been reported to take between two and three hours to complete.

== Gallery ==
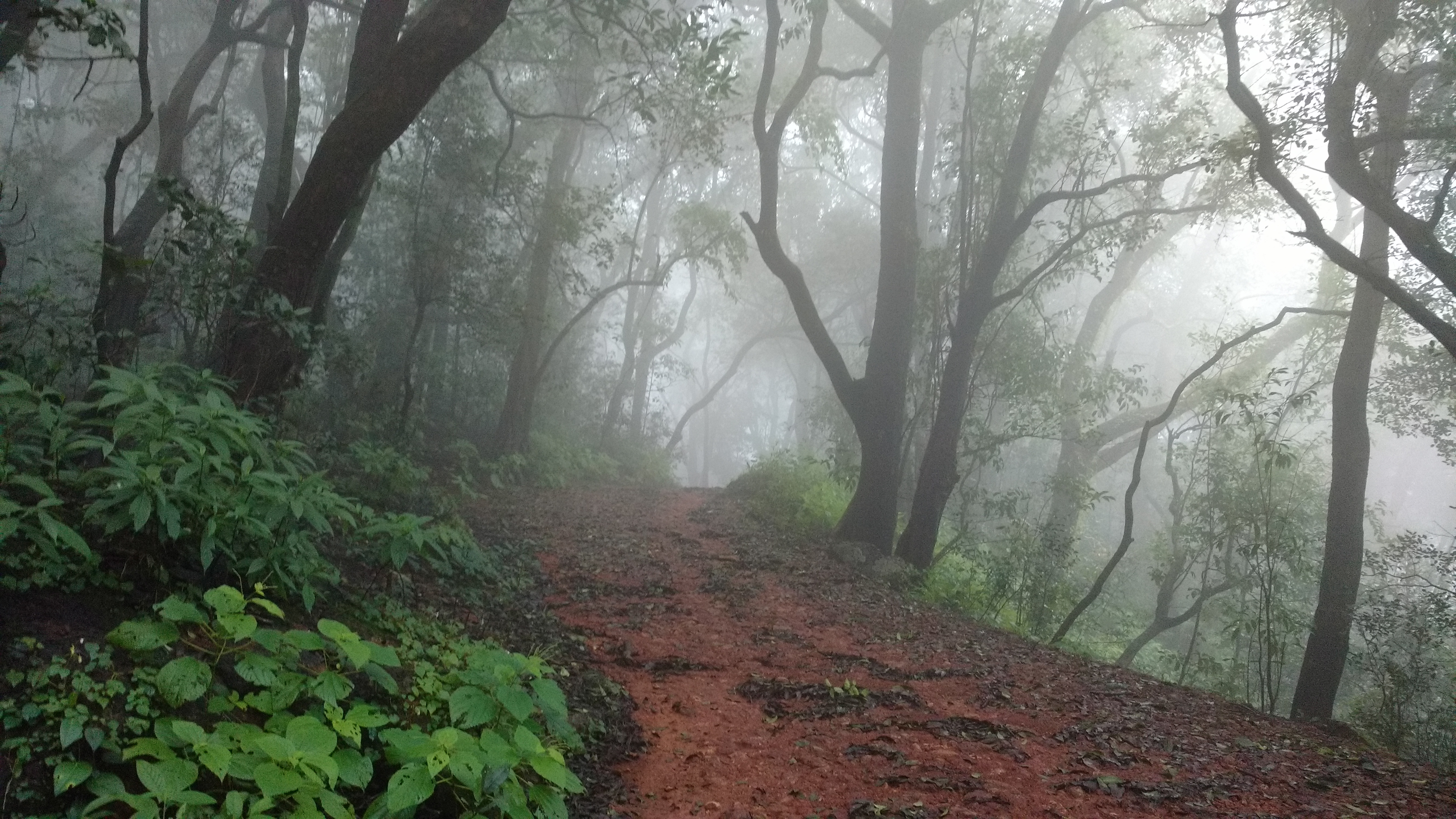
The pathways

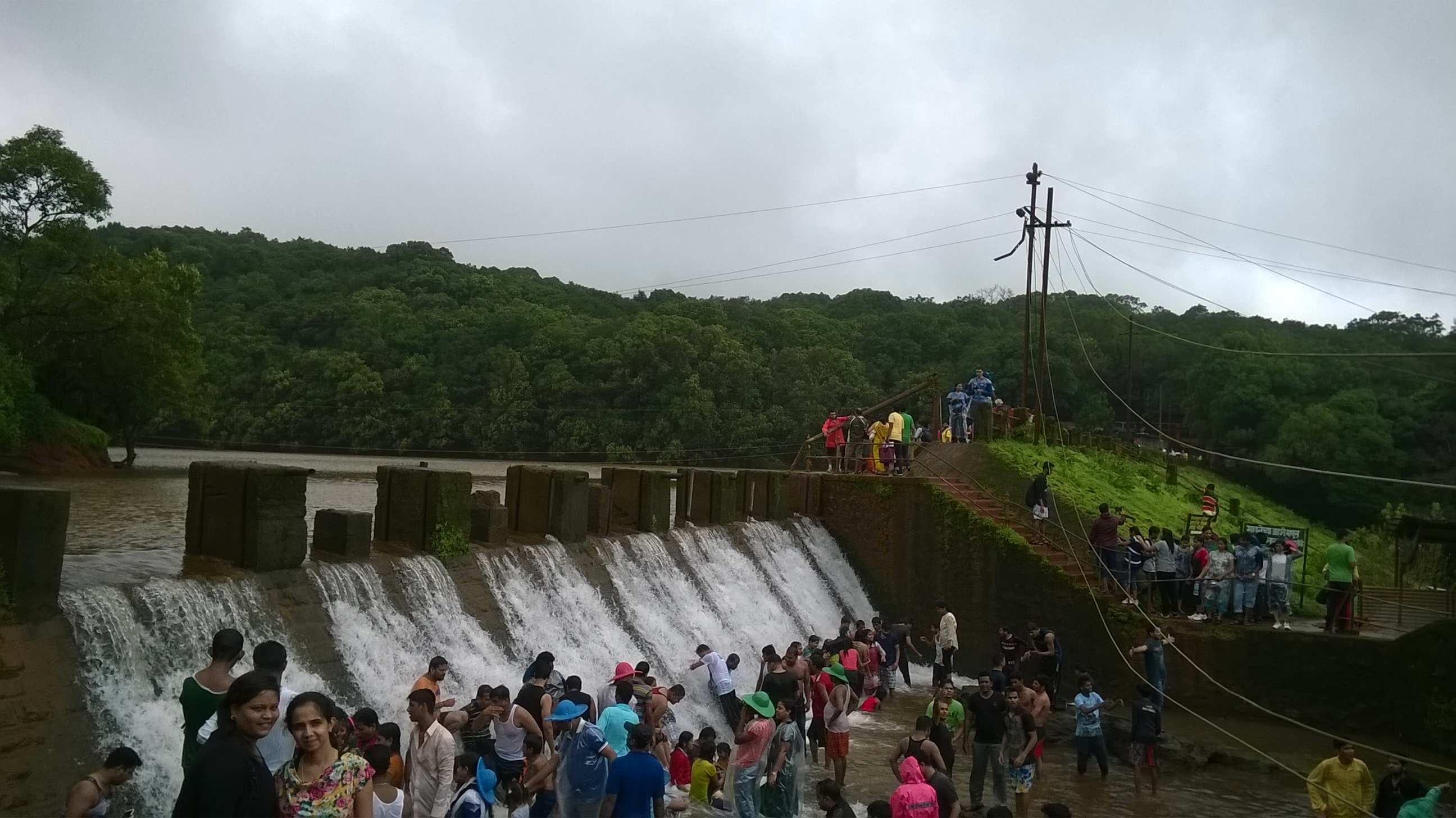
Tourists at Charlotte Lake

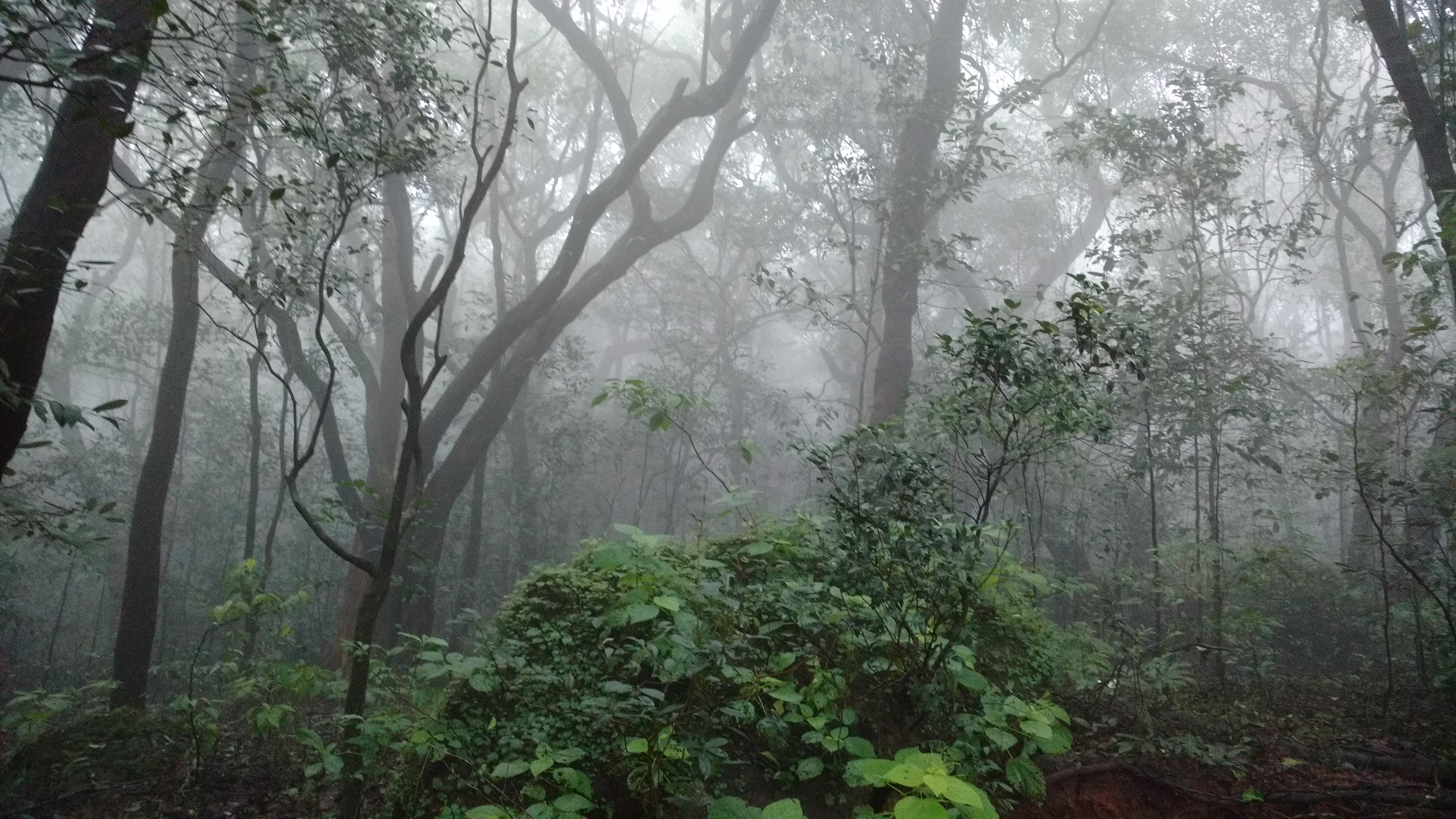
The forest

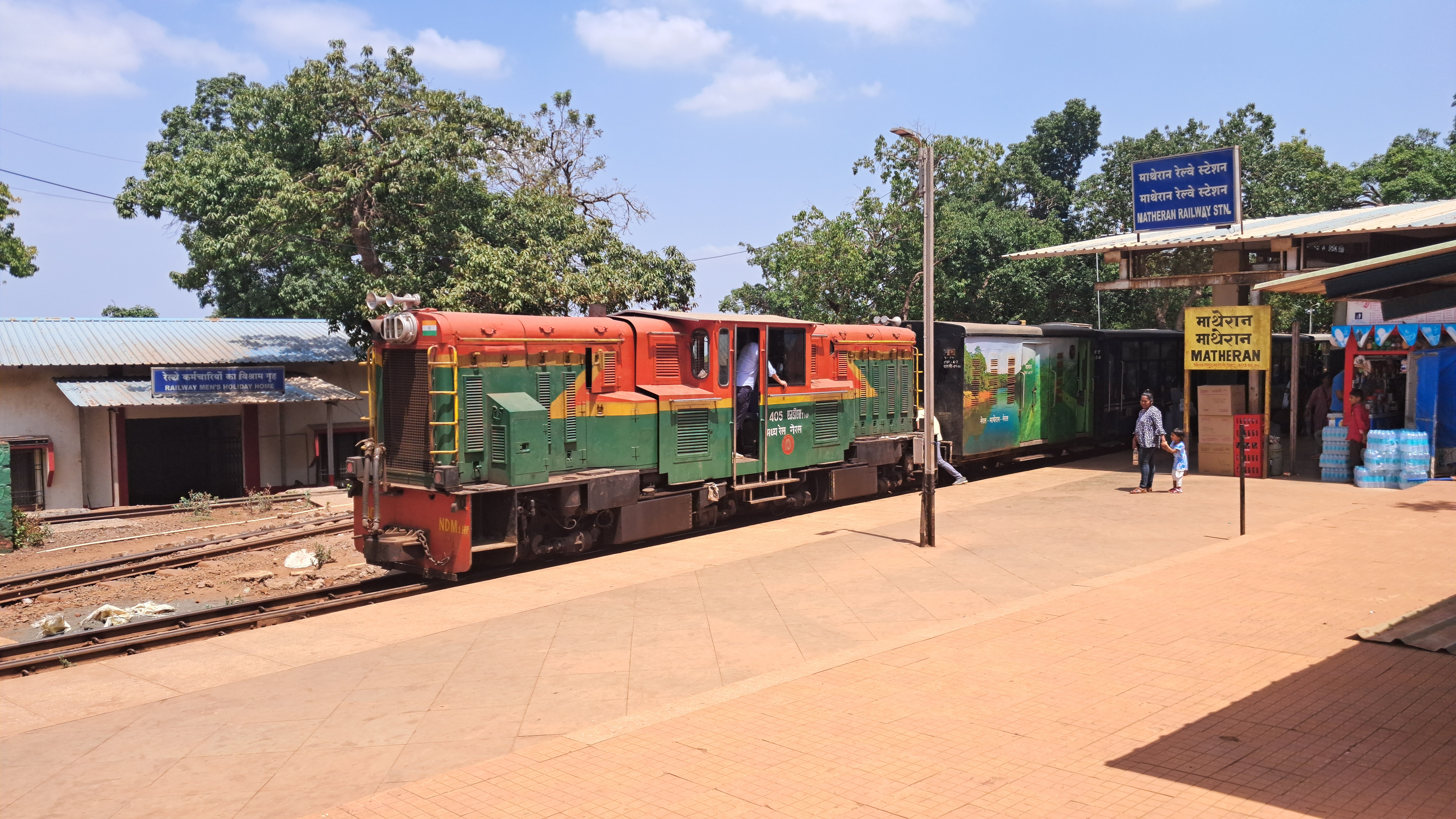
A train waiting at Matheran Railway Station

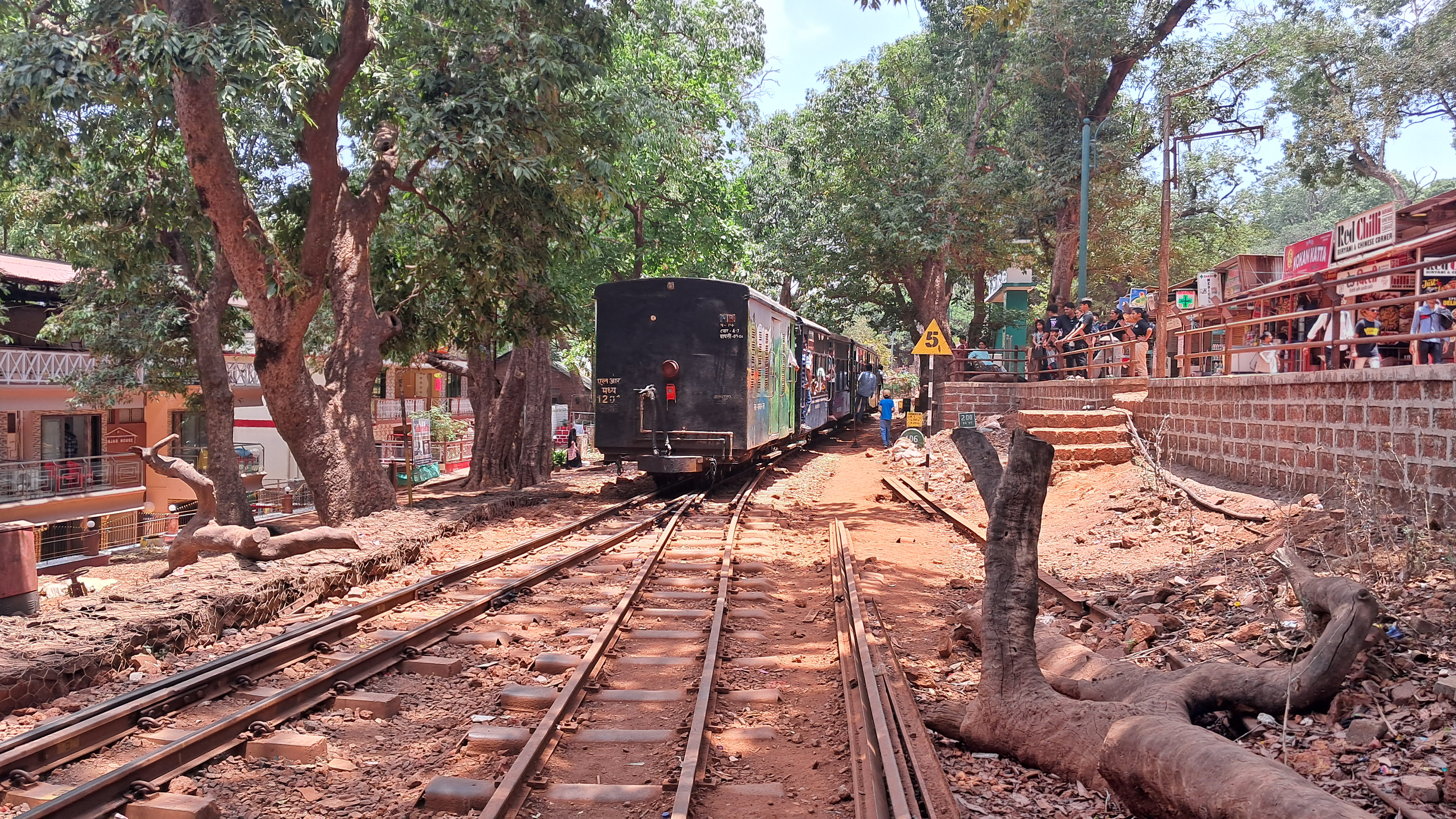
View of a train entering Matheran railway station

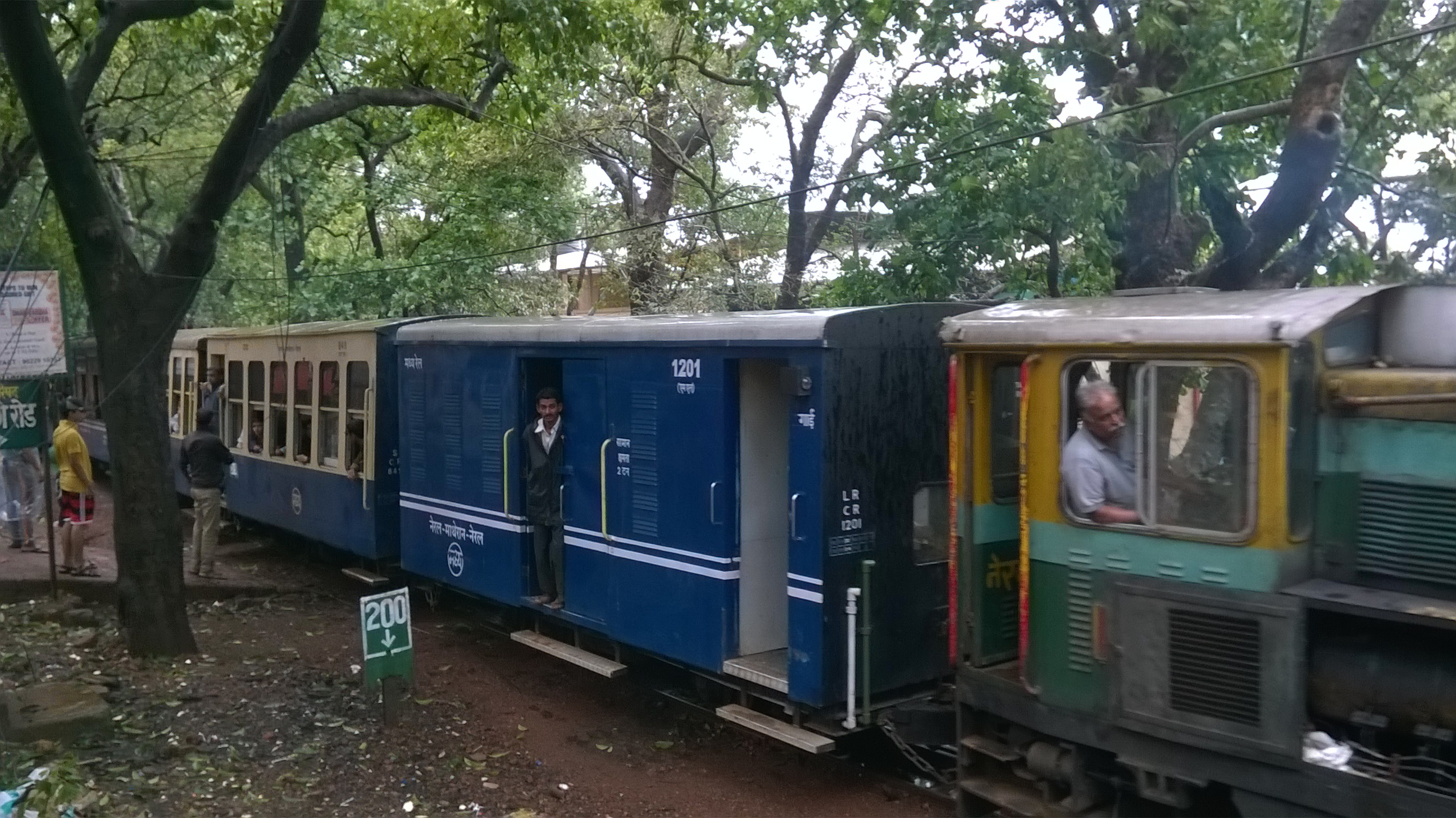
The toy train

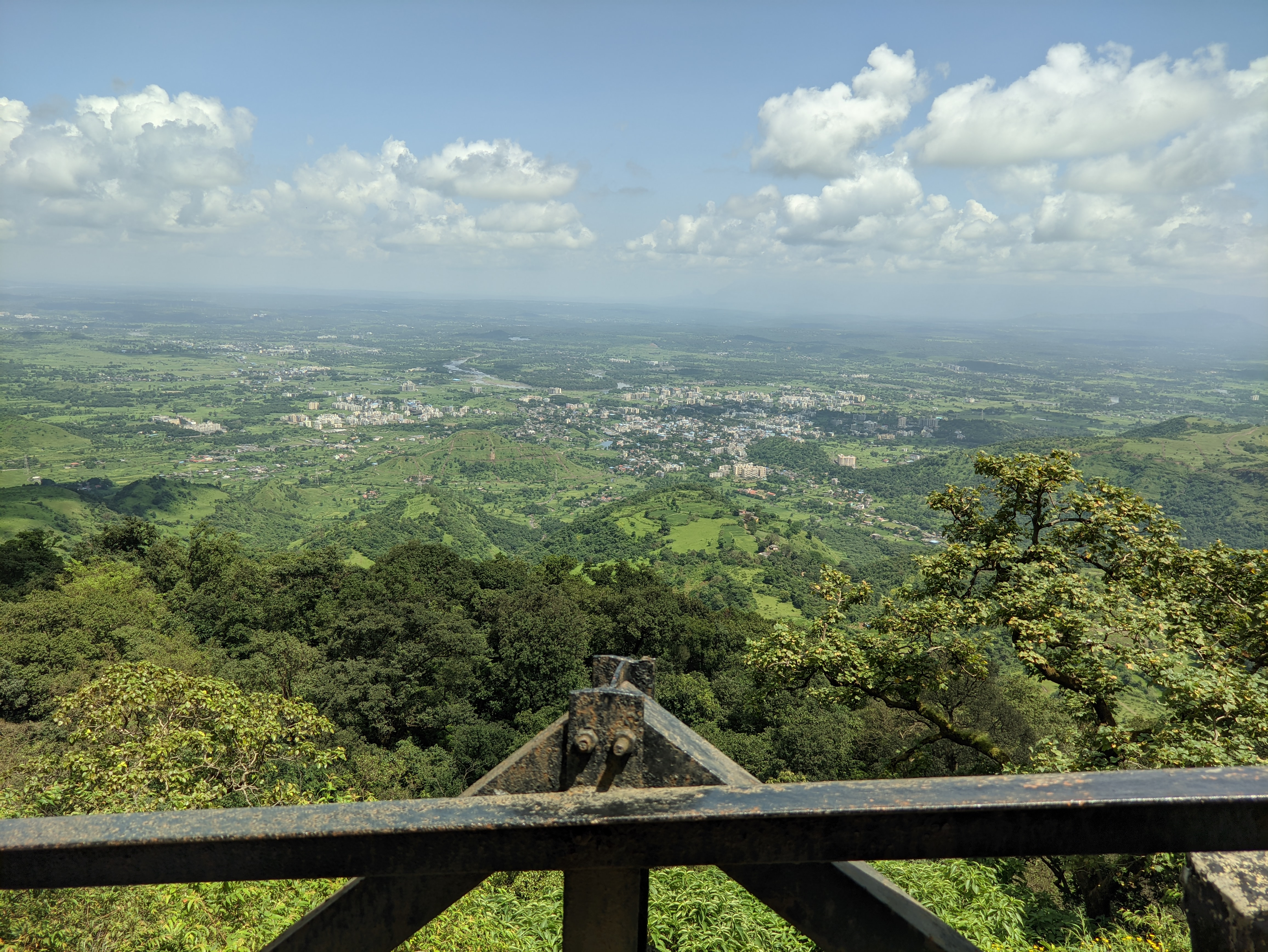
View of Neral
