= Murbad =

- Census town
- Location in Maharashtra, India
- Coordinates: 19.25°N 73.4°E
- Country: India
- State: Maharashtra
- District: Thane

Government
  - Type: Nagar Panchayat (2015), Panchayat Samiti (entire taluka)
- Elevation: 83 m (272 ft)

Population (2011)
  - Total: 15,823

Languages
  - Official: Marathi
- Time zone: UTC+5:30 (IST)
- Postal code: 421401
- Vehicle registration: MH - 05
- Website: Official website

Murbad is a census town within the administrative division (taluka) of Thane district in the Indian state of Maharashtra. Murbad city with its neighbouring villages jointly form the Murbad nagar panchayat, which is near the cities of Thane, Karjat and Kalyan. Nearby cities include Badlapur, Ambernath, Ulhasnagar, and Dombivli. It is a largely industrial town with private and public enterprises (MIDC).

== Geography ==
Murbad is located at 19.25°N 73.4°E with an average elevation of 83 meters (272 feet). In Murbad, there are about 206 villages with a total population of 18,725. The climate of Murbad is mostly present considering the satilite cities around. The nearby Sahyadri mountains cause heavy rainfall in Murbad; in July, the average rainfall is 53.7 inches. The dry season is in January, when the area receives an average rainfall of less than one tenth of an inch. Murbad stays primarily within a 15 degree range, with an average low of 72.7 degrees Fahrenheit (22.6 degrees Celsius) in January and an average high of 86.9 degrees Fahrenheit (30.5 degrees Celsius) in May. March has seen the highest temperature of summer here in Murbad. On 25 March 2019, a temperature of 45.5 °C was recorded. Murbad is surrounded by Shahapur taluka in the north, Ambernath, Kalyan and Ulhasnagar talukas in the west, Ahmednagar district in the northeast, and Pune district in the east. Murbadi, Kalu, and Shai are the major rivers of Murbad. All of them are seasonal and flow westwards. The Barvi Dam is the nearest dam to Murbad, 5 km away along the Shastrinagar - Fansoli road.

== Demographics ==
As of 2001 India census, Murbad had a population of 15,823, consisting of 54% male and 46% females. Murbad has an average literacy rate of 73%; the national average is 59.5%. Literacy rates is 80% among males and 65% among females. Approximately 15% of the population is under 6 years of age.

== Transport ==
- Air - The nearest airport is Chhatrapati Shivaji Maharaj International Airport in Mumbai (about 75 km away). The Navi Mumbai International Airport will open in 2025, keeping Murbad in the proximity of two major airports.
- Rail - The nearest railway stations are at Kalyan, Badlapur and Titwala in the Central Railway zone. A new railway line between Kalyan and Murbad is under survey.
- Road - Murbad lies on the Kalyan to Ahmednagar National Highway (No.222).

== Educational institutions ==
- Government Industrial Training Institute Murbad
- Tilak Scholars Academy Murbad
- New English School, Murbad
- Wisdom English High School, Murbad
- NTTF College
- Subh Ayush School Tondlikar Nagar, Murbad
- Swami Vivekananda English Medium School
- Aadarsh Vidyalaya, Murbad
- Modern English Medium School, Murbad
- Suyash College Of Arts, Commerce And Science, Murbad

== Around Murbad ==
Murbad Taluka is settled in the natural depression of the Sahyadri Hills. It has been developed as a tourist destination. A historical memorial event, "Mhasa Jatra", happens near here annually during which lakhs of people visit Murbad. Mhasa Jatra (Yatra) is held on Paush (10th month of Hindu Marathi calendar) Purnima (Full Moon Day), which is approximately in the month of January every year. The tradition of Mhasa Yatra is more than 200 years old and the presiding deity is Khamblingeshwar, or Mhasoba (Lord Shankar). Devotees come in to offer their prayers to Lord Shankar from different parts of Maharashtra and neighbouring states. Jatra is held over a sprawl of 1.5 to 2 km surrounding the temple in Mhasa village.

Murbad comes under the Konkan Region.

Malshej Ghat is situated in the Thane/Pune district, and is near the borders of Thane and Ahmednagar districts; it has an average height of 700m. Malshej Ghat comes alive in the monsoon season (June–September), when innumerable waterfalls abound in the area. It receives many local hikers, trekkers and adventure-lovers during this period. In the winter season, Malshej Ghat is home to the exotic flamingos who migrate there.

Fort Siddhagad is an ancient hillfort built by the Shilahara royal family in the 9th century AD. The tomb of freedom fighter and martyr Bhai Kotwal lies at the base of this fort's south side. It is the highest hillfort in Maharashtra (with a height of about 910 metres). The central top of this fort is a particularly exciting and tough climb. Visits to the fort are best undertaken in the winter or summer season.
