= Bhivpuri Road railway station =

Railway Station in Maharashtra, India

Bhivpuri Road

General information
- Location: Bhivpuri, Raigad district
- Coordinates: 18°58′12″N 73°19′53″E
- Elevation: 48.750 metres (159.94 ft)
- System: Indian Railways and Mumbai Suburban Railway station
- Owner: Ministry of Railways, Indian Railways
- Line: Central Line
- Platforms: 2

Other information
- Status: Active
- Station code: BVS
- Fare zone: Central Railways

Services
Preceding station	Mumbai Suburban Railway	Following station
Neral Junction towards Chhatrapati Shivaji Terminus	Central line	Karjat towards Khopoli
Route map
Location
- Location within India Location within Maharashtra

Bhivpuri Road railway station (station code: BVS) is a railway station on the Central line of the Mumbai Suburban Railway network in India. It is on the Karjat route. Neral Junction is the previous stop and Karjat is the next stop.

At Bhivpuri, a state highway connects to NH4, Panvel and Navi Mumbai in one direction and to Badlapur and Thane District in the other. A new multi-facilities hospital at Bhivpuri, Raigad Hospital & Research Center, covers the area from Shelu and Neral to Karjat. There is also a waterfall which is popular for day trips.

== Gallery ==
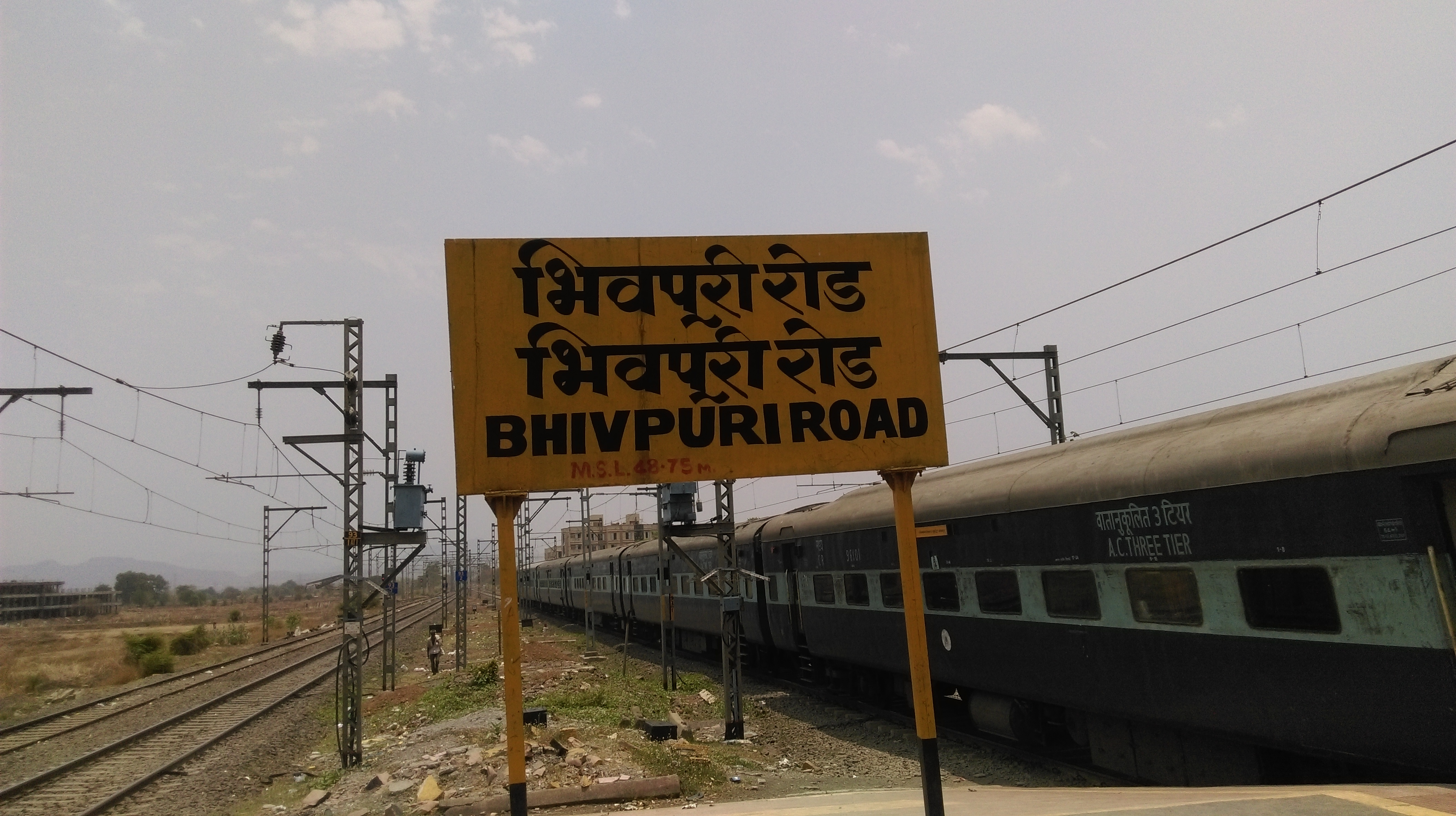
Bhivpuri Road railway station

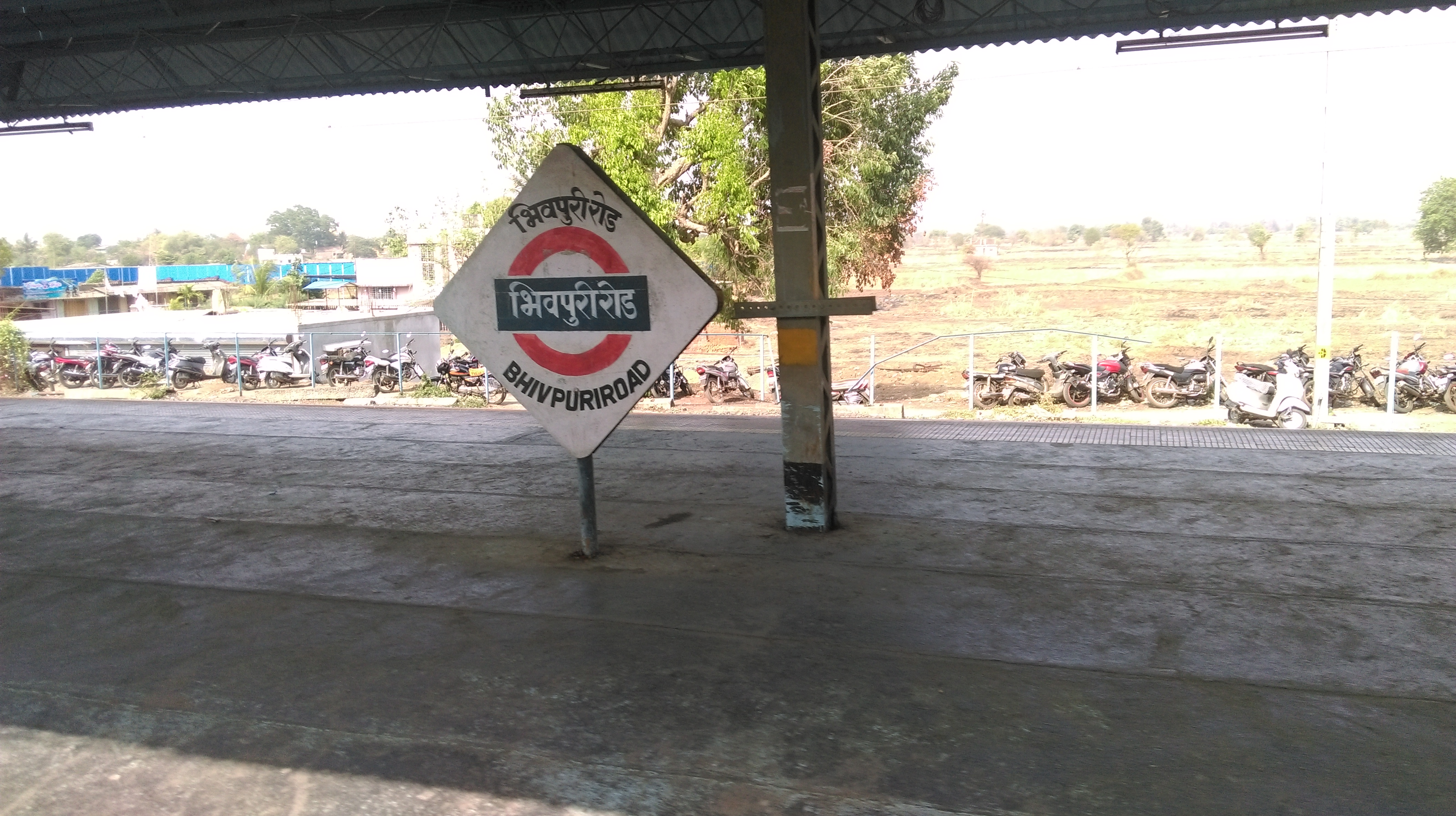
Bhivpuri Road railway station board

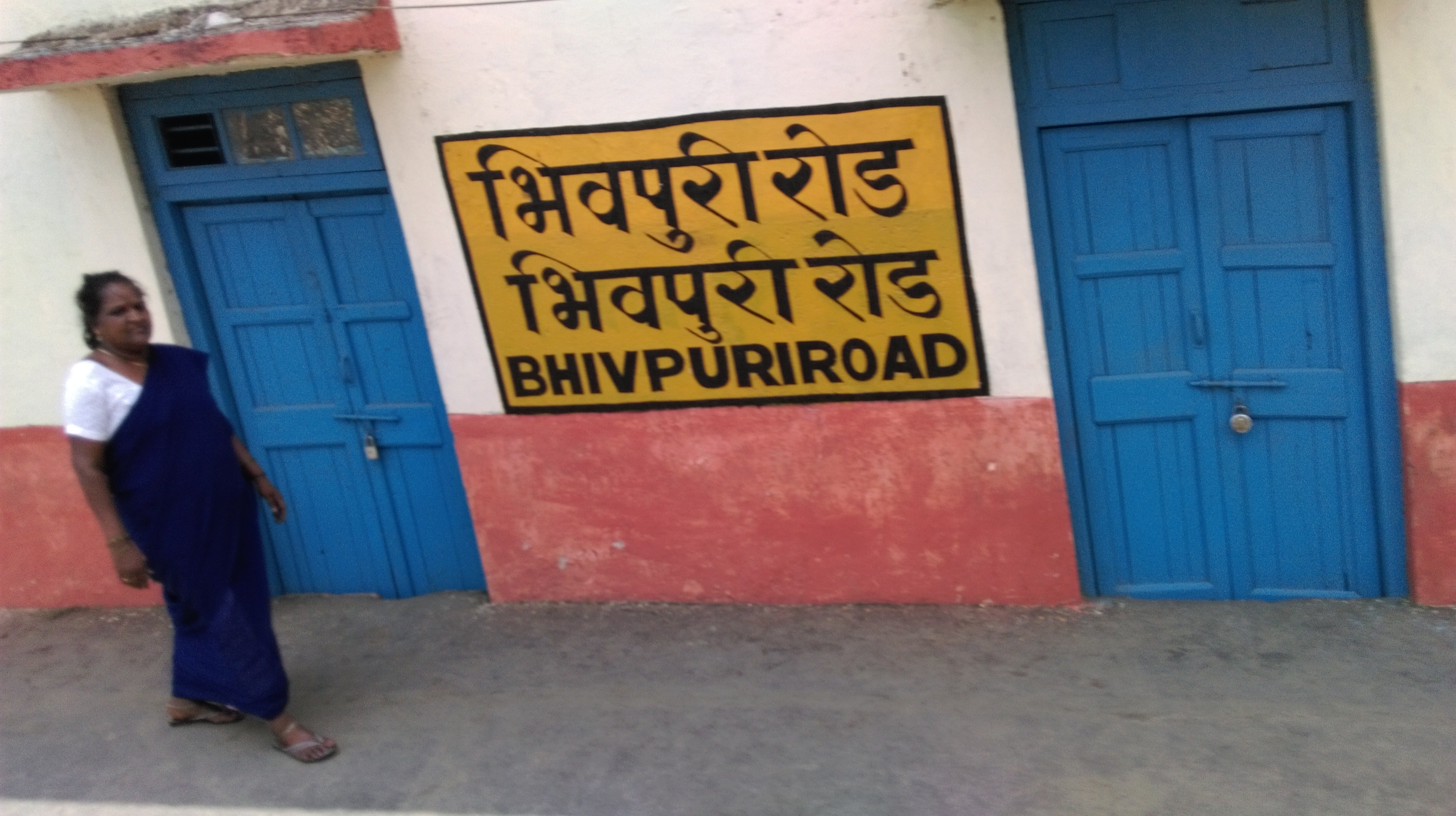
Bhivpuri Road railway station
