= Neral =

Neral may refer to:

- An isomer of Citral
- Neral, India, a town in Raigad district in the Indian state of Maharashtra
  - Neral Junction railway station
- A Romulan from Star Trek
