= Shelu railway station =

Shelu

General information
- Location: Shelu, Raigad district
- Coordinates: 19.06344°N 73.31777°E
- Elevation: 39.500 metres (129.59 ft)
- System: Indian Railways and Mumbai Suburban Railway station
- Owner: Ministry of Railways, Indian Railways
- Line: Central Line
- Platforms: 2

Construction
- Structure type: Standard, on ground

Other information
- Status: Active
- Station code: SHLU
- Fare zone: Central Railways

History
- Opened: 1 May 1984

Services
Preceding station	Mumbai Suburban Railway	Following station
Vangani towards Chhatrapati Shivaji Terminus	Central line	Neral Junction towards Khopoli
Route map
Location
- Location within Maharashtra

Shelu railway station (station code: SHLU) is a railway station on the Central line of the Mumbai Suburban Railway network. The preceding station is Vangani railway station and the following station is Neral Junction railway station.

It is situated in the town of Shelu.

== Gallery ==
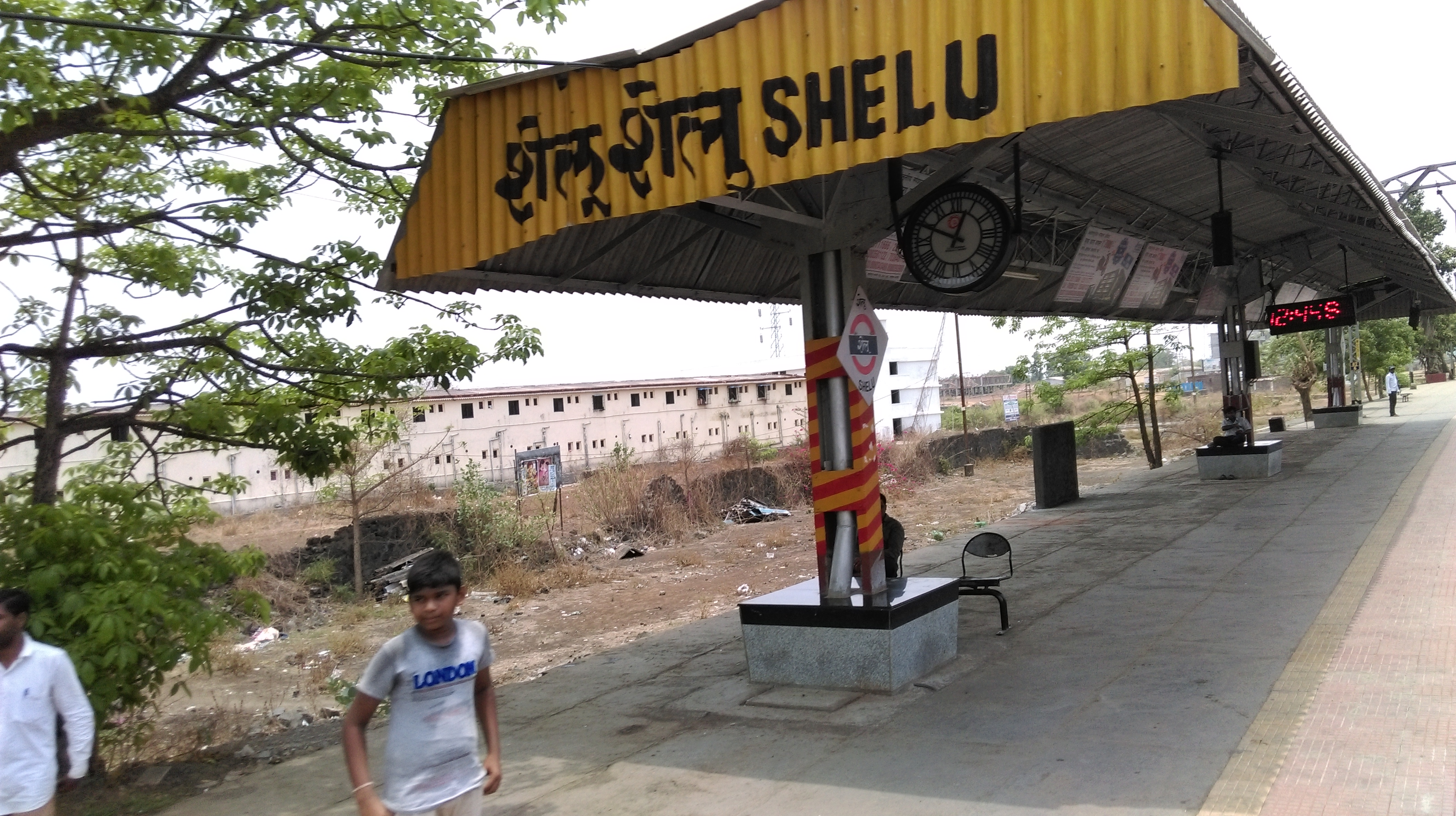
Shelu railway station - Platform

Shelu railway station - Platform board

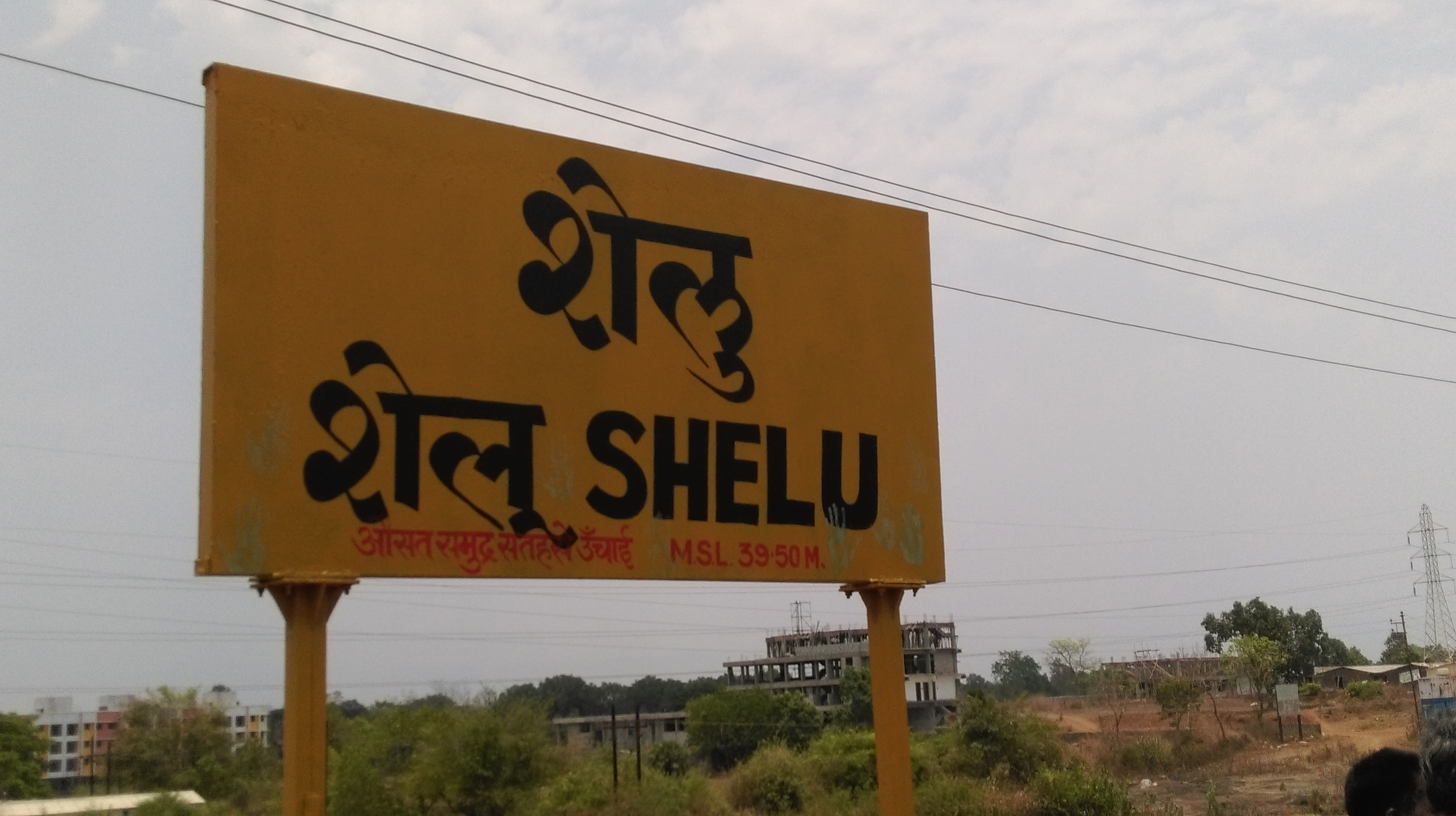
Shelu railway station board
