= Bhivpuri =

- Town
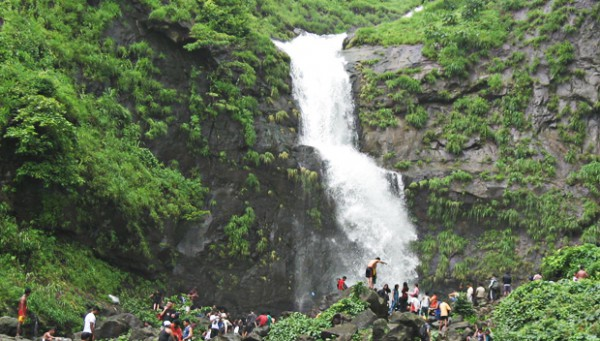
- Bhivpuri Waterfall is adventure place in Karjat.

- Location in Maharashtra, India
- Coordinates: 18°58′12″N 73°19′53″E
- Country: India
- State: Maharashtra
- District: Raigad
- Elevation: 40 m (130 ft)

Population (2011)
  - Total: 21,178

Languages
  - Official: Marathi
- Time zone: UTC+5:30 (IST)
- PIN: 410201
- Telephone code: 02148
- Vehicle registration: MH-06

Bhivpuri is a town in Karjat Taluka near Mumbai. It is the location of Bhivpuri Road railway station of the Mumbai Suburban Railway. A temple of Sai Baba of Shirdi is located here. Numerous nearby waterfalls attract visitors on weekends. Bhivpuri Dam and a hydro-electricity generation plant of Tata Power is located nearby. Neral is the previous stop and Karjat is the next stop. Bhivpuri has state highway which is connecting to NH4, Panvel & Navi Mumbai and the other side connects to Badlapur & Thane District. In Bhivpuri there is one new multi facilities hospital (Raigad Hospital & Research Center) located which covers the area from Shelu, Neral to Karjat.
