= Vangani railway station =

Railway Station in Maharashtra, India

Vangani

General information
- Location: Vangani, Thane district
- Coordinates: 19°5′39″N 73°18′4″E
- Elevation: 39.25 metres (128.8 ft)
- System: Indian Railways and Mumbai Suburban Railway station
- Owner: Ministry of Railways, Indian Railways
- Line: Central Line
- Platforms: 2
- Tracks: 2

Construction
- Structure type: Standard, on ground
- Cycle facilities: No

Other information
- Status: Active
- Station code: VGI
- Fare zone: Central Railways

Services
Preceding station	Mumbai Suburban Railway	Following station
Badlapur towards Chhatrapati Shivaji Terminus	Central line	Shelu towards Khopoli
Route map
Location
- Location within Maharashtra

Vangani (station code: VGI) is a railway station on the Central line of the Mumbai Suburban Railway network. The preceding station is Badlapur railway station and the following station is Shelu railway station.

== Gallery ==
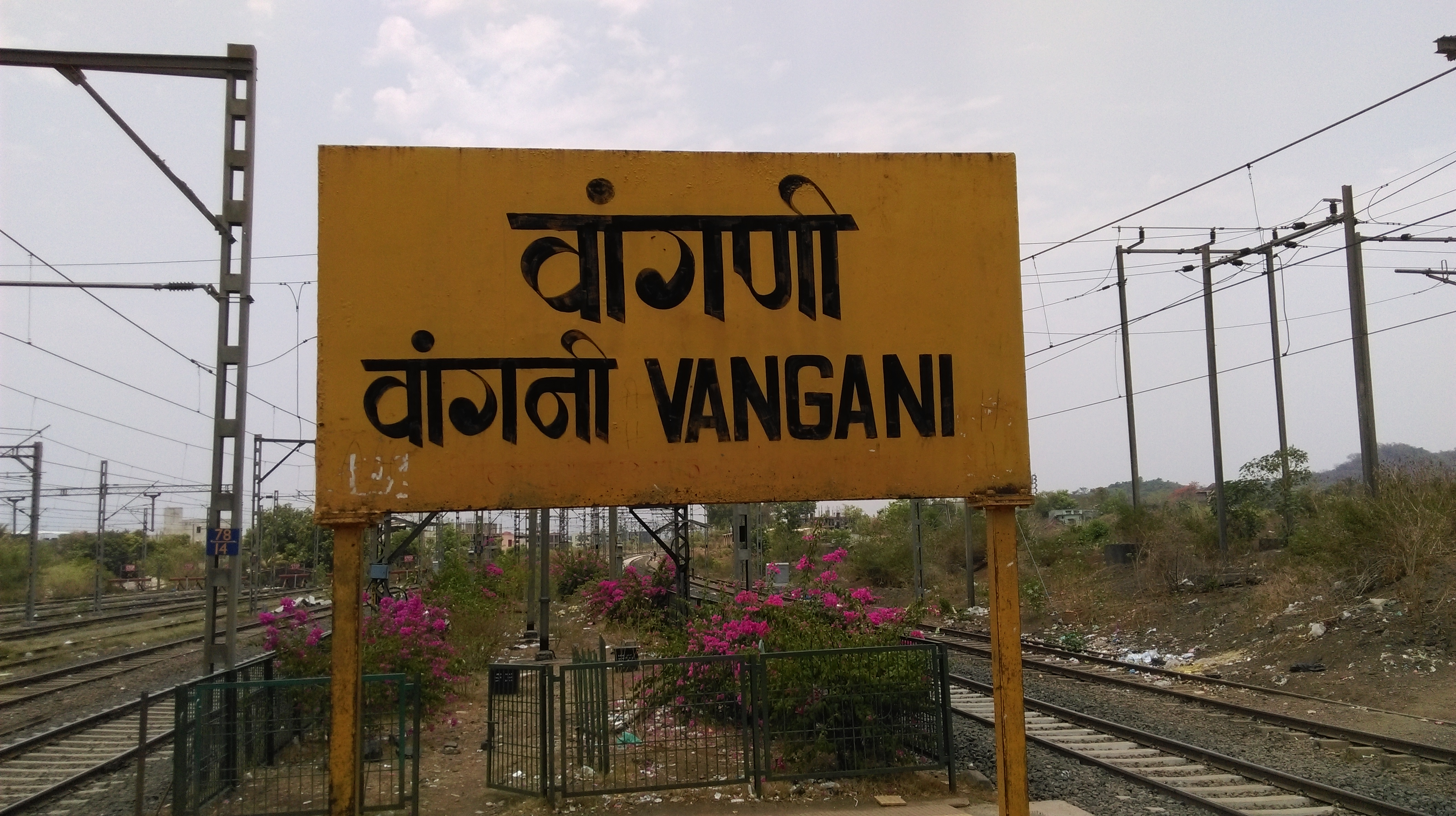
Vangani railway station board
