= Vangani =

- town
- Location in Maharashtra, India
- Coordinates: 19.094628°N 73.3°E
- Country: India
- State: Maharashtra
- District: Thane
- Elevation: 40 m (130 ft)

Languages
  - Official: Marathi
- Time zone: UTC+5:30 (IST)
- PIN: 421503
- Telephone code: 0251
- Vehicle registration: MH-05

Vangani is a town in Maharashtra, India near the city of Mumbai. It is serviced by the Vangani railway station on the Central Line of the Mumbai Suburban Railway on the Mumbai-Karjat route and the MH SH 43 Highway which connects it with the Suburban Mumbai.

Vangani is basically divided into two parts viz. Vangani Gaon which lies on the East side of Vangani Rly. Station and the Market area is on the West. On its east side, near to station. Then waterfall called 'Bhagirath' to the east of the railway station during the monsoons. There is pandav kalin Shankar Temple in Kadav pada. Then in vangani gaon, in jungle area, there is a Goddess WAGHESHWARI DEVI and God Tiger (Waghoba) temple, in it the god Tiger (Waghoba) does not have its head to its body having a history behind it and this Temple is surrounded with greenery.

Vangani is known for plant nursery and masala (powdered spices).
