= Neral Junction railway station =

Railway Station in Maharashtra, India

Neral Junction
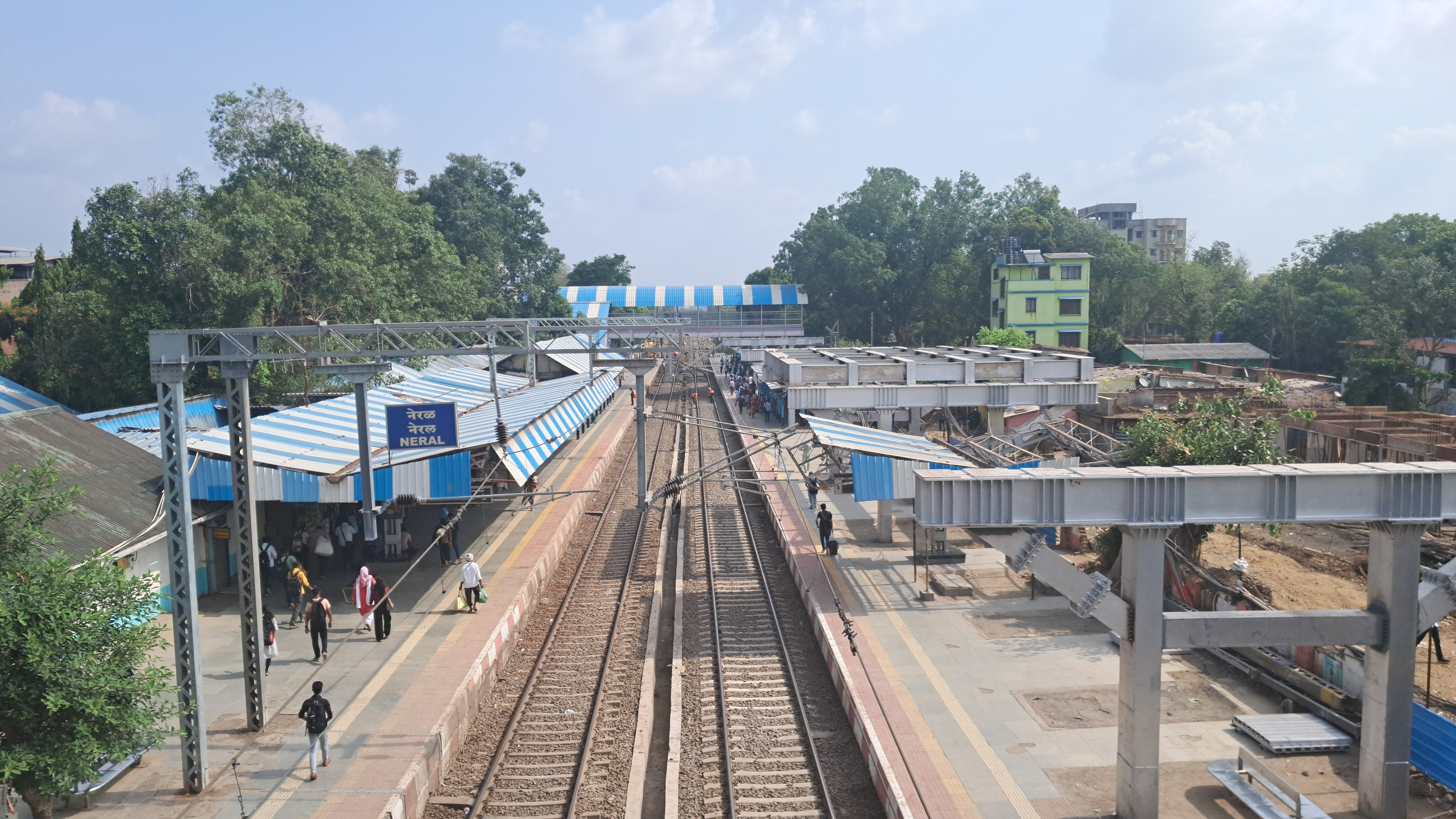
- Neral Junction Railway Station

General information
- Coordinates: 19.02673°N 73.3184°E
- Elevation: 39.310 metres (128.97 ft)
- System: Indian Railways, Mumbai Suburban Railway and Matheran Hill Railway station
- Owner: Ministry of Railways, Indian Railways
- Lines: Central Railway, Matheran Hill Railway

Other information
- Status: Active
- Station code: NRL (Central Railways); NRLN (Central Railways - Narrow Gauge Matheran Line)
- Fare zone: Central Railways

History
- Opened: 12 May 1856

Services
Preceding station	Mumbai Suburban Railway	Following station
Shelu towards Chhatrapati Shivaji Terminus	Central line	Bhivpuri Road towards Khopoli
Route map
Location
- Location within Maharashtra

Neral Junction railway station, also simply Neral Railway Station is a railway station on the Central line of the Mumbai Suburban Railway network located in the town of Neral. It is a major junction on the Kalyan - Karjat section of Central railway connecting Mumbai and Pune, with station code NRL for the primary Central Railways line and station code NRLN for the narrow gauge Matheran Hill Railway line.

It is the starting point of the Matheran Hill Railway connecting to the hill station of Matheran. The trains on this line are also referred to as the Matheran Toy Train due to their smaller size and narrow gauge track.

== History ==
The South-East mainline of the GIPR spanning from Callian (Kalyan) to Palasdhari was opened to traffic on 12 May 1856, along with three stations, viz. Badlapur, Neral, Khopoli. The second line was opened in March 1868.

== Gallery ==
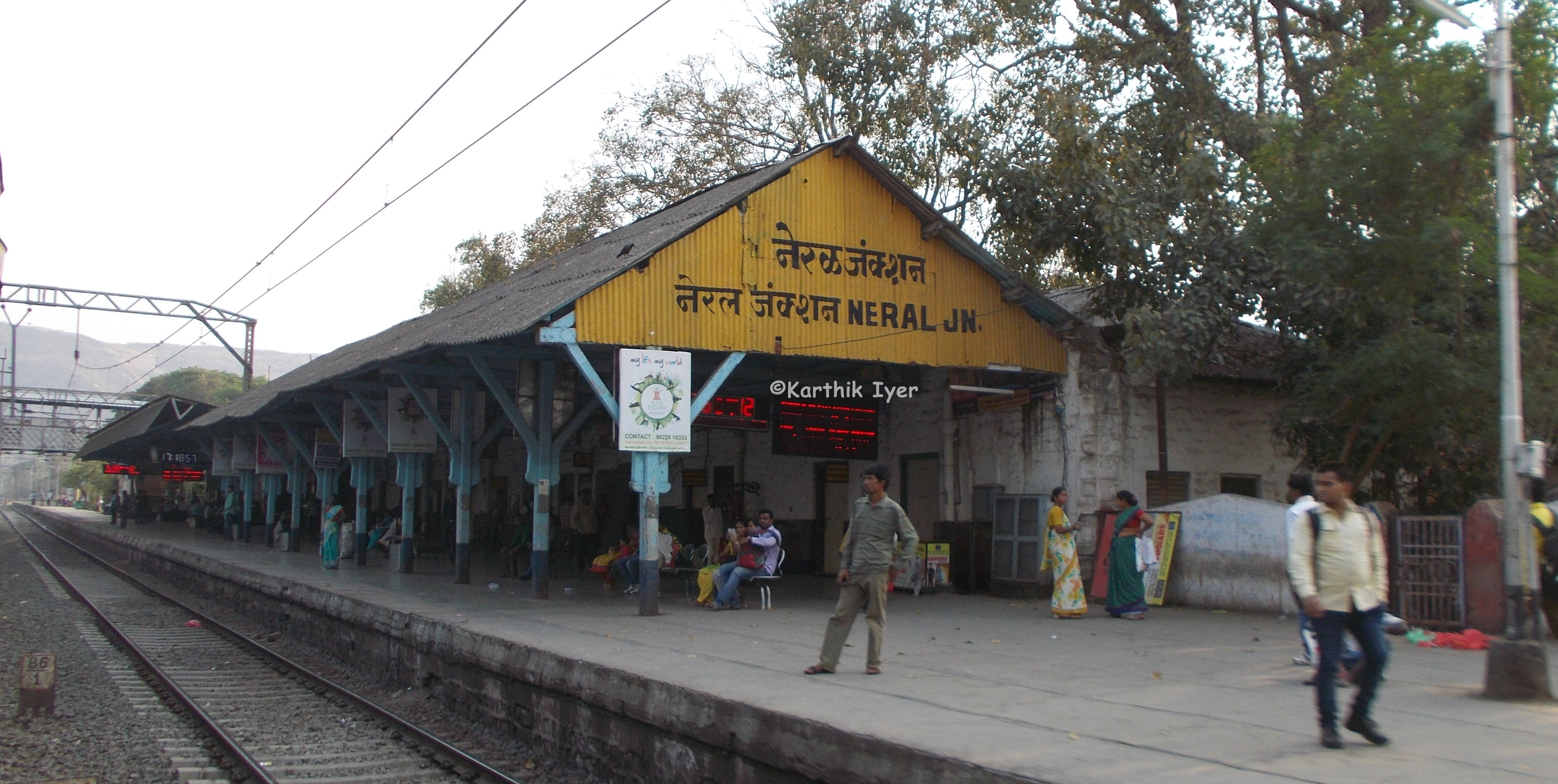
View of Neral Junction Railway Station

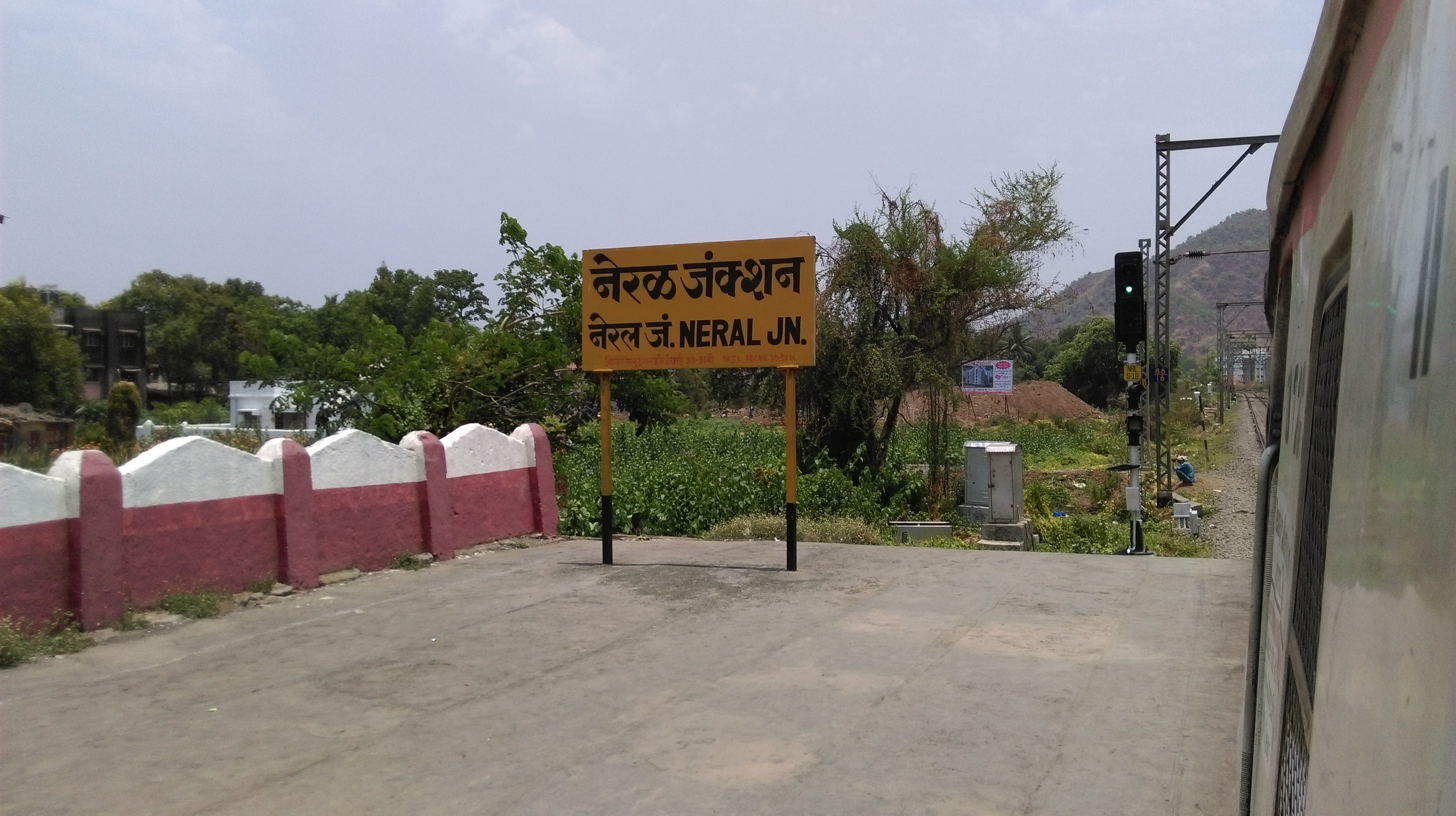
Neral railway station - Station board

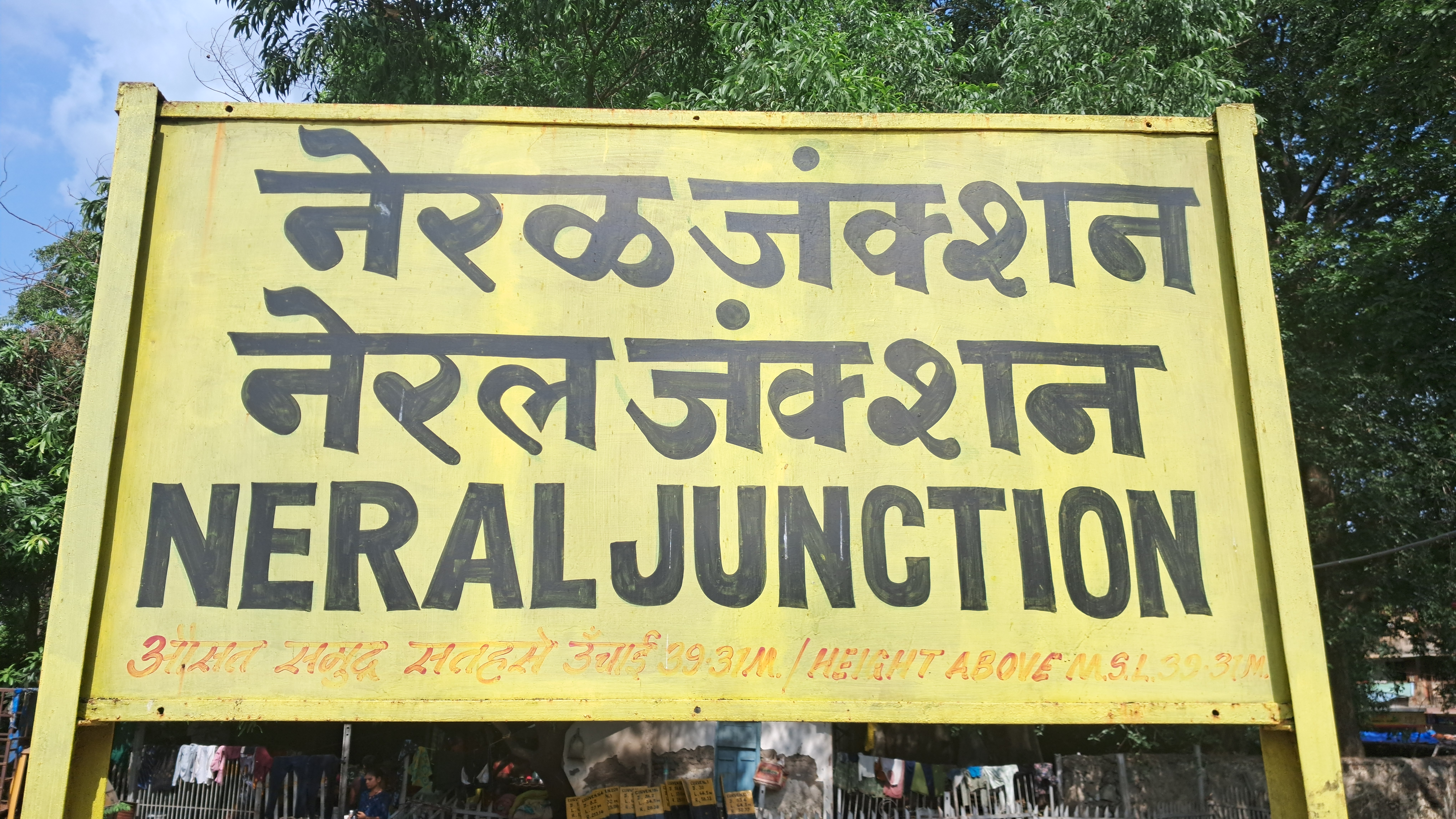
Platform board at Toy Train Station

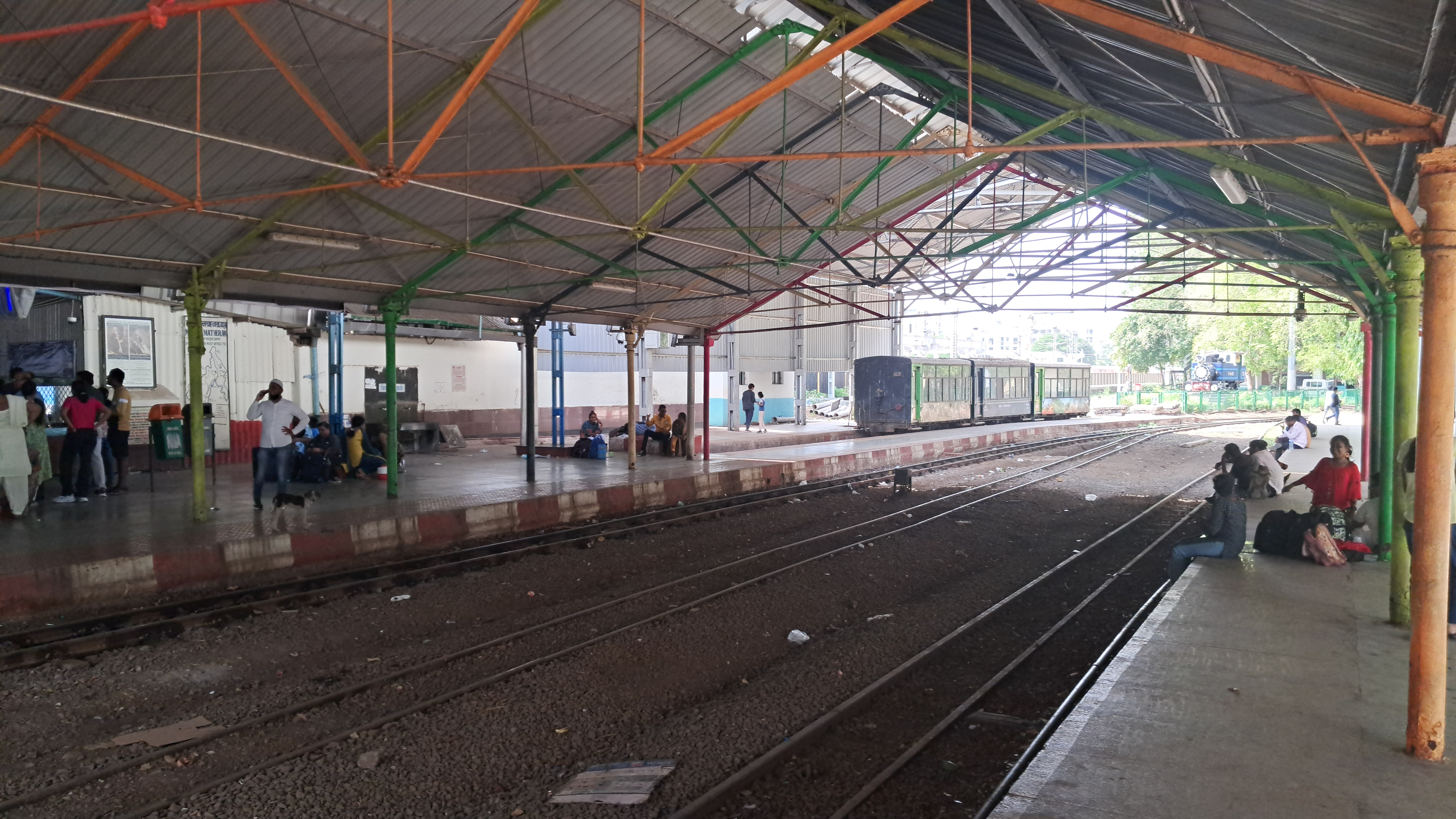
Inside View of Neral Toy Train Station.

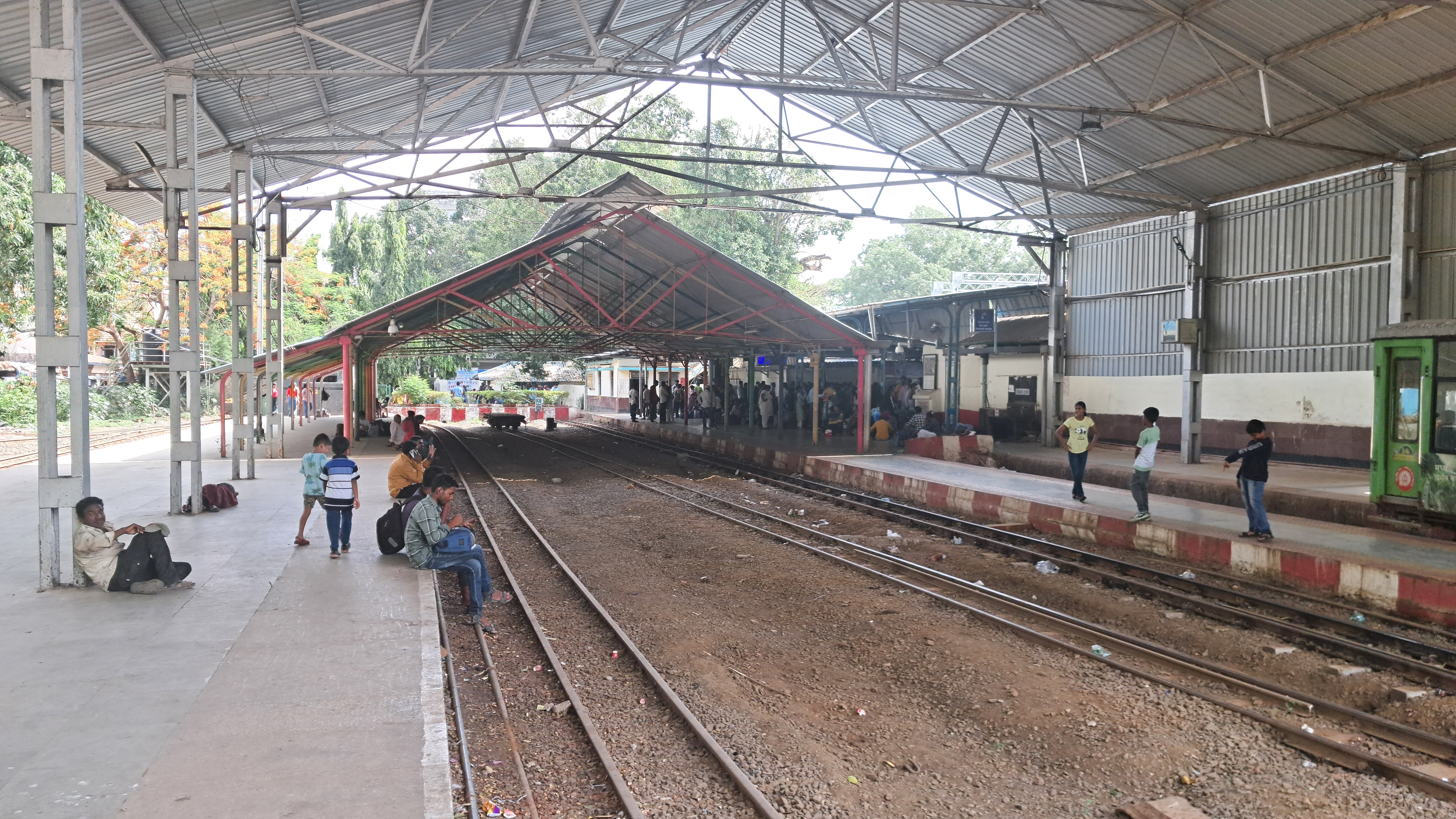
Inside View of Neral Toy Train Station.

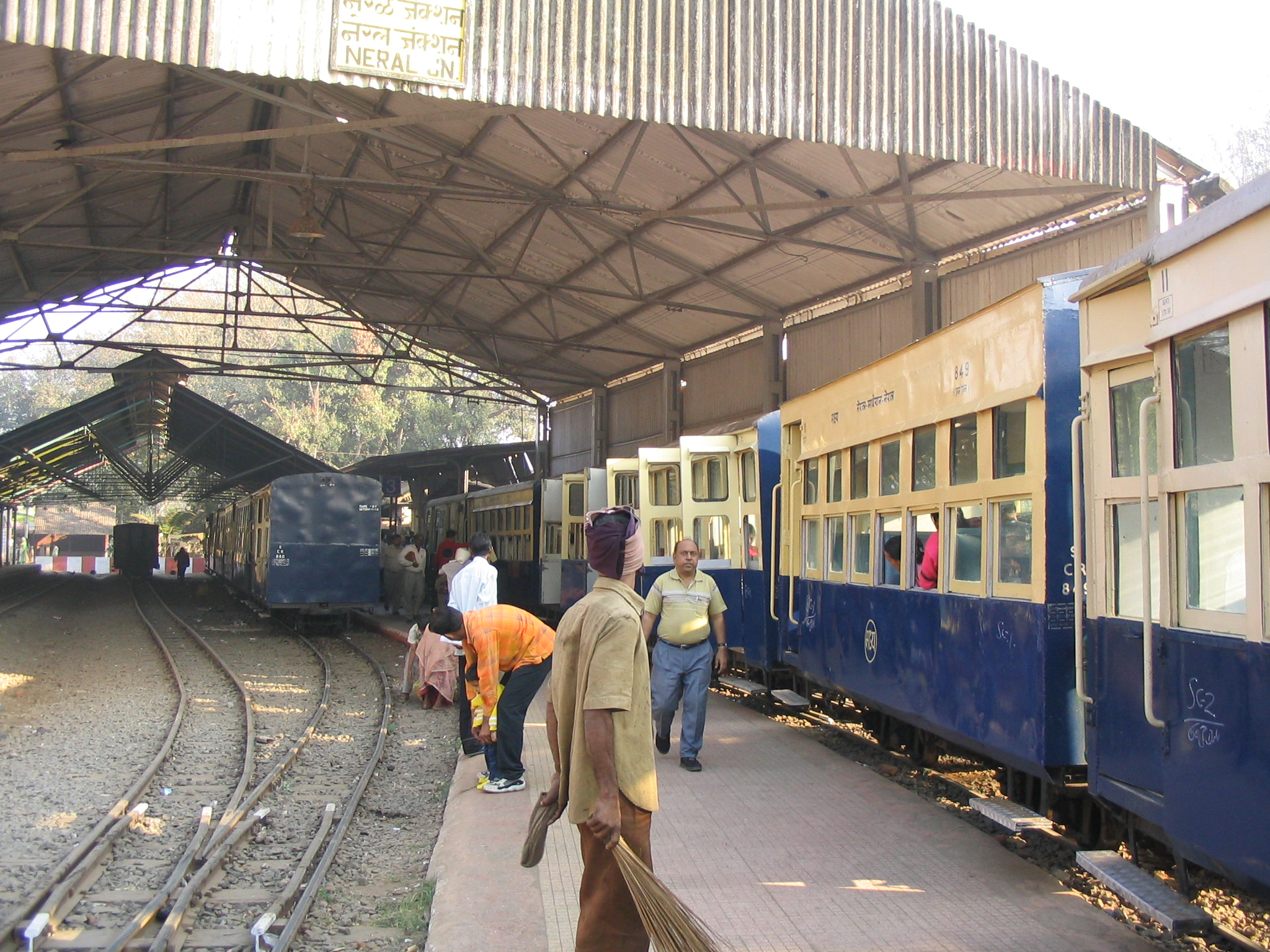
View of MHR Narrow gauge station

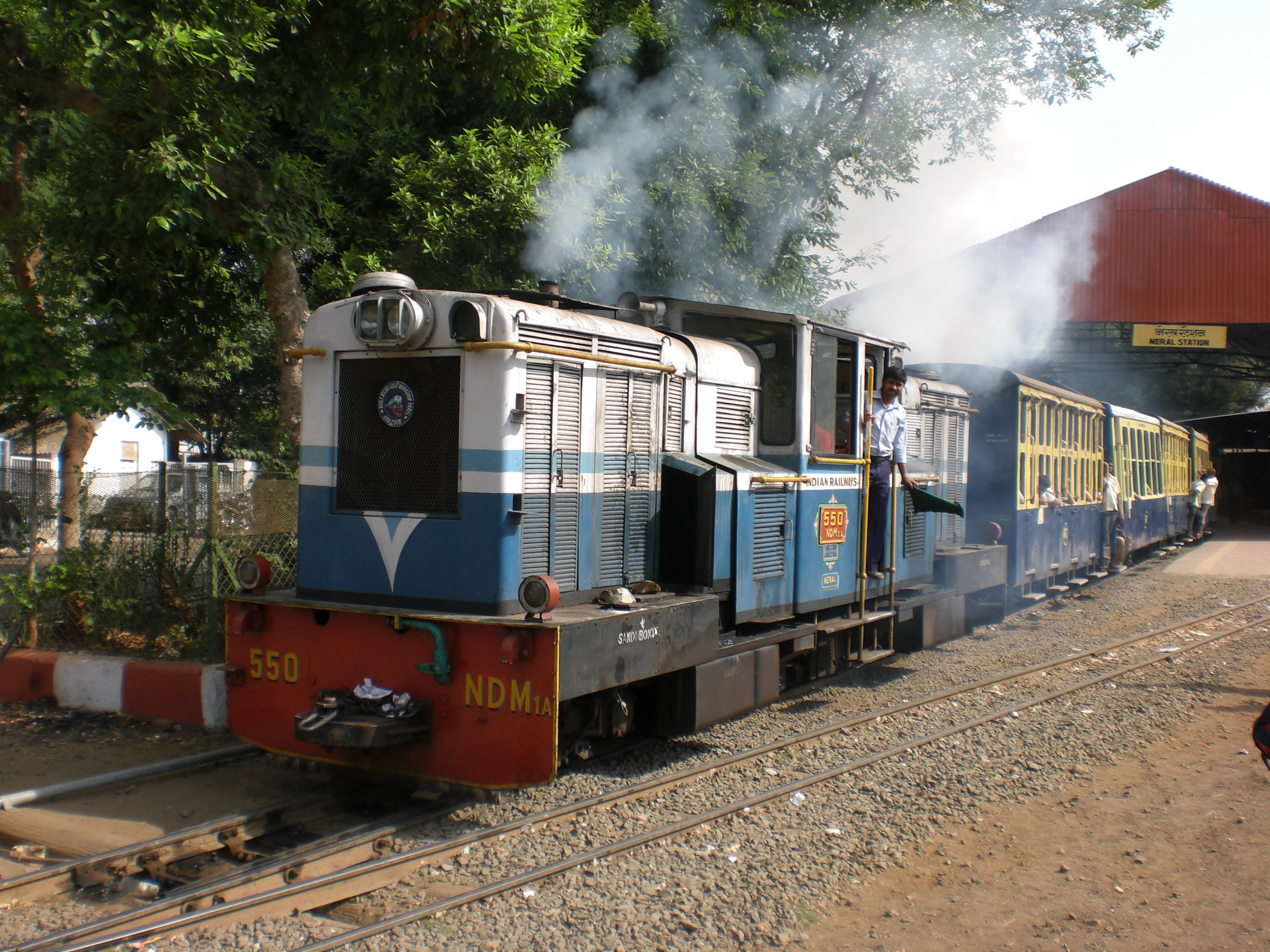
Train departing from Neral Station

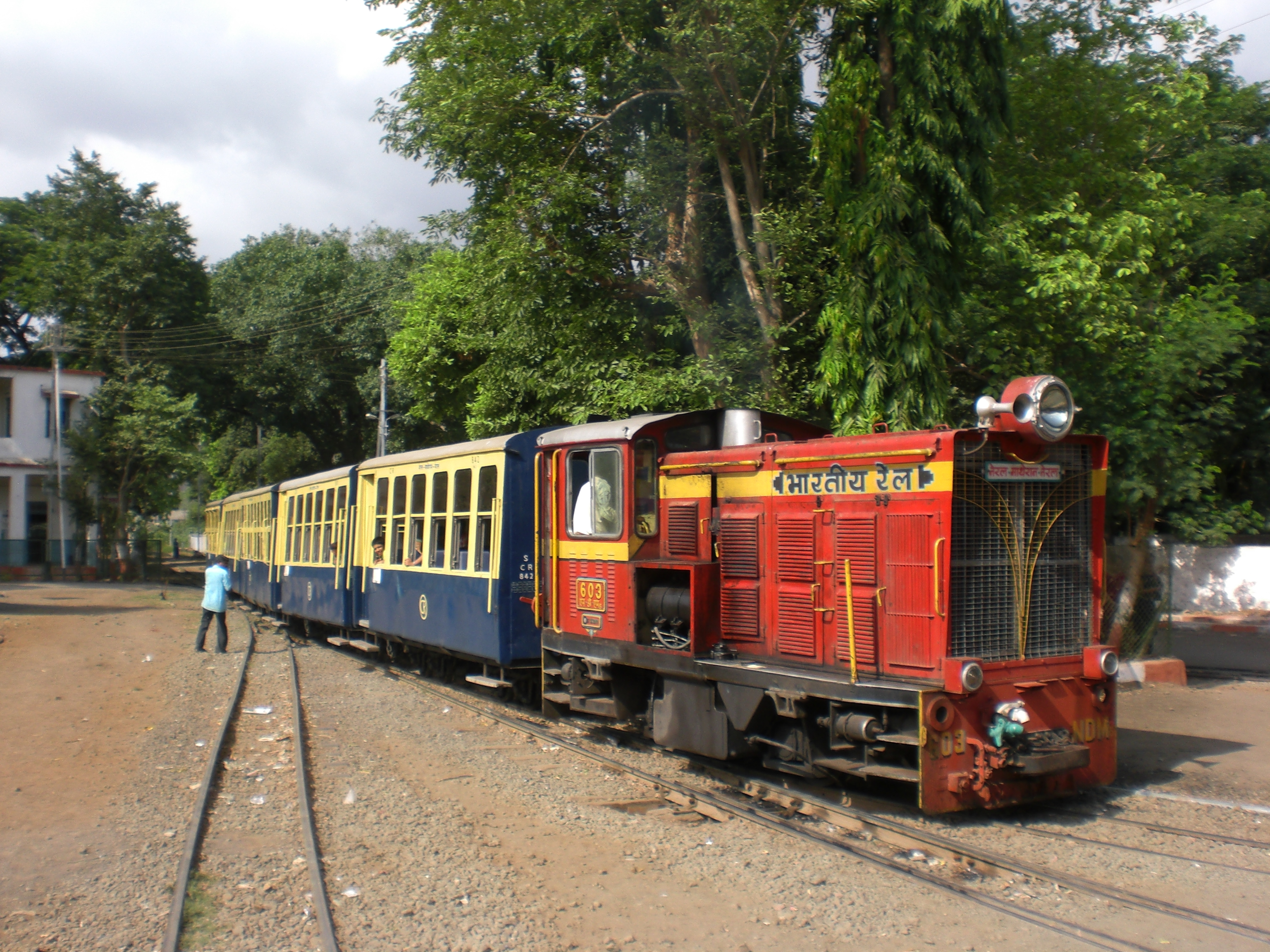
Train arriving at Neral MHR station

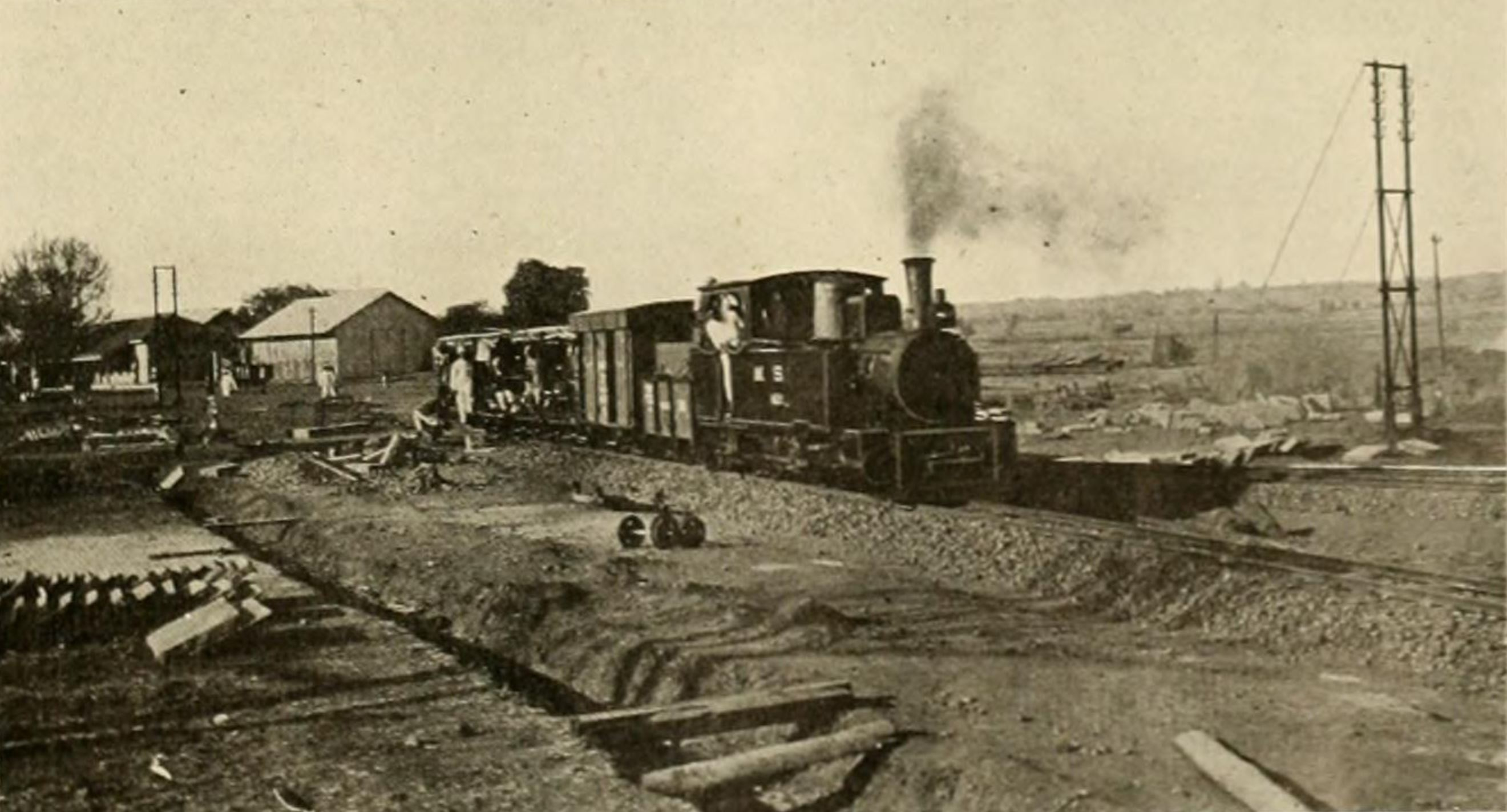
A Train departing Neral station: Sometime between 1904 and 1907

== See also ==
- Matheran Hill Railway
- Matheran Railway Station
