= Shelu =

Shelu (Karjat) Bandiwali
- Town
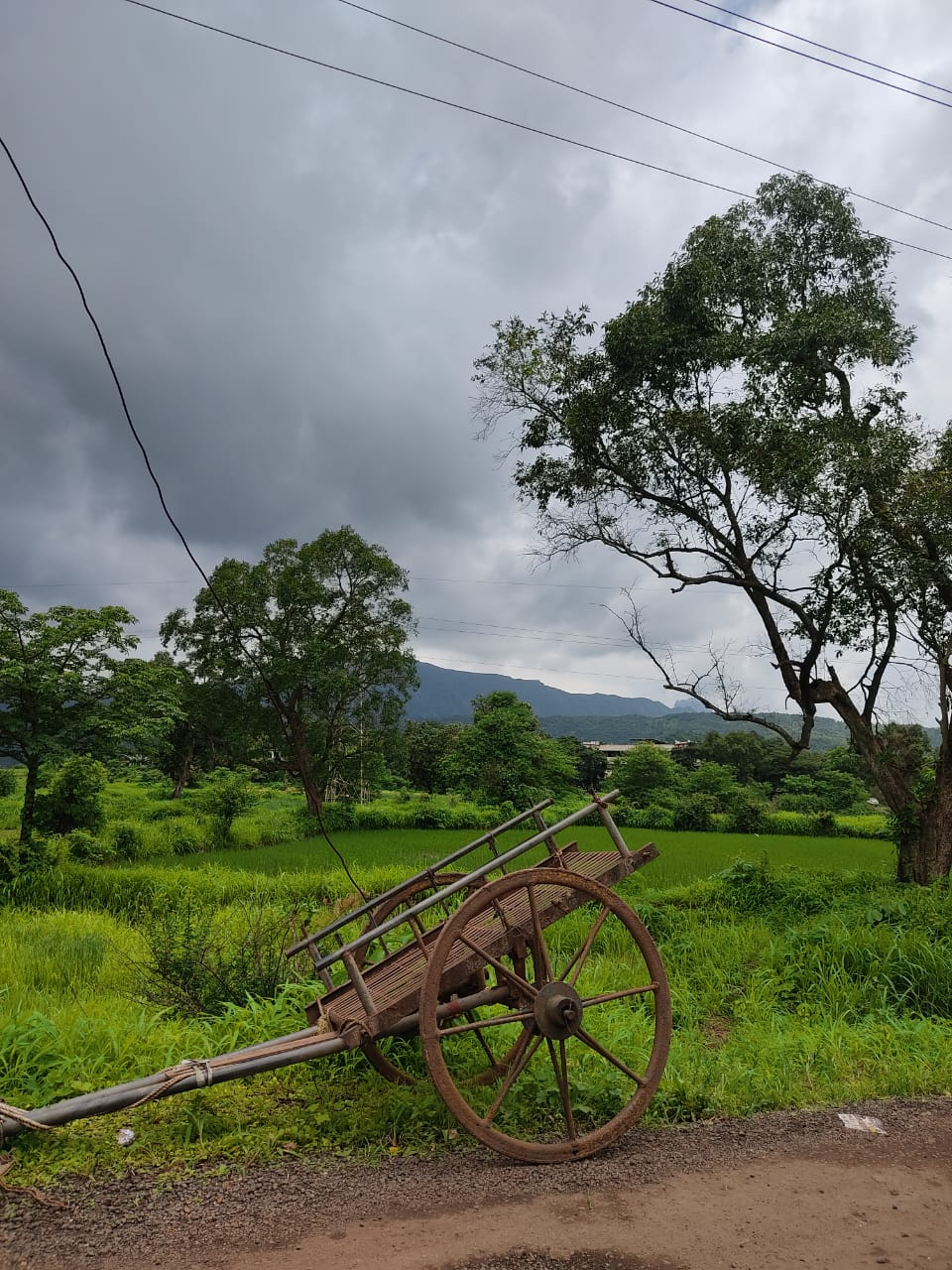
- A farm in Shelu near GV Acharcya Institute

- Location in Maharashtra, India
- Coordinates: 19.0659°N 73.3199°E
- Country: India
- State: Maharashtra
- District: Raigad
- Taluka: Karjat

Government
  - Type: Gram Panchayat
  - Body: Group Gram Panchayat Shelu
  - Sarpanch: Shivaji Babu Kharik
  - Up-Sarpanch: -
  - Secretary: Vilas Nemaji Kamble
  - Talathi Saja: -
- Elevation: 40 m (130 ft)

Languages
  - Official: Marathi
- Time zone: UTC+5:30 (IST)
- PIN: 410101
- Telephone code: 02148
- Vehicle registration: MH-46

Shelu is a town in Karjat Tehsil, Maharashtra, India. It also has a station on the Mumbai Suburban Railway in Raigad district. The station is on the Mumbai - Karjat route after Vangani. Shelu Local Language is Marathi. Shelu Village Total population is 1374 and number of houses are 286. Female Population is 48.7%. Village literacy rate is 71.4% and the Female Literacy rate is 31.7%. The famous Ulhas River passed through this town and it is a source of fresh water for this area. In the western side of the shelu town Matheran Mountains are there and on the easter side of the Shelu town Ulhas River passes through. The Shelu town has India Post's Branch Post office its PIN Code is 410101.

== Climate ==
In the Shelu town the rainy season starts in the month of June and it last till October month. The Shelu town is heavy rain area. The winter season starts from the month of November and it last till the month of February. The average temperature during winter is 14-15 degree Celsius. The hot season starts from March to May. During the summer season the average temperature remains 30-35 degree Celsius.

== Shelu Railway Station ==
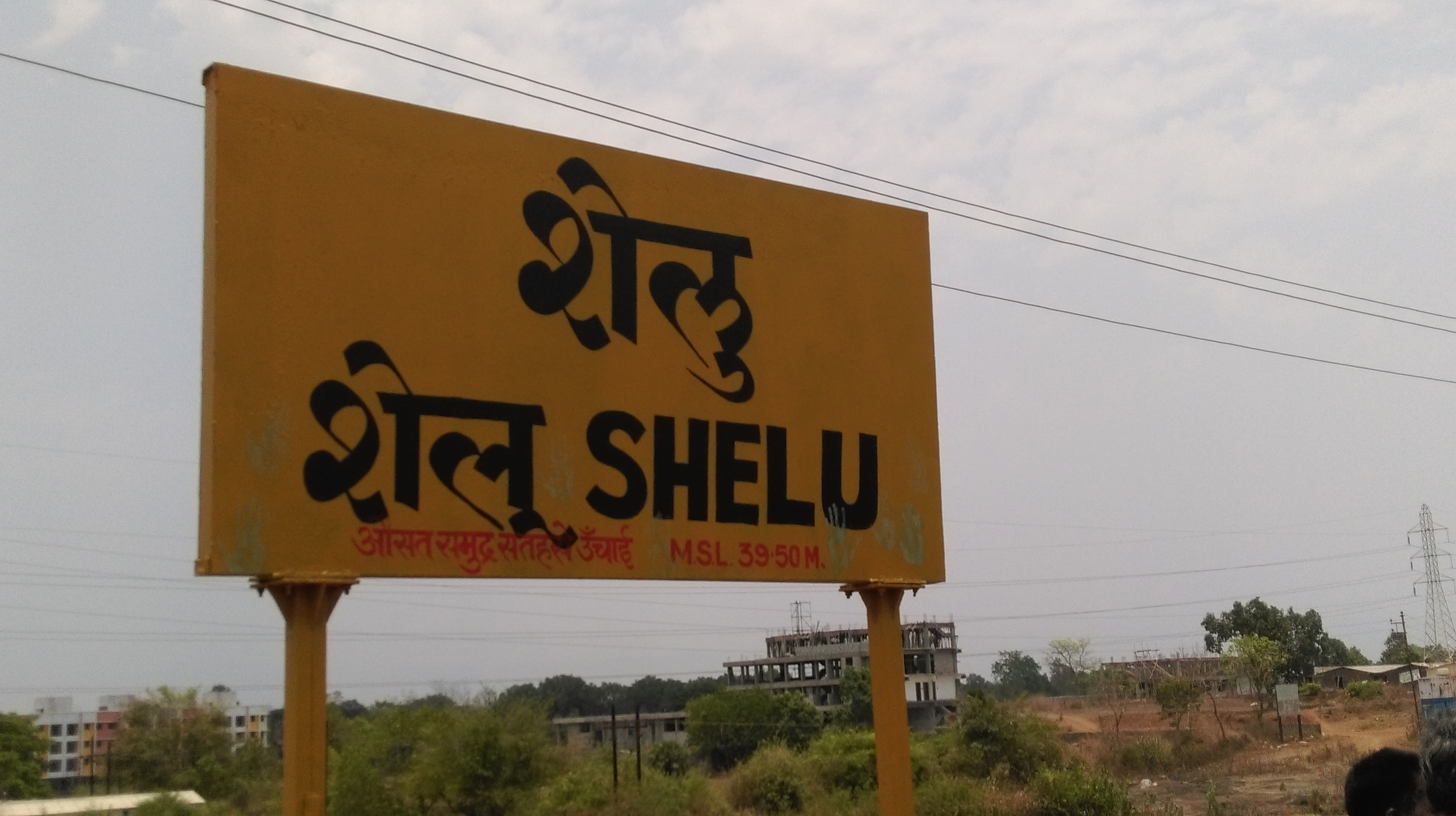

Shelu town has a railway station in its name SHELU RAILWAY STATION". On this railway station daily 35 local trains stops which goes towards Mumbai and daily 35 local trains stops which goes towards karjat. This railway station has good rail connectivity with Mumbai & Thane city.

== Road connectivity ==
Badlapur - Karjat Highway passed through Shelu Town. The Karjat - Murbad State Highway 79 also accessible from Shelu town.

== Tourism ==
The Shelu town is full of greenery nature and has fresh air quality. This place is also 4 kilometers away from Neral - Matheran which is famous tourist destination. Hence, many holiday resorts are available in Shelu town as well which attracts the tourists specially from Mumbai City.

== Educational institutes ==
Many education institutes are having their presence in Shelu. Some of them are:

1) The G.V. Acharya Institute of Engineering & Technology College. 2) The G.V. Acharya Polytechnic College 3) SAV Acharya Institute of Management Studies 4) Namrata Acharya School 5) Omkar Vidyalay (Bandhiwali) 6) RZP School Bandhivali (Government School) 7) ZP School Shelu (Government School) 8) St. Aura E-Techno School

== Chitrapatjanak Dada Saheb Phalke Township, Shelu ==
A township is being built in Shelu town which is close to Vangani, where Father of Indian cinema Dadasaheb Phalke shot his first film Raja Harishchandra.10,080 (522 1BHK homes in Phase 1) houses will be allocated to first time home buyers. The flats are being built under Pradhan Mantri Awas Yojna. The construction of phase 1 is expected to be completed by 2024.

== Temples ==
The Shelu town have many temples in region. Some of them are:

1) Sai Mandir 2) Sani Dev Mandir 3) Vitthal Mandir 4) Amba Mata Math, Shelu 5) Aai Bhawani Mandir, Shelu 6) Swami Samarth Sadhaka Ashram 7) Kolamba Mata Mandir.
