= Shelti =

Village in Maharashtra

- village
- Location in Maharashtra, India Shelti (India)
- Coordinates: 19.9161976°N 72.8456399°E
- Country: India
- State: Maharashtra
- District: Palghar
- Taluka: Dahanu
- Elevation: 48 m (157 ft)

Population (2011)
  - Total: 154
- Time zone: UTC+5:30 (IST)
- 2011 census code: 551688

Shelti is a village in the Palghar district of Maharashtra, India. It is located in the Dahanu taluka.

== Demographics ==
According to the 2011 census of India, Shelti has 42 households. The effective literacy rate (i.e. the literacy rate of population excluding children aged 6 and below) is 43.75%.

Demographics (2011 Census)
	Total	Male	Female
Population	154	74	80
Children aged below 6 years	26	14	12
Scheduled caste	0	0	0
Scheduled tribe	148	72	76
Literates	56	32	24
Workers (all)	86	43	43
Main workers (total)	34	23	11
Main workers: Cultivators	13	10	3
Main workers: Agricultural labourers	9	7	2
Main workers: Household industry workers	0	0	0
Main workers: Other	12	6	6
Marginal workers (total)	52	20	32
Marginal workers: Cultivators	12	7	5
Marginal workers: Agricultural labourers	34	9	25
Marginal workers: Household industry workers	0	0	0
Marginal workers: Others	6	4	2
Non-workers	68	31	37
