= Komgaon =

Village in Maharashtra

- village
- Location in Maharashtra, India Komgaon (India)
- Coordinates: 20.0817935°N 72.8604097°E
- Country: India
- State: Maharashtra
- District: Palghar
- Taluka: Dahanu
- Elevation: 38 m (125 ft)

Population (2011)
  - Total: 2,134
- Time zone: UTC+5:30 (IST)
- ISO 3166 code: IN-MH
- 2011 census code: 551619

Komgaon is a village in the Palghar district of Maharashtra, India. It is located in the Dahanu taluka.

== Demographics ==
According to the 2011 census of India, Komgaon has 374 households. The effective literacy rate (i.e. the literacy rate of population excluding children aged 6 and below) is 32.29%.

Demographics (2011 Census)
	Total	Male	Female
Population	2,134	1,048	1,086
Children aged below 6 years	465	237	228
Scheduled caste	0	0	0
Scheduled tribe	2,132	1,048	1,084
Literates	539	336	203
Workers (all)	927	538	389
Main workers (total)	368	328	40
Main workers: Cultivators	267	248	19
Main workers: Agricultural labourers	36	28	8
Main workers: Household industry workers	0	0	0
Main workers: Other	65	52	13
Marginal workers (total)	559	210	349
Marginal workers: Cultivators	290	83	207
Marginal workers: Agricultural labourers	131	27	104
Marginal workers: Household industry workers	1	0	1
Marginal workers: Others	137	100	37
Non-workers	1,207	510	697
