= Ambesari =

Village in Maharashtra

- village
- Location in Maharashtra, India Ambesari (India)
- Coordinates: 20.016°N 72.856°E
- Country: India
- State: Maharashtra
- District: Palghar
- Taluka: Dahanu
- Elevation: 95 m (312 ft)

Population (2011)
  - Total: 5,690
- Time zone: UTC+5:30 (IST)
- 2011 census code: 551594

Ambesari is a village in the Palghar district of Maharashtra, India. It is located in the Dahanu taluka.

== Demographics ==
According to the 2011 census of India, Ambesari has 1062 households. The effective literacy rate (i.e. the literacy rate of population excluding children aged 6 and below) is 44.11%.

Demographics (2011 Census)
	Total	Male	Female
Population	5690	2735	2955
Children aged below 6 years	1058	525	533
Scheduled caste	0	0	0
Scheduled tribe	5659	2714	2945
Literates	2043	1222	821
Workers (all)	2742	1335	1407
Main workers (total)	2479	1255	1224
Main workers: Cultivators	1024	501	523
Main workers: Agricultural labourers	1145	534	611
Main workers: Household industry workers	7	5	2
Main workers: Other	303	215	88
Marginal workers (total)	263	80	183
Marginal workers: Cultivators	42	19	23
Marginal workers: Agricultural labourers	173	40	133
Marginal workers: Household industry workers	3	0	3
Marginal workers: Others	45	21	24
Non-workers	2948	1400	1548
