= Raipada =

Village in Maharashtra

- village
- Location in Maharashtra, India Raipada (India)
- Coordinates: 19.9969301°N 72.7599575°E
- Country: India
- State: Maharashtra
- District: Palghar
- Taluka: Dahanu
- Elevation: 18 m (59 ft)

Population (2011)
  - Total: 1,964
- Time zone: UTC+5:30 (IST)
- ISO 3166 code: IN-MH
- 2011 census code: 551601

Raipada is a village in the Palghar district of Maharashtra, India. It is located in the Dahanu taluka.

== Demographics ==
According to the 2011 census of India, Raipada has 422 households. The effective literacy rate (i.e. the literacy rate of population excluding children aged 6 and below) is 77.98%.

Demographics (2011 Census)
| | Total | Male | Female |
|---|---|---|---|
| Population | 1964 | 982 | 982 |
| Children aged below 6 years | 225 | 117 | 108 |
| Scheduled caste | 4 | 2 | 2 |
| Scheduled tribe | 625 | 311 | 314 |
| Literates | 1356 | 719 | 637 |
| Workers (all) | 763 | 513 | 250 |
| Main workers (total) | 701 | 479 | 222 |
| Main workers: Cultivators | 59 | 53 | 6 |
| Main workers: Agricultural labourers | 157 | 110 | 47 |
| Main workers: Household industry workers | 10 | 5 | 5 |
| Main workers: Other | 475 | 311 | 164 |
| Marginal workers (total) | 62 | 34 | 28 |
| Marginal workers: Cultivators | 12 | 8 | 4 |
| Marginal workers: Agricultural labourers | 11 | 7 | 4 |
| Marginal workers: Household industry workers | 1 | 0 | 1 |
| Marginal workers: Others | 38 | 19 | 19 |
| Non-workers | 1201 | 469 | 732 |
