= Dapchari =

Village in Maharashtra

- village
- Location in Maharashtra, India Dapchari (India)
- Coordinates: 20.0729624°N 72.9165266°E
- Country: India
- State: Maharashtra
- District: Palghar
- Taluka: Dahanu
- Elevation: 60 m (200 ft)

Population (2011)
  - Total: 3,645
- Time zone: UTC+5:30 (IST)
- 2011 census code: 551621

Dapchari is a village in the Palghar district of Maharashtra, India. It is located in the Dahanu taluka.

== Demographics ==
According to the 2011 census of India, Dapchari has 753 households. The effective literacy rate (i.e. the literacy rate of population excluding children aged 6 and below) is 57.06%.

Demographics (2011 Census)
	Total	Male	Female
Population	3645	1805	1840
Children aged below 6 years	606	326	280
Scheduled caste	75	39	36
Scheduled tribe	2772	1353	1419
Literates	1734	1010	724
Workers (all)	1436	957	479
Main workers (total)	1160	776	384
Main workers: Cultivators	237	185	52
Main workers: Agricultural labourers	472	312	160
Main workers: Household industry workers	133	30	103
Main workers: Other	318	249	69
Marginal workers (total)	276	181	95
Marginal workers: Cultivators	20	15	5
Marginal workers: Agricultural labourers	83	60	23
Marginal workers: Household industry workers	22	7	15
Marginal workers: Others	151	99	52
Non-workers	2209	848	1361
