= Vasantwadi =

Village in Maharashtra

- village
- Location in Maharashtra, India Vasantwadi (India)
- Coordinates: 19.9670913°N 72.8072342°E
- Country: India
- State: Maharashtra
- District: Palghar
- Taluka: Dahanu
- Elevation: 25 m (82 ft)

Population (2011)
  - Total: 2,009
- Time zone: UTC+5:30 (IST)
- 2011 census code: 551605

Vasantwadi is a village in the Palghar district of Maharashtra, India. It is located in the Dahanu taluka.

== Demographics ==
According to the 2011 census of India, Vasantwadi has 396 households. The effective literacy rate (i.e. the literacy rate of population excluding children aged 6 and below) is 41.15%.

Demographics (2011 Census)
	Total	Male	Female
Population	2009	966	1043
Children aged below 6 years	371	178	193
Scheduled caste	0	0	0
Scheduled tribe	1916	915	1001
Literates	674	426	248
Workers (all)	965	553	412
Main workers (total)	562	394	168
Main workers: Cultivators	60	27	33
Main workers: Agricultural labourers	295	228	67
Main workers: Household industry workers	10	4	6
Main workers: Other	197	135	62
Marginal workers (total)	403	159	244
Marginal workers: Cultivators	97	23	74
Marginal workers: Agricultural labourers	149	35	114
Marginal workers: Household industry workers	3	2	1
Marginal workers: Others	154	99	55
Non-workers	1044	413	631
