= Zarali =

Village in Maharashtra

- village
- Location in Maharashtra, India Zarali (India)
- Coordinates: 20.030882°N 72.7540473°E
- Country: India
- State: Maharashtra
- District: Palghar
- Taluka: Dahanu
- Elevation: 21 m (69 ft)

Population (2011)
  - Total: 1,338
- Time zone: UTC+5:30 (IST)
- 2011 census code: 551592

Zarali is a village in the Palghar district of Maharashtra, India. It is located in the Dahanu taluka.

== Demographics ==
According to the 2011 census of India, Zarali has 257 households. The effective literacy rate (i.e. the literacy rate of population excluding children aged 6 and below) is 59.57%.

Demographics (2011 Census)
	Total	Male	Female
Population	1338	668	670
Children aged below 6 years	225	111	114
Scheduled caste	0	0	0
Scheduled tribe	1319	658	661
Literates	663	403	260
Workers (all)	717	370	347
Main workers (total)	550	338	212
Main workers: Cultivators	32	14	18
Main workers: Agricultural labourers	347	199	148
Main workers: Household industry workers	15	6	9
Main workers: Other	156	119	37
Marginal workers (total)	167	32	135
Marginal workers: Cultivators	3	1	2
Marginal workers: Agricultural labourers	138	21	117
Marginal workers: Household industry workers	1	0	1
Marginal workers: Others	25	10	15
Non-workers	621	298	323
