= Bramhanwadi =

Village in Maharashtra

- village
- Location in Maharashtra, India Bramhanwadi (India)
- Coordinates: 20.0517519°N 72.8914233°E
- Country: India
- State: Maharashtra
- District: Palghar
- Taluka: Dahanu
- Elevation: 74 m (243 ft)

Population (2011)
  - Total: 871
- Time zone: UTC+5:30 (IST)
- ISO 3166 code: IN-MH
- 2011 census code: 551642

Bramhanwadi is a village in the Palghar district of Maharashtra, India. It is located in the Dahanu taluka.

== Demographics ==
According to the 2011 census of India, Bramhanwadi has 158 households. The effective literacy rate (i.e. the literacy rate of population excluding children aged 6 and below) is 43.71%.

Demographics (2011 Census)
	Total	Male	Female
Population	871	430	441
Children aged below 6 years	164	72	92
Scheduled caste	0	0	0
Scheduled tribe	855	423	432
Literates	309	206	103
Workers (all)	489	237	252
Main workers (total)	165	159	6
Main workers: Cultivators	149	145	4
Main workers: Agricultural labourers	11	10	1
Main workers: Household industry workers	1	1	0
Main workers: Other	4	3	1
Marginal workers (total)	324	78	246
Marginal workers: Cultivators	9	1	8
Marginal workers: Agricultural labourers	312	77	235
Marginal workers: Household industry workers	2	0	2
Marginal workers: Others	1	0	1
Non-workers	382	193	189
