= Bodgaon =

Village in Maharashtra

- village
- Location in Maharashtra, India Bodgaon (India)
- Coordinates: 20.0269546°N 72.8737017°E
- Country: India
- State: Maharashtra
- District: Palghar
- Taluka: Dahanu
- Elevation: 63 m (207 ft)

Population (2011)
  - Total: 495
- Time zone: UTC+5:30 (IST)
- ISO 3166 code: IN-MH
- 2011 census code: 551647

Bodgaon is a village in the Palghar district of Maharashtra, India. It is located in the Dahanu taluka.

== Demographics ==
According to the 2011 census of India, Bodgaon has 104 households. The effective literacy rate (i.e. the literacy rate of population excluding children aged 6 and below) is 39.82%.

Demographics (2011 Census)
	Total	Male	Female
Population	495	262	233
Children aged below 6 years	38	22	16
Scheduled caste	0	0	0
Scheduled tribe	441	220	221
Literates	182	122	60
Workers (all)	350	184	166
Main workers (total)	337	179	158
Main workers: Cultivators	262	133	129
Main workers: Agricultural labourers	65	40	25
Main workers: Household industry workers	4	3	1
Main workers: Other	6	3	3
Marginal workers (total)	13	5	8
Marginal workers: Cultivators	6	1	5
Marginal workers: Agricultural labourers	2	0	2
Marginal workers: Household industry workers	0	0	0
Marginal workers: Others	5	4	1
Non-workers	145	78	67
