= Bapugaon =

Village in Maharashtra

- village
- Location in Maharashtra, India Bapugaon (India)
- Coordinates: 19.9632909°N 73.0021534°E
- Country: India
- State: Maharashtra
- District: Palghar
- Taluka: Dahanu
- Elevation: 77 m (253 ft)

Population (2011)
  - Total: 1,780
- Time zone: UTC+5:30 (IST)
- 2011 census code: 551666

Bapugaon is a village in the Palghar district of Maharashtra, India. It is located in the Dahanu taluka.

== Demographics ==
According to the 2011 census of India, Bapugaon has 272 households. The effective literacy rate (i.e. the literacy rate of population excluding children aged 6 and below) is 57.32%.

Demographics (2011 Census)
	Total	Male	Female
Population	1780	912	868
Children aged below 6 years	257	123	134
Scheduled caste	4	1	3
Scheduled tribe	1751	896	855
Literates	873	526	347
Workers (all)	780	393	387
Main workers (total)	616	375	241
Main workers: Cultivators	275	217	58
Main workers: Agricultural labourers	263	118	145
Main workers: Household industry workers	2	1	1
Main workers: Other	76	39	37
Marginal workers (total)	164	18	146
Marginal workers: Cultivators	133	6	127
Marginal workers: Agricultural labourers	10	4	6
Marginal workers: Household industry workers	2	1	1
Marginal workers: Others	19	7	12
Non-workers	1000	519	481

== Education ==
The village has a school named Balakan-Ji-Bari-Ashram School. Many students from nearby villages come to this school for completing their schooling. The school is from 1st to 10th standard.
