= Rankol =

Village in Maharashtra

- village
- Location in Maharashtra, India Rankol (India)
- Coordinates: 19.8975034°N 72.8604097°E
- Country: India
- State: Maharashtra
- District: Palghar
- Taluka: Dahanu
- Elevation: 52 m (171 ft)

Population (2011)
  - Total: 2,917
- Time zone: UTC+5:30 (IST)
- 2011 census code: 551700

Rankol is a village in the Palghar district of Maharashtra, India. It is located in the Dahanu taluka.

== Demographics ==
According to the 2011 census of India, Rankol has 559 households. The effective literacy rate (i.e. the literacy rate of population excluding children aged 6 and below) is 53.5%.

Demographics (2011 Census)
	Total	Male	Female
Population	2917	1436	1481
Children aged below 6 years	390	187	203
Scheduled caste	0	0	0
Scheduled tribe	2508	1214	1294
Literates	1352	805	547
Workers (all)	1223	577	646
Main workers (total)	929	438	491
Main workers: Cultivators	388	183	205
Main workers: Agricultural labourers	381	167	214
Main workers: Household industry workers	5	3	2
Main workers: Other	155	85	70
Marginal workers (total)	294	139	155
Marginal workers: Cultivators	59	31	28
Marginal workers: Agricultural labourers	39	14	25
Marginal workers: Household industry workers	182	90	92
Marginal workers: Others	14	4	10
Non-workers	1694	859	835
