= Tanashi, Dahanu =

Village in Maharashtra

Tanashi
- village
- Location in Maharashtra, India Tanashi (India)
- Coordinates: 19.8983569°N 72.6949373°E
- Country: India
- State: Maharashtra
- District: Palghar
- Taluka: Dahanu
- Elevation: 12 m (39 ft)

Population (2011)
  - Total: 1,053
- Time zone: UTC+5:30 (IST)
- 2011 census code: 551728

Tanashi is a village in the Palghar district of Maharashtra, India. It is located in the Dahanu taluka.

== Demographics ==
According to the 2011 census of India, Tanashi has 255 households. The effective literacy rate (i.e. the literacy rate of population excluding children aged 6 and below) is 84.81%.

Demographics (2011 Census)
	Total	Male	Female
Population	1053	522	531
Children aged below 6 years	105	57	48
Scheduled caste	0	0	0
Scheduled tribe	369	184	185
Literates	804	420	384
Workers (all)	497	331	166
Main workers (total)	359	249	110
Main workers: Cultivators	64	56	8
Main workers: Agricultural labourers	185	107	78
Main workers: Household industry workers	2	2	0
Main workers: Other	108	84	24
Marginal workers (total)	138	82	56
Marginal workers: Cultivators	36	20	16
Marginal workers: Agricultural labourers	46	24	22
Marginal workers: Household industry workers	2	1	1
Marginal workers: Others	54	37	17
Non-workers	556	191	365
