= Vasgaon =

Village in Maharashtra

- village
- Location in Maharashtra, India Vasgaon (India)
- Coordinates: 19.9209682°N 72.7052826°E
- Country: India
- State: Maharashtra
- District: Palghar
- Taluka: Dahanu
- Elevation: 15 m (49 ft)

Population (2011)
  - Total: 2,115
- Time zone: UTC+5:30 (IST)
- 2011 census code: 551724

Vasgaon is a village in the Palghar district of Maharashtra, India. It is located in the Dahanu taluka.

== Demographics ==
According to the 2011 census of India, Vasgaon has 437 households. The effective literacy rate (i.e. the literacy rate of population excluding children aged 6 and below) is 81.35%.

Demographics (2011 Census)
	Total	Male	Female
Population	2115	1056	1059
Children aged below 6 years	222	114	108
Scheduled caste	0	0	0
Scheduled tribe	33	16	17
Literates	1540	844	696
Workers (all)	1100	665	435
Main workers (total)	1042	646	396
Main workers: Cultivators	582	412	170
Main workers: Agricultural labourers	363	157	206
Main workers: Household industry workers	43	43	0
Main workers: Other	54	34	20
Marginal workers (total)	58	19	39
Marginal workers: Cultivators	14	2	12
Marginal workers: Agricultural labourers	20	1	19
Marginal workers: Household industry workers	12	9	3
Marginal workers: Others	12	7	5
Non-workers	1015	391	624
