= Sakhare =

Village in Maharashtra

- village
- Location in Maharashtra, India Sakhare (India)
- Coordinates: 19.8167044°N 73.1688878°E
- Country: India
- State: Maharashtra
- District: Palghar
- Taluka: Dahanu
- Elevation: 128 m (420 ft)

Population (2011)
  - Total: 3,354
- Time zone: UTC+5:30 (IST)
- ISO 3166 code: IN-MH
- 2011 census code: 551734

Sakhare is a village in the Palghar district of Maharashtra, India. It is located in the Dahanu taluka.

== Demographics ==
According to the 2011 census of India, Sakhare has 578 households. The effective literacy rate (i.e. the literacy rate of population excluding children aged 6 and below) is 52.12%.

Demographics (2011 Census)
	Total	Male	Female
Population	3354	1701	1653
Children aged below 6 years	520	289	231
Scheduled caste	2	2	0
Scheduled tribe	3170	1607	1563
Literates	1477	878	599
Workers (all)	1698	827	871
Main workers (total)	1489	721	768
Main workers: Cultivators	625	301	324
Main workers: Agricultural labourers	762	365	397
Main workers: Household industry workers	22	10	12
Main workers: Other	80	45	35
Marginal workers (total)	209	106	103
Marginal workers: Cultivators	144	69	75
Marginal workers: Agricultural labourers	42	24	18
Marginal workers: Household industry workers	5	2	3
Marginal workers: Others	18	11	7
Non-workers	1656	874	782
