= Bandhghar =

Village in Maharashtra

- village
- Location in Maharashtra, India Bandhghar (India)
- Coordinates: 19.9938404°N 73.0198654°E
- Country: India
- State: Maharashtra
- District: Palghar
- Taluka: Dahanu
- Elevation: 118 m (387 ft)

Population (2011)
  - Total: 1,103
- Time zone: UTC+5:30 (IST)
- 2011 census code: 551662

Bandhghar is a village in the Palghar district of Maharashtra, India. It is located in the Dahanu taluka.

== Demographics ==
According to the 2011 census of India, Bandhghar has 255 households. The effective literacy rate (i.e. the literacy rate of population excluding children aged 6 and below) is 57.24%.

Demographics (2011 Census)
	Total	Male	Female
Population	1103	518	585
Children aged below 6 years	177	82	95
Scheduled caste	0	0	0
Scheduled tribe	1063	498	565
Literates	530	319	211
Workers (all)	717	323	394
Main workers (total)	447	230	217
Main workers: Cultivators	369	179	190
Main workers: Agricultural labourers	42	20	22
Main workers: Household industry workers	2	2	0
Main workers: Other	34	29	5
Marginal workers (total)	270	93	177
Marginal workers: Cultivators	19	9	10
Marginal workers: Agricultural labourers	247	83	164
Marginal workers: Household industry workers	0	0	0
Marginal workers: Others	4	1	3
Non-workers	386	195	191
