= Junnarpada =

Village in Maharashtra

- village
- Location in Maharashtra, India Junnarpada (India)
- Coordinates: 20.0103914°N 72.7939386°E
- Country: India
- State: Maharashtra
- District: Palghar
- Taluka: Dahanu
- Elevation: 57 m (187 ft)

Population (2011)
  - Total: 3,245
- Time zone: UTC+5:30 (IST)
- 2011 census code: 551602

Junnarpada is a village in the Palghar district of Maharashtra, India. It is located in the Dahanu taluka.

== Demographics ==
According to the 2011 census of India, Junnarpada has 679 households. The effective literacy rate (i.e. the literacy rate of population excluding children aged 6 and below) is 43.2%.

Demographics (2011 Census)
| | Total | Male | Female |
|---|---|---|---|
| Population | 3245 | 1553 | 1692 |
| Children aged below 6 years | 553 | 282 | 271 |
| Scheduled caste | 1 | 0 | 1 |
| Scheduled tribe | 3172 | 1523 | 1649 |
| Literates | 1163 | 665 | 498 |
| Workers (all) | 1709 | 880 | 829 |
| Main workers (total) | 1189 | 650 | 539 |
| Main workers: Cultivators | 143 | 76 | 67 |
| Main workers: Agricultural labourers | 556 | 260 | 296 |
| Main workers: Household industry workers | 5 | 3 | 2 |
| Main workers: Other | 485 | 311 | 174 |
| Marginal workers (total) | 520 | 230 | 290 |
| Marginal workers: Cultivators | 40 | 18 | 22 |
| Marginal workers: Agricultural labourers | 397 | 172 | 225 |
| Marginal workers: Household industry workers | 2 | 1 | 1 |
| Marginal workers: Others | 81 | 39 | 42 |
| Non-workers | 1536 | 673 | 863 |
