= Bhisenagar =

Village in Maharashtra

- village
- Location in Maharashtra, India Bhisenagar (India)
- Coordinates: 19.9071525°N 72.9364598°E
- Country: India
- State: Maharashtra
- District: Palghar
- Taluka: Dahanu
- Elevation: 43 m (141 ft)

Population (2011)
  - Total: 3,693
- Time zone: UTC+5:30 (IST)
- ISO 3166 code: IN-MH
- 2011 census code: 551697

Bhisenagar is a village in the Palghar district of Maharashtra, India. It is located in the Dahanu taluka.

== Demographics ==
According to the 2011 census of India, Bhisenagar has 818 households. The effective literacy rate (i.e. the literacy rate of population excluding children aged 6 and below) is 83.43%.

Demographics (2011 Census)
	Total	Male	Female
Population	3693	1911	1782
Children aged below 6 years	459	226	233
Scheduled caste	251	139	112
Scheduled tribe	1579	786	793
Literates	2698	1507	1191
Workers (all)	1370	1013	357
Main workers (total)	1227	920	307
Main workers: Cultivators	141	91	50
Main workers: Agricultural labourers	103	39	64
Main workers: Household industry workers	89	66	23
Main workers: Other	894	724	170
Marginal workers (total)	143	93	50
Marginal workers: Cultivators	19	11	8
Marginal workers: Agricultural labourers	56	35	21
Marginal workers: Household industry workers	14	9	5
Marginal workers: Others	54	38	16
Non-workers	2323	898	1425
