= Sarani, Dahanu =

Village in Maharashtra

Sarani
- village
- Location in Maharashtra, India Sarani (India)
- Coordinates: 19.9085016°N 72.9135734°E
- Country: India
- State: Maharashtra
- District: Palghar
- Taluka: Dahanu
- Elevation: 77 m (253 ft)

Population (2011)
  - Total: 1,613
- Time zone: UTC+5:30 (IST)
- 2011 census code: 551698

Sarani is a village in the Palghar district of Maharashtra, India. It is located in the Dahanu taluka.

== Demographics ==
According to the 2011 census of India, Sarani has 298 households. The effective literacy rate (i.e. the literacy rate of population excluding children aged 6 and below) is 49.19%.

Demographics (2011 Census)
| | Total | Male | Female |
|---|---|---|---|
| Population | 1613 | 799 | 814 |
| Children aged below 6 years | 251 | 127 | 124 |
| Scheduled caste | 1 | 1 | 0 |
| Scheduled tribe | 1572 | 779 | 793 |
| Literates | 670 | 421 | 249 |
| Workers (all) | 940 | 460 | 480 |
| Main workers (total) | 375 | 189 | 186 |
| Main workers: Cultivators | 156 | 92 | 64 |
| Main workers: Agricultural labourers | 178 | 74 | 104 |
| Main workers: Household industry workers | 0 | 0 | 0 |
| Main workers: Other | 41 | 23 | 18 |
| Marginal workers (total) | 565 | 271 | 294 |
| Marginal workers: Cultivators | 105 | 76 | 29 |
| Marginal workers: Agricultural labourers | 428 | 179 | 249 |
| Marginal workers: Household industry workers | 17 | 7 | 10 |
| Marginal workers: Others | 15 | 9 | 6 |
| Non-workers | 673 | 339 | 334 |
