= Pandhartaragaon =

Village in Maharashtra

- village
- Location in Maharashtra, India Pandhartaragaon (India)
- Coordinates: 20.0375594°N 72.937198°E
- Country: India
- State: Maharashtra
- District: Palghar
- Taluka: Dahanu
- Elevation: 121 m (397 ft)

Population (2011)
  - Total: 1,230
- Time zone: UTC+5:30 (IST)
- ISO 3166 code: IN-MH
- 2011 census code: 551654

Pandhartaragaon is a village in the Palghar district of Maharashtra, India. It is located in the Dahanu taluka.

== Demographics ==
According to the 2011 census of India, Pandhartaragaon has 252 households. The effective literacy rate (i.e. the literacy rate of population excluding children aged 6 and below) is 55.81%.

Demographics (2011 Census)
	Total	Male	Female
Population	1230	595	635
Children aged below 6 years	223	99	124
Scheduled caste	0	0	0
Scheduled tribe	1216	590	626
Literates	562	367	195
Workers (all)	691	336	355
Main workers (total)	371	188	183
Main workers: Cultivators	111	58	53
Main workers: Agricultural labourers	237	114	123
Main workers: Household industry workers	2	0	2
Main workers: Other	21	16	5
Marginal workers (total)	320	148	172
Marginal workers: Cultivators	28	15	13
Marginal workers: Agricultural labourers	259	103	156
Marginal workers: Household industry workers	3	3	0
Marginal workers: Others	30	27	3
Non-workers	539	259	280
