= Vangarje =

Village in Maharashtra

- village
- Location in Maharashtra, India Vangarje (India)
- Coordinates: 19.8702318°N 72.9637728°E
- Country: India
- State: Maharashtra
- District: Palghar
- Taluka: Dahanu
- Elevation: 63 m (207 ft)

Population (2011)
  - Total: 2,702
- Time zone: UTC+5:30 (IST)
- 2011 census code: 551748

Vangarje is a village in the Palghar district of Maharashtra, India. It is located in the Dahanu taluka.

== Demographics ==
According to the 2011 census of India, Vangarje has 527 households. The effective literacy rate (i.e. the literacy rate of population excluding children aged 6 and below) is 32.75%.

Demographics (2011 Census)
	Total	Male	Female
Population	2702	1318	1384
Children aged below 6 years	543	285	258
Scheduled caste	0	0	0
Scheduled tribe	2701	1317	1384
Literates	707	436	271
Workers (all)	1478	710	768
Main workers (total)	883	498	385
Main workers: Cultivators	307	226	81
Main workers: Agricultural labourers	558	260	298
Main workers: Household industry workers	2	0	2
Main workers: Other	16	12	4
Marginal workers (total)	595	212	383
Marginal workers: Cultivators	512	179	333
Marginal workers: Agricultural labourers	77	29	48
Marginal workers: Household industry workers	1	0	1
Marginal workers: Others	5	4	1
Non-workers	1224	608	616
