= Awadhani =

Village in Maharashtra

- village
- Location in Maharashtra, India Awadhani (India)
- Coordinates: 19.9591735°N 72.9017603°E
- Country: India
- State: Maharashtra
- District: Palghar
- Taluka: Dahanu
- Elevation: 72 m (236 ft)

Population (2011)
  - Total: 2,137
- Time zone: UTC+5:30 (IST)
- 2011 census code: 551683

Awadhani is a village in the Palghar district of Maharashtra, India. It is located in the Dahanu taluka.

== Demographics ==
According to the 2011 census of India, Awadhani has 342 households. The effective literacy rate (i.e. the literacy rate of population excluding children aged 6 and below) is 36.66%.

Demographics (2011 Census)
	Total	Male	Female
Population	2137	1027	1110
Children aged below 6 years	375	172	203
Scheduled caste	0	0	0
Scheduled tribe	2126	1021	1105
Literates	646	448	198
Workers (all)	1338	648	690
Main workers (total)	1018	569	449
Main workers: Cultivators	670	389	281
Main workers: Agricultural labourers	331	169	162
Main workers: Household industry workers	3	1	2
Main workers: Other	14	10	4
Marginal workers (total)	320	79	241
Marginal workers: Cultivators	7	4	3
Marginal workers: Agricultural labourers	311	73	238
Marginal workers: Household industry workers	0	0	0
Marginal workers: Others	2	2	0
Non-workers	799	379	420
