= Shisne =

Village in Maharashtra

- village
- Location in Maharashtra, India Shisne (India)
- Coordinates: 20.022024°N 72.9549149°E
- Country: India
- State: Maharashtra
- District: Palghar
- Taluka: Dahanu
- Elevation: 137 m (449 ft)

Population (2011)
  - Total: 1,910
- Time zone: UTC+5:30 (IST)
- 2011 census code: 551656

Shisne is a village in the Palghar district of Maharashtra, India. It is located in the Dahanu taluka.

== Demographics ==
According to the 2011 census of India, Shisne has 442 households. The effective literacy rate (i.e. the literacy rate of population excluding children aged 6 and below) is 38.13%.

Demographics (2011 Census)
| | Total | Male | Female |
|---|---|---|---|
| Population | 1910 | 894 | 1016 |
| Children aged below 6 years | 415 | 196 | 219 |
| Scheduled caste | 0 | 0 | 0 |
| Scheduled tribe | 1883 | 873 | 1010 |
| Literates | 570 | 367 | 203 |
| Workers (all) | 975 | 444 | 531 |
| Main workers (total) | 923 | 424 | 499 |
| Main workers: Cultivators | 520 | 244 | 276 |
| Main workers: Agricultural labourers | 338 | 137 | 201 |
| Main workers: Household industry workers | 0 | 0 | 0 |
| Main workers: Other | 65 | 43 | 22 |
| Marginal workers (total) | 52 | 20 | 32 |
| Marginal workers: Cultivators | 6 | 4 | 2 |
| Marginal workers: Agricultural labourers | 27 | 10 | 17 |
| Marginal workers: Household industry workers | 0 | 0 | 0 |
| Marginal workers: Others | 19 | 6 | 13 |
| Non-workers | 935 | 450 | 485 |
