= Osarvira =

Village in Maharashtra

- village
- Location in Maharashtra, India Osarvira (India)
- Coordinates: 20.0129321°N 73.364975°E
- Country: India
- State: Maharashtra
- District: Palghar
- Taluka: Dahanu
- Elevation: 282 m (925 ft)

Population (2011)
  - Total: 1,494
- Time zone: UTC+5:30 (IST)
- 2011 census code: 551677

Osarvira is a village in the Palghar district of Maharashtra, India. It is located in the Dahanu taluka.

== Demographics ==
According to the 2011 census of India, Osarvira has 403 households. The effective literacy rate (i.e. the literacy rate of population excluding children aged 6 and below) is 36.3%.

Demographics (2011 Census)
	Total	Male	Female
Population	1494	693	801
Children aged below 6 years	293	158	135
Scheduled caste	0	0	0
Scheduled tribe	1483	686	797
Literates	436	299	137
Workers (all)	745	337	408
Main workers (total)	697	308	389
Main workers: Cultivators	599	261	338
Main workers: Agricultural labourers	75	32	43
Main workers: Household industry workers	3	3	0
Main workers: Other	20	12	8
Marginal workers (total)	48	29	19
Marginal workers: Cultivators	9	4	5
Marginal workers: Agricultural labourers	28	18	10
Marginal workers: Household industry workers	1	1	0
Marginal workers: Others	10	6	4
Non-workers	749	356	393
