= Pimpalshet Budruk =

Village in Maharashtra

Pimpalshet Budruk Pimpalshet Bk.
- village
- Location in Maharashtra, India Pimpalshet Budruk (India)
- Coordinates: 19.8495014°N 72.9873924°E
- Country: India
- State: Maharashtra
- District: Palghar
- Taluka: Dahanu
- Elevation: 113 m (371 ft)

Population (2011)
  - Total: 1,515
- Time zone: UTC+5:30 (IST)
- 2011 census code: 551749

Pimpalshet Budruk is a village in the Palghar district of Maharashtra, India. It is located in the Dahanu taluka.

== Demographics ==
According to the 2011 census of India, Pimpalshet Budruk has 274 households. The effective literacy rate (i.e. the literacy rate of population excluding children aged 6 and below) is 33.69%.

Demographics (2011 Census)
	Total	Male	Female
Population	1515	750	765
Children aged below 6 years	289	139	150
Scheduled caste	0	0	0
Scheduled tribe	1511	746	765
Literates	413	278	135
Workers (all)	829	411	418
Main workers (total)	296	141	155
Main workers: Cultivators	189	87	102
Main workers: Agricultural labourers	97	47	50
Main workers: Household industry workers	0	0	0
Main workers: Other	10	7	3
Marginal workers (total)	533	270	263
Marginal workers: Cultivators	90	66	24
Marginal workers: Agricultural labourers	441	203	238
Marginal workers: Household industry workers	0	0	0
Marginal workers: Others	2	1	1
Non-workers	686	339	347
