= Shensari =

Village in Maharashtra

- village
- Location in Maharashtra, India Shensari (India)
- Coordinates: 19.9705103°N 73.0464309°E
- Country: India
- State: Maharashtra
- District: Palghar
- Taluka: Dahanu
- Elevation: 202 m (663 ft)

Population (2011)
  - Total: 2,001
- Time zone: UTC+5:30 (IST)
- 2011 census code: 551665

Shensari is a village in the Palghar district of Maharashtra, India. It is located in the Dahanu taluka.

== Demographics ==
According to the 2011 census of India, Shensari has 378 households. The effective literacy rate (i.e. the literacy rate of population excluding children aged 6 and below) is 32.07%.

Demographics (2011 Census)
	Total	Male	Female
Population	2001	1005	996
Children aged below 6 years	364	199	165
Scheduled caste	0	0	0
Scheduled tribe	1937	975	962
Literates	525	327	198
Workers (all)	1191	603	588
Main workers (total)	907	463	444
Main workers: Cultivators	339	170	169
Main workers: Agricultural labourers	517	258	259
Main workers: Household industry workers	10	5	5
Main workers: Other	41	30	11
Marginal workers (total)	284	140	144
Marginal workers: Cultivators	25	11	14
Marginal workers: Agricultural labourers	248	125	123
Marginal workers: Household industry workers	5	2	3
Marginal workers: Others	6	2	4
Non-workers	810	402	408
