= Sawata =

Village in Maharashtra

Sawata Savata
- village
- Location in Maharashtra, India Sawata (India)
- Coordinates: 19.9699115°N 72.7776873°E
- Country: India
- State: Maharashtra
- District: Palghar
- Taluka: Dahanu
- Elevation: 11 m (36 ft)

Population (2011)
  - Total: 1,594
- Time zone: UTC+5:30 (IST)
- 2011 census code: 551611

Sawata is a village in the Palghar district of Maharashtra, India. It is located in the Dahanu taluka.

== Demographics ==
According to the 2011 census of India, Sawata has 348 households. The effective literacy rate (i.e. the literacy rate of population excluding children aged 6 and below) is 58.26%.

Demographics (2011 Census)
	Total	Male	Female
Population	1594	791	803
Children aged below 6 years	183	95	88
Scheduled caste	1	0	1
Scheduled tribe	846	415	431
Literates	822	490	332
Workers (all)	704	406	298
Main workers (total)	626	357	269
Main workers: Cultivators	67	45	22
Main workers: Agricultural labourers	139	60	79
Main workers: Household industry workers	6	6	0
Main workers: Other	414	246	168
Marginal workers (total)	78	49	29
Marginal workers: Cultivators	7	4	3
Marginal workers: Agricultural labourers	19	11	8
Marginal workers: Household industry workers	1	0	1
Marginal workers: Others	51	34	17
Non-workers	890	385	505
