= Vivalvedhe =

Village in Maharashtra

- village
- Location in Maharashtra, India Vivalvedhe (India)
- Coordinates: 19.947394°N 72.9283391°E
- Country: India
- State: Maharashtra
- District: Palghar
- Taluka: Dahanu
- Elevation: 92 m (302 ft)

Population (2011)
  - Total: 1,754
- Time zone: UTC+5:30 (IST)
- 2011 census code: 551682

Vivalvedhe is a village in the Palghar district of Maharashtra, India. It is located in the Dahanu taluka.

== Demographics ==
According to the 2011 census of India, Vivalvedhe has 308 households. The effective literacy rate (i.e. the literacy rate of population excluding children aged 6 and below) is 65.22%.

Demographics (2011 Census)
	Total	Male	Female
Population	1754	880	874
Children aged below 6 years	233	104	129
Scheduled caste	6	2	4
Scheduled tribe	1553	776	777
Literates	992	598	394
Workers (all)	756	379	377
Main workers (total)	635	325	310
Main workers: Cultivators	200	100	100
Main workers: Agricultural labourers	331	153	178
Main workers: Household industry workers	4	2	2
Main workers: Other	100	70	30
Marginal workers (total)	121	54	67
Marginal workers: Cultivators	9	4	5
Marginal workers: Agricultural labourers	104	46	58
Marginal workers: Household industry workers	3	0	3
Marginal workers: Others	5	4	1
Non-workers	998	501	497
