= Nandare =

Village in Maharashtra

- village
- Location in Maharashtra, India Nandare (India)
- Coordinates: 20.0129091°N 72.761435°E
- Country: India
- State: Maharashtra
- District: Palghar
- Taluka: Dahanu
- Elevation: 32 m (105 ft)

Population (2011)
  - Total: 444
- Time zone: UTC+5:30 (IST)
- 2011 census code: 551597

Nandare is a village in the Palghar district of Maharashtra, India. It is located in the Dahanu taluka.

== Demographics ==
According to the 2011 census of India, Nandare has 91 households. The effective literacy rate (i.e. the literacy rate of population excluding children aged 6 and below) is 42.58%.

Demographics (2011 Census)
	Total	Male	Female
Population	444	239	205
Children aged below 6 years	87	56	31
Scheduled caste	0	0	0
Scheduled tribe	430	228	202
Literates	152	97	55
Workers (all)	231	128	103
Main workers (total)	230	128	102
Main workers: Cultivators	4	4	0
Main workers: Agricultural labourers	207	110	97
Main workers: Household industry workers	2	0	2
Main workers: Other	17	14	3
Marginal workers (total)	1	0	1
Marginal workers: Cultivators	0	0	0
Marginal workers: Agricultural labourers	1	0	1
Marginal workers: Household industry workers	0	0	0
Marginal workers: Others	0	0	0
Non-workers	213	111	102
