= Jambugaon =

Village in Maharashtra

- village
- Location in Maharashtra, India Jambugaon (India)
- Coordinates: 20.0890473°N 72.7599575°E
- Country: India
- State: Maharashtra
- District: Palghar
- Taluka: Dahanu
- Elevation: 23 m (75 ft)

Population (2011)
  - Total: 7,298
- Time zone: UTC+5:30 (IST)
- 2011 census code: 551579

Jambugaon is a village in the Palghar district of Maharashtra, India. It is located in the Dahanu taluka.

== Demographics ==
According to the 2011 census of India, Jambugaon has 1509 households. The effective literacy rate (i.e. the literacy rate of population excluding children aged 6 and below) is 49.22%.

Demographics (2011 Census)
	Total	Male	Female
Population	7298	3443	3855
Children aged below 6 years	1183	589	594
Scheduled caste	0	0	0
Scheduled tribe	7170	3373	3797
Literates	3010	1768	1242
Workers (all)	3511	1866	1645
Main workers (total)	2981	1652	1329
Main workers: Cultivators	218	153	65
Main workers: Agricultural labourers	2128	1037	1091
Main workers: Household industry workers	16	10	6
Main workers: Other	619	452	167
Marginal workers (total)	530	214	316
Marginal workers: Cultivators	58	17	41
Marginal workers: Agricultural labourers	357	137	220
Marginal workers: Household industry workers	0	0	0
Marginal workers: Others	115	60	55
Non-workers	3787	1577	2210
