= Narpad =

Village in Maharashtra

- village
- Location in Maharashtra, India Narpad (India)
- Coordinates: 20.014532°N 72.7200608°E
- Country: India
- State: Maharashtra
- District: Palghar
- Taluka: Dahanu
- Elevation: 12 m (39 ft)

Population (2011)
  - Total: 2,759
- Time zone: UTC+5:30 (IST)
- ISO 3166 code: IN-MH
- 2011 census code: 551589

Narpad is a village in the Palghar district of Maharashtra, India. It is located in the Dahanu taluka.

== Demographics ==
According to the 2011 census of India, Narpad has 695 households. The effective literacy rate (i.e. the literacy rate of population excluding children aged 6 and below) is 81.71%.

Demographics (2011 Census)
	Total	Male	Female
Population	2759	1337	1422
Children aged below 6 years	250	120	130
Scheduled caste	453	220	233
Scheduled tribe	789	369	420
Literates	2050	1064	986
Workers (all)	1202	763	439
Main workers (total)	893	599	294
Main workers: Cultivators	75	58	17
Main workers: Agricultural labourers	23	8	15
Main workers: Household industry workers	102	32	70
Main workers: Other	693	501	192
Marginal workers (total)	309	164	145
Marginal workers: Cultivators	10	3	7
Marginal workers: Agricultural labourers	187	84	103
Marginal workers: Household industry workers	7	4	3
Marginal workers: Others	105	73	32
Non-workers	1557	574	983
