= Bhavadi =

Village in Maharashtra

- village
- Location in Maharashtra, India Bhavadi (India)
- Coordinates: 19.9251213°N 73.0095336°E
- Country: India
- State: Maharashtra
- District: Palghar
- Taluka: Dahanu
- Elevation: 65 m (213 ft)

Population (2011)
  - Total: 201
- Time zone: UTC+5:30 (IST)
- ISO 3166 code: IN-MH
- 2011 census code: 551744

Bhavadi is a village in the Palghar district of Maharashtra, India. It is located in the Dahanu taluka.

== Demographics ==
According to the 2011 census of India, Bhavadi has 56 households. The effective literacy rate (i.e. the literacy rate of population excluding children aged 6 and below) is 37.35%.

Demographics (2011 Census)
	Total	Male	Female
Population	201	93	108
Children aged below 6 years	35	18	17
Scheduled caste	0	0	0
Scheduled tribe	200	92	108
Literates	62	38	24
Workers (all)	135	63	72
Main workers (total)	112	59	53
Main workers: Cultivators	85	47	38
Main workers: Agricultural labourers	23	10	13
Main workers: Household industry workers	0	0	0
Main workers: Other	4	2	2
Marginal workers (total)	23	4	19
Marginal workers: Cultivators	12	3	9
Marginal workers: Agricultural labourers	11	1	10
Marginal workers: Household industry workers	0	0	0
Marginal workers: Others	0	0	0
Non-workers	66	30	36
