= Nikavali =

Village in Maharashtra

- village
- Location in Maharashtra, India Nikavali (India)
- Coordinates: 19.8964018°N 72.9076669°E
- Country: India
- State: Maharashtra
- District: Palghar
- Taluka: Dahanu
- Elevation: 54 m (177 ft)

Population (2011)
  - Total: 524
- Time zone: UTC+5:30 (IST)
- 2011 census code: 551707

Nikavali is a village in the Palghar district of Maharashtra, India. It is located in the Dahanu taluka.

== Demographics ==
According to the 2011 census of India, Nikavali has 108 households. The effective literacy rate (i.e. the literacy rate of population excluding children aged 6 and below) is 65.75%.

Demographics (2011 Census)
	Total	Male	Female
Population	524	272	252
Children aged below 6 years	86	50	36
Scheduled caste	1	1	0
Scheduled tribe	502	259	243
Literates	288	192	96
Workers (all)	312	163	149
Main workers (total)	311	162	149
Main workers: Cultivators	282	144	138
Main workers: Agricultural labourers	12	6	6
Main workers: Household industry workers	0	0	0
Main workers: Other	17	12	5
Marginal workers (total)	1	1	0
Marginal workers: Cultivators	0	0	0
Marginal workers: Agricultural labourers	0	0	0
Marginal workers: Household industry workers	0	0	0
Marginal workers: Others	1	1	0
Non-workers	212	109	103
