= Dhakti Dahanu =

Village in Maharashtra

- village
- Location in Maharashtra, India Dhakti Dahanu (India)
- Coordinates: 19.9672489°N 72.7148885°E
- Country: India
- State: Maharashtra
- District: Palghar
- Taluka: Dahanu
- Elevation: 5 m (16 ft)

Population (2011)
  - Total: 4,903
- Time zone: UTC+5:30 (IST)
- 2011 census code: 551714

Dhakti Dahanu is a village in the Palghar district of Maharashtra, India. It is located in the Dahanu taluka, on the shore of Arabian Sea.Located just other side of the Dahanu khadi (Dahanu Creek) from the town, it is connected with Dahanu by bridge over the creek.

The village is famous for fresh sea water fish which are available cheaply and thus people from nearby area like Tarapur, Boisar, Dahanu visits this place for fresh fish. People of Mangela and Bari community dominate the village with significant amount of Bhandari and also warli people live in large numbers in villages nearby.

== Demographics ==
According to the 2011 census of India, Dhakti Dahanu has 1079 households. The effective literacy rate (i.e. the literacy rate of population excluding children aged 6 and below) is 85.24%.

Demographics (2011 Census)
	Total	Male	Female
Population	4903	2419	2484
Children aged below 6 years	465	247	218
Scheduled caste	26	14	12
Scheduled tribe	283	138	145
Literates	3783	1966	1817
Workers (all)	1729	1360	369
Main workers (total)	1387	1209	178
Main workers: Cultivators	57	43	14
Main workers: Agricultural labourers	21	15	6
Main workers: Household industry workers	60	60	0
Main workers: Other	1249	1091	158
Marginal workers (total)	342	151	191
Marginal workers: Cultivators	28	19	9
Marginal workers: Agricultural labourers	37	23	14
Marginal workers: Household industry workers	40	19	21
Marginal workers: Others	237	90	147
Non-workers	3174	1059	2115
