= Gaurwadi =

Village in Maharashtra

- village
- Location in Maharashtra, India Gaurwadi (India)
- Coordinates: 19.9688508°N 72.8249607°E
- Country: India
- State: Maharashtra
- District: Palghar
- Taluka: Dahanu
- Elevation: 220 m (720 ft)

Population (2011)
  - Total: 1,844
- Time zone: UTC+5:30 (IST)
- ISO 3166 code: IN-MH
- 2011 census code: 551606

Gaurwadi is a village in the Palghar district of Maharashtra, India. It is located in the Dahanu taluka.

== Demographics ==
According to the 2011 census of India, Gaurwadi has 338 households. The effective literacy rate (i.e. the literacy rate of population excluding children aged 6 and below) is 45.78%.

Demographics (2011 Census)
	Total	Male	Female
Population	1844	870	974
Children aged below 6 years	341	149	192
Scheduled caste	0	0	0
Scheduled tribe	1831	867	964
Literates	688	425	263
Workers (all)	984	523	461
Main workers (total)	832	484	348
Main workers: Cultivators	263	124	139
Main workers: Agricultural labourers	324	184	140
Main workers: Household industry workers	9	3	6
Main workers: Other	236	173	63
Marginal workers (total)	152	39	113
Marginal workers: Cultivators	12	4	8
Marginal workers: Agricultural labourers	103	13	90
Marginal workers: Household industry workers	0	0	0
Marginal workers: Others	37	22	15
Non-workers	860	347	513
