= Talothe =

Village in Maharashtra

- village
- Location in Maharashtra, India Talothe (India)
- Coordinates: 20.0344709°N 72.8914233°E
- Country: India
- State: Maharashtra
- District: Palghar
- Taluka: Dahanu
- Elevation: 64 m (210 ft)

Population (2011)
  - Total: 529
- Time zone: UTC+5:30 (IST)
- 2011 census code: 551649

Talothe is a village in the Palghar district of Maharashtra, India. It is located in the Dahanu taluka.

== Demographics ==
According to the 2011 census of India, Talothe has 142 households. The effective literacy rate (i.e. the literacy rate of population excluding children aged 6 and below) is 38.8%.

Demographics (2011 Census)
	Total	Male	Female
Population	529	238	291
Children aged below 6 years	114	47	67
Scheduled caste	0	0	0
Scheduled tribe	528	237	291
Literates	161	107	54
Workers (all)	354	156	198
Main workers (total)	335	143	192
Main workers: Cultivators	317	128	189
Main workers: Agricultural labourers	2	2	0
Main workers: Household industry workers	0	0	0
Main workers: Other	16	13	3
Marginal workers (total)	19	13	6
Marginal workers: Cultivators	6	3	3
Marginal workers: Agricultural labourers	0	0	0
Marginal workers: Household industry workers	2	1	1
Marginal workers: Others	11	9	2
Non-workers	175	82	93
