= Varor =

Village in Maharashtra

- village
- Location in Maharashtra, India Varor (India)
- Coordinates: 19.9068046°N 72.6786796°E
- Country: India
- State: Maharashtra
- District: Palghar
- Taluka: Dahanu
- Elevation: 8 m (26 ft)

Population (2011)
  - Total: 2,810
- Time zone: UTC+5:30 (IST)
- 2011 census code: 551723

Varor is a village in the Palghar district of Maharashtra, India. It is located in the Dahanu taluka.

== Demographics ==
According to the 2011 census of India, Varor has 678 households. The effective literacy rate (i.e. the literacy rate of population excluding children aged 6 and below) is 87.63%.

Demographics (2011 Census)
	Total	Male	Female
Population	2810	1392	1418
Children aged below 6 years	247	136	111
Scheduled caste	204	99	105
Scheduled tribe	506	251	255
Literates	2246	1166	1080
Workers (all)	1099	804	295
Main workers (total)	962	722	240
Main workers: Cultivators	64	49	15
Main workers: Agricultural labourers	242	129	113
Main workers: Household industry workers	153	127	26
Main workers: Other	503	417	86
Marginal workers (total)	137	82	55
Marginal workers: Cultivators	20	12	8
Marginal workers: Agricultural labourers	72	36	36
Marginal workers: Household industry workers	16	11	5
Marginal workers: Others	29	23	6
Non-workers	1711	588	1123
