= Tadiyale =

Village in Maharashtra

Tadiyale Tadiyala
- village
- Location in Maharashtra, India Tadiyale (India)
- Coordinates: 19.964131°N 72.7052826°E
- Country: India
- State: Maharashtra
- District: Palghar
- Taluka: Dahanu
- Elevation: 7 m (23 ft)

Population (2011)
  - Total: 1,062
- Time zone: UTC+5:30 (IST)
- 2011 census code: 551715

Tadiyale is a village in the Palghar district of Maharashtra, India. It is located in the Dahanu taluka, on the shore of Arabian Sea.

== Demographics ==
According to the 2011 census of India, Tadiyale has 230 households. The effective literacy rate (i.e. the literacy rate of population excluding children aged 6 and below) is 86.09%.

Demographics (2011 Census)
| | Total | Male | Female |
|---|---|---|---|
| Population | 1062 | 547 | 515 |
| Children aged below 6 years | 99 | 52 | 47 |
| Scheduled caste | 15 | 5 | 10 |
| Scheduled tribe | 35 | 15 | 20 |
| Literates | 829 | 452 | 377 |
| Workers (all) | 400 | 329 | 71 |
| Main workers (total) | 361 | 312 | 49 |
| Main workers: Cultivators | 36 | 33 | 3 |
| Main workers: Agricultural labourers | 5 | 2 | 3 |
| Main workers: Household industry workers | 50 | 37 | 13 |
| Main workers: Other | 270 | 240 | 30 |
| Marginal workers (total) | 39 | 17 | 22 |
| Marginal workers: Cultivators | 10 | 5 | 5 |
| Marginal workers: Agricultural labourers | 10 | 4 | 6 |
| Marginal workers: Household industry workers | 8 | 2 | 6 |
| Marginal workers: Others | 11 | 6 | 5 |
| Non-workers | 662 | 218 | 444 |
