= Dahyale =

Village in Maharashtra

- village
- Location in Maharashtra, India Dahyale (India)
- Coordinates: 19.9713344°N 72.9667254°E
- Country: India
- State: Maharashtra
- District: Palghar
- Taluka: Dahanu
- Elevation: 97 m (318 ft)

Population (2011)
  - Total: 1,348
- Time zone: UTC+5:30 (IST)
- ISO 3166 code: IN-MH
- 2011 census code: 551679

Dahyale is a village in the Palghar district of Maharashtra, India. It is located in the Dahanu taluka.

== Demographics ==
According to the 2011 census of India, Dahyale has 267 households. The effective literacy rate (i.e. the literacy rate of population excluding children aged 6 and below) is 30.63%.

Demographics (2011 Census)
	Total	Male	Female
Population	1348	621	727
Children aged below 6 years	251	113	138
Scheduled caste	0	0	0
Scheduled tribe	1348	621	727
Literates	336	203	133
Workers (all)	767	338	429
Main workers (total)	602	282	320
Main workers: Cultivators	311	154	157
Main workers: Agricultural labourers	267	111	156
Main workers: Household industry workers	1	1	0
Main workers: Other	23	16	7
Marginal workers (total)	165	56	109
Marginal workers: Cultivators	2	1	1
Marginal workers: Agricultural labourers	123	31	92
Marginal workers: Household industry workers	0	0	0
Marginal workers: Others	40	24	16
Non-workers	581	283	298
