= Varoti =

Village in Maharashtra

- village
- Location in Maharashtra, India Varoti (India)
- Coordinates: 19.9010446°N 72.9549149°E
- Country: India
- State: Maharashtra
- District: Palghar
- Taluka: Dahanu
- Elevation: 46 m (151 ft)

Population (2011)
  - Total: 1,365
- Time zone: UTC+5:30 (IST)
- 2011 census code: 551695

Varoti is a village in the Palghar district of Maharashtra, India. It is located in the Dahanu taluka.

== Demographics ==
According to the 2011 census of India, Varoti has 270 households with its effective literacy rate (i.e. the literacy rate of population excluding children aged 6 and below) at 62.34%.

Demographics (2011 Census)
	Total	Male	Female
Population	1365	696	669
Children aged below 6 years	287	149	138
Scheduled caste	4	3	1
Scheduled tribe	763	389	374
Literates	672	393	279
Workers (all)	621	379	242
Main workers (total)	450	328	122
Main workers: Cultivators	94	64	30
Main workers: Agricultural labourers	34	27	7
Main workers: Household industry workers	58	38	20
Main workers: Other	264	199	65
Marginal workers (total)	171	51	120
Marginal workers: Cultivators	70	20	50
Marginal workers: Agricultural labourers	22	8	14
Marginal workers: Household industry workers	11	2	9
Marginal workers: Others	68	21	47
Non-workers	744	317	427
