= Bharad =

Village in Maharashtra

- village
- Location in Maharashtra, India Bharad (India)
- Coordinates: 19.8981444°N 72.925386°E
- Country: India
- State: Maharashtra
- District: Palghar
- Taluka: Dahanu
- Elevation: 38 m (125 ft)

Population (2011)
  - Total: 1,859
- Time zone: UTC+5:30 (IST)
- 2011 census code: 551708

Bharad is a village in the Palghar district of Maharashtra, India. It is located in the Dahanu taluka.

== Demographics ==
According to the 2011 census of India, Bharad has 399 households. The effective literacy rate (i.e. the literacy rate of population excluding children aged 6 and below) is 56.61%.

Demographics (2011 Census)
	Total	Male	Female
Population	1859	904	955
Children aged below 6 years	354	172	182
Scheduled caste	1	1	0
Scheduled tribe	1745	805	940
Literates	852	527	325
Workers (all)	989	453	536
Main workers (total)	892	419	473
Main workers: Cultivators	659	303	356
Main workers: Agricultural labourers	150	62	88
Main workers: Household industry workers	0	0	0
Main workers: Other	83	54	29
Marginal workers (total)	97	34	63
Marginal workers: Cultivators	77	25	52
Marginal workers: Agricultural labourers	14	8	6
Marginal workers: Household industry workers	2	0	2
Marginal workers: Others	4	1	3
Non-workers	870	451	419
