= Kandarwadi =

Village in Maharashtra

- village
- Location in Maharashtra, India Kandarwadi (India)
- Coordinates: 19.9981326°N 72.9755829°E
- Country: India
- State: Maharashtra
- District: Palghar
- Taluka: Dahanu
- Elevation: 131 m (430 ft)

Population (2011)
  - Total: 1,965
- Time zone: UTC+5:30 (IST)
- ISO 3166 code: IN-MH
- 2011 census code: 551678

Kandarwadi is a village in the Palghar district of Maharashtra, India. It is located in the Dahanu taluka.

== Demographics ==
According to the 2011 census of India, Kandarwadi has 335 households. The effective literacy rate (i.e. the literacy rate of population excluding children aged 6 and below) is 22.74%.

Demographics (2011 Census)
	Total	Male	Female
Population	1965	923	1042
Children aged below 6 years	448	223	225
Scheduled caste	0	0	0
Scheduled tribe	1964	923	1041
Literates	345	219	126
Workers (all)	1115	502	613
Main workers (total)	710	409	301
Main workers: Cultivators	124	70	54
Main workers: Agricultural labourers	575	332	243
Main workers: Household industry workers	3	2	1
Main workers: Other	8	5	3
Marginal workers (total)	405	93	312
Marginal workers: Cultivators	14	4	10
Marginal workers: Agricultural labourers	380	86	294
Marginal workers: Household industry workers	1	0	1
Marginal workers: Others	10	3	7
Non-workers	850	421	429
