= Gangodi =

Village in Maharashtra

- village
- Location in Maharashtra, India Gangodi (India)
- Coordinates: 19.9955771°N 73.0375761°E
- Country: India
- State: Maharashtra
- District: Palghar
- Taluka: Dahanu
- Elevation: 105 m (344 ft)

Population (2011)
  - Total: 1,363
- Time zone: UTC+5:30 (IST)
- 2011 census code: 551661

Gangodi is a village in the Palghar district of Maharashtra, India. It is located in the Dahanu taluka.

== Demographics ==
According to the 2011 census of India, Gangodi has 288 households. The effective literacy rate (i.e. the literacy rate of population excluding children aged 6 and below) is 35%.

Demographics (2011 Census)
	Total	Male	Female
Population	1363	652	711
Children aged below 6 years	243	134	109
Scheduled caste	0	0	0
Scheduled tribe	1361	651	710
Literates	392	244	148
Workers (all)	860	413	447
Main workers (total)	844	409	435
Main workers: Cultivators	651	303	348
Main workers: Agricultural labourers	167	91	76
Main workers: Household industry workers	0	0	0
Main workers: Other	26	15	11
Marginal workers (total)	16	4	12
Marginal workers: Cultivators	4	2	2
Marginal workers: Agricultural labourers	7	1	6
Marginal workers: Household industry workers	1	0	1
Marginal workers: Others	4	1	3
Non-workers	503	239	264
