= Tornipada =

Village in Maharashtra

- village
- Location in Maharashtra, India Tornipada (India)
- Coordinates: 20.0808096°N 72.9667254°E
- Country: India
- State: Maharashtra
- District: Palghar
- Taluka: Dahanu
- Elevation: 95 m (312 ft)

Population (2011)
  - Total: 284
- Time zone: UTC+5:30 (IST)
- ISO 3166 code: IN-MH
- 2011 census code: 551624

Tornipada is a village in the Palghar district of Maharashtra, India. It is located in the Dahanu taluka.

== Demographics ==
According to the 2011 census of India, Tornipada has 54 households. The effective literacy rate (i.e. the literacy rate of population excluding children aged 6 and below) is 45.85%.

Demographics (2011 Census)
| | Total | Male | Female |
|---|---|---|---|
| Population | 284 | 132 | 152 |
| Children aged below 6 years | 55 | 23 | 32 |
| Scheduled caste | 0 | 0 | 0 |
| Scheduled tribe | 284 | 132 | 152 |
| Literates | 105 | 74 | 31 |
| Workers (all) | 166 | 77 | 89 |
| Main workers (total) | 57 | 52 | 5 |
| Main workers: Cultivators | 31 | 28 | 3 |
| Main workers: Agricultural labourers | 17 | 15 | 2 |
| Main workers: Household industry workers | 0 | 0 | 0 |
| Main workers: Other | 9 | 9 | 0 |
| Marginal workers (total) | 109 | 25 | 84 |
| Marginal workers: Cultivators | 62 | 10 | 52 |
| Marginal workers: Agricultural labourers | 44 | 13 | 31 |
| Marginal workers: Household industry workers | 0 | 0 | 0 |
| Marginal workers: Others | 3 | 2 | 1 |
| Non-workers | 118 | 55 | 63 |
