= Punjave =

Village in Maharashtra

- village
- Location in Maharashtra, India Punjave (India)
- Coordinates: 20.0382287°N 72.9002836°E
- Country: India
- State: Maharashtra
- District: Palghar
- Taluka: Dahanu
- Elevation: 68 m (223 ft)

Population (2011)
  - Total: 467
- Time zone: UTC+5:30 (IST)
- ISO 3166 code: IN-MH
- 2011 census code: 551650

Punjave is a village in the Palghar district of Maharashtra, India. It is in the Dahanu taluka.

== Demographics ==
According to the 2011 census of India, Punjave has 83 households. The effective literacy rate (i.e. the literacy rate of population excluding children aged 6 and below) is 47.31%.

Demographics (2011 Census)
	Total	Male	Female
Population	467	232	235
Children aged below 6 years	76	37	39
Scheduled caste	6	2	4
Scheduled tribe	458	227	231
Literates	185	108	77
Workers (all)	275	132	143
Main workers (total)	273	132	141
Main workers: Cultivators	38	19	19
Main workers: Agricultural labourers	184	86	98
Main workers: Household industry workers	0	0	0
Main workers: Other	51	27	24
Marginal workers (total)	2	0	2
Marginal workers: Cultivators	0	0	0
Marginal workers: Agricultural labourers	2	0	2
Marginal workers: Household industry workers	0	0	0
Marginal workers: Others	0	0	0
Non-workers	192	100	92
