= Raitali =

Village in Maharashtra

- village
- Location in Maharashtra, India Raitali (India)
- Coordinates: 19.9343035°N 72.8249607°E
- Country: India
- State: Maharashtra
- District: Palghar
- Taluka: Dahanu
- Elevation: 73 m (240 ft)

Population (2011)
  - Total: 2,178
- Time zone: UTC+5:30 (IST)
- 2011 census code: 551687

Raitali is a village in the Palghar district of Maharashtra, India. It is located in the Dahanu taluka.

== Demographics ==
According to the 2011 census of India, Raitali has 368 households. The effective literacy rate (i.e. the literacy rate of population excluding children aged 6 and below) is 39.8%.

Demographics (2011 Census)
	Total	Male	Female
Population	2178	1067	1111
Children aged below 6 years	447	227	220
Scheduled caste	0	0	0
Scheduled tribe	2173	1065	1108
Literates	689	425	264
Workers (all)	1099	587	512
Main workers (total)	1062	575	487
Main workers: Cultivators	300	184	116
Main workers: Agricultural labourers	687	348	339
Main workers: Household industry workers	4	0	4
Main workers: Other	71	43	28
Marginal workers (total)	37	12	25
Marginal workers: Cultivators	2	0	2
Marginal workers: Agricultural labourers	32	10	22
Marginal workers: Household industry workers	0	0	0
Marginal workers: Others	3	2	1
Non-workers	1079	480	599
