= Ambivali Tarf Bahare =

Village in Maharashtra

- village
- Location in Maharashtra, India Ambivali Tarf Bahare (India)
- Coordinates: 20.0127649°N 72.9194798°E
- Country: India
- State: Maharashtra
- District: Palghar
- Taluka: Dahanu
- Elevation: 108 m (354 ft)

Population (2011)
  - Total: 2,055
- Time zone: UTC+5:30 (IST)
- 2011 census code: 551653

Ambivali Tarf Bahare is a village in the Palghar district of Maharashtra, India. It is located in the Dahanu taluka.

== Demographics ==
According to the 2011 census of India, Ambivali Tarf Bahare has 401 households. The effective literacy rate (i.e. the literacy rate of population excluding children aged 6 and below) is 42.6%.

Demographics (2011 Census)
	Total	Male	Female
Population	2055	1014	1041
Children aged below 6 years	400	199	201
Scheduled caste	5	2	3
Scheduled tribe	1963	962	1001
Literates	705	429	276
Workers (all)	1099	577	522
Main workers (total)	619	354	265
Main workers: Cultivators	109	90	19
Main workers: Agricultural labourers	417	195	222
Main workers: Household industry workers	2	0	2
Main workers: Other	91	69	22
Marginal workers (total)	480	223	257
Marginal workers: Cultivators	12	4	8
Marginal workers: Agricultural labourers	459	213	246
Marginal workers: Household industry workers	1	0	1
Marginal workers: Others	8	6	2
Non-workers	956	437	519
