= Chinchale =

Village in Maharashtra, India

- village
- Location in Maharashtra, India Chinchale (India)
- Coordinates: 20.0173577°N 72.9076669°E
- Country: India
- State: Maharashtra
- District: Palghar
- Taluka: Dahanu
- Elevation: 74 m (243 ft)

Population (2011)
  - Total: 1,449
- Time zone: UTC+5:30 (IST)
- ISO 3166 code: IN-MH
- 2011 census code: 551652

Chinchale is a village in the Palghar district of Maharashtra, India. It is located in the Dahanu taluka.

== Demographics ==
According to the 2011 census of India, Chinchale has 296 households. The effective literacy rate (i.e. the literacy rate of population excluding children aged 6 and below) is 57.18%.

Demographics (2011 Census)
	Total	Male	Female
Population	1449	749	700
Children aged below 6 years	216	105	111
Scheduled caste	0	0	0
Scheduled tribe	1379	699	680
Literates	705	434	271
Workers (all)	470	213	257
Main workers (total)	308	141	167
Main workers: Cultivators	221	99	122
Main workers: Agricultural labourers	52	22	30
Main workers: Household industry workers	12	10	2
Main workers: Other	23	10	13
Marginal workers (total)	162	72	90
Marginal workers: Cultivators	79	35	44
Marginal workers: Agricultural labourers	23	9	14
Marginal workers: Household industry workers	18	10	8
Marginal workers: Others	42	18	24
Non-workers	979	536	443
