= Vikasnagar, Dahanu =

Village in Maharashtra

Vikasnagar
- village
- Location in Maharashtra, India Vikasnagar (India)
- Coordinates: 20.0683285°N 72.7111939°E
- Country: India
- State: Maharashtra
- District: Palghar
- Taluka: Dahanu
- Elevation: 13 m (43 ft)

Population (2011)
  - Total: 1,630
- Time zone: UTC+5:30 (IST)
- 2011 census code: 551584

Vikasnagar is a village in the Palghar district of Maharashtra, India. It is located in the Dahanu taluka.

== Demographics ==
According to the 2011 census of India, Vikasnagar has 337 households. The effective literacy rate (i.e. the literacy rate of population excluding children aged 6 and below) is 64.91%.

Demographics (2011 Census)
| | Total | Male | Female |
|---|---|---|---|
| Population | 1630 | 805 | 825 |
| Children aged below 6 years | 228 | 116 | 112 |
| Scheduled caste | 0 | 0 | 0 |
| Scheduled tribe | 1569 | 776 | 793 |
| Literates | 910 | 524 | 386 |
| Workers (all) | 809 | 483 | 326 |
| Main workers (total) | 490 | 372 | 118 |
| Main workers: Cultivators | 29 | 21 | 8 |
| Main workers: Agricultural labourers | 292 | 209 | 83 |
| Main workers: Household industry workers | 2 | 2 | 0 |
| Main workers: Other | 167 | 140 | 27 |
| Marginal workers (total) | 319 | 111 | 208 |
| Marginal workers: Cultivators | 70 | 17 | 53 |
| Marginal workers: Agricultural labourers | 225 | 77 | 148 |
| Marginal workers: Household industry workers | 1 | 1 | 0 |
| Marginal workers: Others | 23 | 16 | 7 |
| Non-workers | 821 | 322 | 499 |
