= Nikane =

Village in Maharashtra

- village
- Location in Maharashtra, India Nikane (India)
- Coordinates: 19.8966635°N 72.8810859°E
- Country: India
- State: Maharashtra
- District: Palghar
- Taluka: Dahanu
- Elevation: 48 m (157 ft)

Population (2011)
  - Total: 1,975
- Time zone: UTC+5:30 (IST)
- 2011 census code: 551699

Nikane is a village in the Palghar district of Maharashtra, India. It is located in the Dahanu taluka.

== Demographics ==
According to the 2011 census of India, Nikane has 370 households. The effective literacy rate (i.e. the literacy rate of population excluding children aged 6 and below) is 45.6%.

Demographics (2011 Census)
	Total	Male	Female
Population	1975	965	1010
Children aged below 6 years	361	178	183
Scheduled caste	0	0	0
Scheduled tribe	1854	903	951
Literates	736	446	290
Workers (all)	1156	570	586
Main workers (total)	952	495	457
Main workers: Cultivators	415	253	162
Main workers: Agricultural labourers	486	209	277
Main workers: Household industry workers	10	3	7
Main workers: Other	41	30	11
Marginal workers (total)	204	75	129
Marginal workers: Cultivators	25	17	8
Marginal workers: Agricultural labourers	158	45	113
Marginal workers: Household industry workers	7	2	5
Marginal workers: Others	14	11	3
Non-workers	819	395	424
