= Agwan =

Village in Maharashtra

- village
- Location in Maharashtra, India Agwan (India)
- Coordinates: 19.9417146°N 72.783597°E
- Country: India
- State: Maharashtra
- District: Palghar
- Taluka: Dahanu
- Elevation: 18 m (59 ft)

Population (2011)
  - Total: 3,993
- Time zone: UTC+5:30 (IST)
- 2011 census code: 551613

Agwan is a village in the Palghar district of Maharashtra, India. It is located in the Dahanu taluka.

== Demographics ==
According to the 2011 census of India, Agwan has 741 households. The effective literacy rate (i.e. the literacy rate of population excluding children aged 6 and below) is 57.29%.

Demographics (2011 Census)
	Total	Male	Female
Population	3993	2018	1975
Children aged below 6 years	619	323	296
Scheduled caste	1	0	1
Scheduled tribe	2914	1483	1431
Literates	1933	1150	783
Workers (all)	1688	997	691
Main workers (total)	1553	906	647
Main workers: Cultivators	57	35	22
Main workers: Agricultural labourers	1008	513	495
Main workers: Household industry workers	4	4	0
Main workers: Other	484	354	130
Marginal workers (total)	135	91	44
Marginal workers: Cultivators	12	7	5
Marginal workers: Agricultural labourers	70	42	28
Marginal workers: Household industry workers	1	1	0
Marginal workers: Others	52	41	11
Non-workers	2305	1021	1284
