= Bavade =

Village in Maharashtra

- village
- Location in Maharashtra, India Bavade (India)
- Coordinates: 19.8751547°N 72.7188438°E
- Country: India
- State: Maharashtra
- District: Palghar
- Taluka: Dahanu
- Elevation: 14 m (46 ft)

Population (2011)
  - Total: 1,523
- Time zone: UTC+5:30 (IST)
- 2011 census code: 551730

Bavade is a village in the Palghar district of Maharashtra, India. It is located in the Dahanu taluka.

== Demographics ==
According to the 2011 census of India, Bavade has 363 households. The effective literacy rate (i.e. the literacy rate of population excluding children aged 6 and below) is 75.53%.

Demographics (2011 Census)
	Total	Male	Female
Population	1523	745	778
Children aged below 6 years	195	100	95
Scheduled caste	129	59	70
Scheduled tribe	1018	491	527
Literates	1003	528	475
Workers (all)	748	443	305
Main workers (total)	533	324	209
Main workers: Cultivators	76	72	4
Main workers: Agricultural labourers	333	162	171
Main workers: Household industry workers	0	0	0
Main workers: Other	124	90	34
Marginal workers (total)	215	119	96
Marginal workers: Cultivators	45	24	21
Marginal workers: Agricultural labourers	143	77	66
Marginal workers: Household industry workers	15	10	5
Marginal workers: Others	12	8	4
Non-workers	775	302	473
