= Vyahali =

Village in Maharashtra

- village
- Location in Maharashtra, India Vyahali (India)
- Coordinates: 20.0396715°N 73.0464309°E
- Country: India
- State: Maharashtra
- District: Palghar
- Taluka: Dahanu
- Elevation: 207 m (679 ft)

Population (2011)
  - Total: 517
- Time zone: UTC+5:30 (IST)
- 2011 census code: 551635

Vyahali is a village in the Palghar district of Maharashtra, India. It is located in the Dahanu taluka.

== Demographics ==
According to the 2011 census of India, Vyahali has 83 households. The effective literacy rate (i.e. the literacy rate of population excluding children aged 6 and below) is 21.54%.

Demographics (2011 Census)
	Total	Male	Female
Population	517	250	267
Children aged below 6 years	127	55	72
Scheduled caste	0	0	0
Scheduled tribe	517	250	267
Literates	84	68	16
Workers (all)	300	150	150
Main workers (total)	297	148	149
Main workers: Cultivators	294	145	149
Main workers: Agricultural labourers	0	0	0
Main workers: Household industry workers	0	0	0
Main workers: Other	3	3	0
Marginal workers (total)	3	2	1
Marginal workers: Cultivators	3	2	1
Marginal workers: Agricultural labourers	0	0	0
Marginal workers: Household industry workers	0	0	0
Marginal workers: Others	0	0	0
Non-workers	217	100	117
