= Dhumket =

Village in Maharashtra

Dhumket Dhumkhet
- village
- Location in Maharashtra, India Dhumket (India)
- Coordinates: 19.9525096°N 72.718583°E
- Country: India
- State: Maharashtra
- District: Palghar
- Taluka: Dahanu
- Elevation: 9 m (30 ft)

Population (2011)
  - Total: 2,097
- Time zone: UTC+5:30 (IST)
- 2011 census code: 551716

Dhumket is a village in the Palghar district of Maharashtra, India. It is located in the Dahanu taluka.

== Demographics ==
According to the 2011 census of India, Dhumket has 427 households. The effective literacy rate (i.e. the literacy rate of population excluding children aged 6 and below) is 69.36%.

Demographics (2011 Census)
	Total	Male	Female
Population	2097	1009	1088
Children aged below 6 years	201	97	104
Scheduled caste	0	0	0
Scheduled tribe	50	26	24
Literates	1315	750	565
Workers (all)	841	451	390
Main workers (total)	518	266	252
Main workers: Cultivators	40	24	16
Main workers: Agricultural labourers	29	12	17
Main workers: Household industry workers	26	23	3
Main workers: Other	423	207	216
Marginal workers (total)	323	185	138
Marginal workers: Cultivators	61	35	26
Marginal workers: Agricultural labourers	75	33	42
Marginal workers: Household industry workers	25	15	10
Marginal workers: Others	162	102	60
Non-workers	1256	558	698
