= Shilonde =

Village in Maharashtra

- village
- Location in Maharashtra, India Shilonde (India)
- Coordinates: 20.0854698°N 73.0139616°E
- Country: India
- State: Maharashtra
- District: Palghar
- Taluka: Dahanu
- Elevation: 76 m (249 ft)

Population (2011)
  - Total: 2,512
- Time zone: UTC+5:30 (IST)
- ISO 3166 code: IN-MH
- 2011 census code: 551627

Shilonde is a village in the Palghar district of Maharashtra, India. It is located in the Dahanu taluka.

== Demographics ==
According to the 2011 census of India, Shilonde has 424 households. The effective literacy rate (i.e. the literacy rate of population excluding children aged 6 and below) is 27.94%.

Demographics (2011 Census)
	Total	Male	Female
Population	2512	1224	1288
Children aged below 6 years	536	269	267
Scheduled caste	0	0	0
Scheduled tribe	2504	1222	1282
Literates	552	363	189
Workers (all)	1371	678	693
Main workers (total)	1000	578	422
Main workers: Cultivators	635	359	276
Main workers: Agricultural labourers	347	211	136
Main workers: Household industry workers	6	4	2
Main workers: Other	12	4	8
Marginal workers (total)	371	100	271
Marginal workers: Cultivators	94	27	67
Marginal workers: Agricultural labourers	165	60	105
Marginal workers: Household industry workers	85	2	83
Marginal workers: Others	27	11	16
Non-workers	1141	546	595
