= Aswali =

Village in Maharashtra, India

- village
- Location in Maharashtra, India Aswali (India)
- Coordinates: 20.0925931°N 72.7954159°E
- Country: India
- State: Maharashtra
- District: Palghar
- Taluka: Dahanu
- Elevation: 45 m (148 ft)

Population (2011)
  - Total: 2,165
- Time zone: UTC+5:30 (IST)
- 2011 census code: 551580

Aswali is a village in the Palghar district of Maharashtra, India. It is located in the Dahanu taluka.

== Demographics ==
According to the 2011 census of India, Aswali has 384 households. The effective literacy rate (i.e. the literacy rate of population excluding children aged 6 and below) is 27.97%.

Demographics (2011 Census)
	Total	Male	Female
Population	2165	1039	1126
Children aged below 6 years	424	188	236
Scheduled caste	5	5	0
Scheduled tribe	2153	1032	1121
Literates	487	295	192
Workers (all)	1238	626	612
Main workers (total)	1128	580	548
Main workers: Cultivators	450	228	222
Main workers: Agricultural labourers	567	294	273
Main workers: Household industry workers	34	1	33
Main workers: Other	77	57	20
Marginal workers (total)	110	46	64
Marginal workers: Cultivators	42	18	24
Marginal workers: Agricultural labourers	36	14	22
Marginal workers: Household industry workers	21	8	13
Marginal workers: Others	11	6	5
Non-workers	927	413	514
