= Gungavada =

Village in Maharashtra

Gungavada Gungwada
- village
- Location in Maharashtra, India Gungavada (India)
- Coordinates: 19.9543168°N 72.6934594°E
- Country: India
- State: Maharashtra
- District: Palghar
- Taluka: Dahanu
- Elevation: 11 m (36 ft)

Population (2011)
  - Total: 1,328
- Time zone: UTC+5:30 (IST)
- 2011 census code: 551718

Gungavada is a village in the Palghar district of Maharashtra, India. It is located in the Dahanu taluka.

== Demographics ==
According to the 2011 census of India, Gungavada has 303 households. The effective literacy rate (i.e. the literacy rate of population excluding children aged 6 and below) is 92.45%.

Demographics (2011 Census)
	Total	Male	Female
Population	1328	662	666
Children aged below 6 years	110	61	49
Scheduled caste	0	0	0
Scheduled tribe	36	19	17
Literates	1126	573	553
Workers (all)	468	380	88
Main workers (total)	464	379	85
Main workers: Cultivators	47	33	14
Main workers: Agricultural labourers	32	20	12
Main workers: Household industry workers	127	121	6
Main workers: Other	258	205	53
Marginal workers (total)	4	1	3
Marginal workers: Cultivators	0	0	0
Marginal workers: Agricultural labourers	2	1	1
Marginal workers: Household industry workers	1	0	1
Marginal workers: Others	1	0	1
Non-workers	860	282	578
