= Khubale =

Village in Maharashtra

- village
- Location in Maharashtra, India Khubale (India)
- Coordinates: 20.0784743°N 72.9431038°E
- Country: India
- State: Maharashtra
- District: Palghar
- Taluka: Dahanu
- Elevation: 85 m (279 ft)

Population (2011)
  - Total: 913
- Time zone: UTC+5:30 (IST)
- 2011 census code: 551623

Khubale is a village in the Palghar district of Maharashtra, India. It is located in the Dahanu taluka. The Kurze Dam Reservoir is located nearby.

== Demographics ==
According to the 2011 census of India, Khubale has 149 households. The effective literacy rate (i.e. the literacy rate of population excluding children aged 6 and below) is 56.69%.

Demographics (2011 Census)
	Total	Male	Female
Population	913	440	473
Children aged below 6 years	188	93	95
Scheduled caste	0	0	0
Scheduled tribe	912	440	472
Literates	411	244	167
Workers (all)	224	206	18
Main workers (total)	32	30	2
Main workers: Cultivators	2	2	0
Main workers: Agricultural labourers	24	22	2
Main workers: Household industry workers	0	0	0
Main workers: Other	6	6	0
Marginal workers (total)	192	176	16
Marginal workers: Cultivators	3	3	0
Marginal workers: Agricultural labourers	184	170	14
Marginal workers: Household industry workers	0	0	0
Marginal workers: Others	5	3	2
Non-workers	689	234	455
