= Varkhande =

Village in Maharashtra

Varkhande Varkhanda
- village
- Location in Maharashtra, India Varkhande (India)
- Coordinates: 20.0830669°N 72.9312921°E
- Country: India
- State: Maharashtra
- District: Palghar
- Taluka: Dahanu
- Elevation: 70 m (230 ft)

Population (2011)
  - Total: 1,041
- Time zone: UTC+5:30 (IST)
- 2011 census code: 551622

Varkhande is a village in the Palghar district of Maharashtra, India. It is located in the Dahanu taluka.

== Demographics ==
According to the 2011 census of India, Varkhanda has 195 households. The effective literacy rate (i.e. the literacy rate of population excluding children aged 6 and below) is 79.67%.

Demographics (2011 Census)
	Total	Male	Female
Population	1041	513	528
Children aged below 6 years	82	45	37
Scheduled caste	0	0	0
Scheduled tribe	1034	509	525
Literates	764	422	342
Workers (all)	335	249	86
Main workers (total)	285	214	71
Main workers: Cultivators	130	120	10
Main workers: Agricultural labourers	27	14	13
Main workers: Household industry workers	1	1	0
Main workers: Other	127	79	48
Marginal workers (total)	50	35	15
Marginal workers: Cultivators	18	14	4
Marginal workers: Agricultural labourers	9	4	5
Marginal workers: Household industry workers	0	0	0
Marginal workers: Others	23	17	6
Non-workers	706	264	442
