= Chari Tarf Kotebi =

Village in Maharashtra

- village
- Location in Maharashtra, India Chari Tarf Kotebi (India)
- Coordinates: 19.9486455°N 72.7954159°E
- Country: India
- State: Maharashtra
- District: Palghar
- Taluka: Dahanu
- Elevation: 18 m (59 ft)

Population (2011)
  - Total: 1,927
- Time zone: UTC+5:30 (IST)
- 2011 census code: 551612

Chari Tarf Kotebi is a village in the Palghar district of Maharashtra, India. It is located in the Dahanu taluka.

== Demographics ==
According to the 2011 census of India, Chari Tarf Kotebi has 387 households. The effective literacy rate (i.e. the literacy rate of population excluding children aged 6 and below) is 47.05%.

Demographics (2011 Census)
	Total	Male	Female
Population	1927	941	986
Children aged below 6 years	316	151	165
Scheduled caste	0	0	0
Scheduled tribe	1884	916	968
Literates	758	476	282
Workers (all)	1094	575	519
Main workers (total)	817	504	313
Main workers: Cultivators	252	172	80
Main workers: Agricultural labourers	357	193	164
Main workers: Household industry workers	15	7	8
Main workers: Other	193	132	61
Marginal workers (total)	277	71	206
Marginal workers: Cultivators	11	8	3
Marginal workers: Agricultural labourers	223	48	175
Marginal workers: Household industry workers	12	0	12
Marginal workers: Others	31	15	16
Non-workers	833	366	467
