= Diwashi =

Village in Maharashtra

- village
- Location in Maharashtra, India Diwashi (India)
- Coordinates: 20.0814829°N 73.0907°E
- Country: India
- State: Maharashtra
- District: Palghar
- Taluka: Dahanu
- Elevation: 121 m (397 ft)

Population (2011)
  - Total: 1,380
- Time zone: UTC+5:30 (IST)
- 2011 census code: 551630

Diwashi is a village in the Palghar district of Maharashtra, India. It is located in the Dahanu taluka.

== Demographics ==
According to the 2011 census of India, Diwashi has 318 households. The effective literacy rate (i.e. the literacy rate of population excluding children aged 6 and below) is 19.72%.

Demographics (2011 Census)
	Total	Male	Female
Population	1380	620	760
Children aged below 6 years	366	191	175
Scheduled caste	0	0	0
Scheduled tribe	1380	620	760
Literates	200	104	96
Workers (all)	753	317	436
Main workers (total)	292	134	158
Main workers: Cultivators	187	106	81
Main workers: Agricultural labourers	82	15	67
Main workers: Household industry workers	7	3	4
Main workers: Other	16	10	6
Marginal workers (total)	461	183	278
Marginal workers: Cultivators	391	158	233
Marginal workers: Agricultural labourers	48	16	32
Marginal workers: Household industry workers	11	5	6
Marginal workers: Others	11	4	7
Non-workers	627	303	324
