= Ambiste =

Village in Maharashtra

- village
- Location in Maharashtra, India Ambiste (India)
- Coordinates: 19.856616°N 72.8545019°E
- Country: India
- State: Maharashtra
- District: Palghar
- Taluka: Dahanu
- Elevation: 30 m (98 ft)

Population (2011)
  - Total: 632
- Time zone: UTC+5:30 (IST)
- 2011 census code: 551702

Ambiste is a village in the Palghar district of Maharashtra, India. It is located in the Dahanu taluka.

== Demographics ==
According to the 2011 census of India, Ambiste has 136 households. The effective literacy rate (i.e. the literacy rate of population excluding children aged 6 and below) is 52.21%.

Demographics (2011 Census)
	Total	Male	Female
Population	632	278	354
Children aged below 6 years	134	55	79
Scheduled caste	0	0	0
Scheduled tribe	632	278	354
Literates	260	155	105
Workers (all)	392	179	213
Main workers (total)	291	136	155
Main workers: Cultivators	210	100	110
Main workers: Agricultural labourers	53	23	30
Main workers: Household industry workers	0	0	0
Main workers: Other	28	13	15
Marginal workers (total)	101	43	58
Marginal workers: Cultivators	43	21	22
Marginal workers: Agricultural labourers	49	19	30
Marginal workers: Household industry workers	2	1	1
Marginal workers: Others	7	2	5
Non-workers	240	99	141
