= Kalamdevi =

Village in Maharashtra

- village
- Location in Maharashtra, India Kalamdevi (India)
- Coordinates: 20.0785429°N 73.0021534°E
- Country: India
- State: Maharashtra
- District: Palghar
- Taluka: Dahanu
- Elevation: 127 m (417 ft)

Population (2011)
  - Total: 1,582
- Time zone: UTC+5:30 (IST)
- 2011 census code: 551626

Kalamdevi is a village in the Palghar district of Maharashtra, India. It is located in the Dahanu taluka.

== Demographics ==
According to the 2011 census of India, Kalamdevi has 214 households. The effective literacy rate (i.e. the literacy rate of population excluding children aged 6 and below) is 63.49%.

Demographics (2011 Census)
	Total	Male	Female
Population	1582	838	744
Children aged below 6 years	199	106	93
Scheduled caste	13	8	5
Scheduled tribe	1540	816	724
Literates	878	539	339
Workers (all)	728	379	349
Main workers (total)	629	309	320
Main workers: Cultivators	549	249	300
Main workers: Agricultural labourers	11	6	5
Main workers: Household industry workers	5	3	2
Main workers: Other	64	51	13
Marginal workers (total)	99	70	29
Marginal workers: Cultivators	67	43	24
Marginal workers: Agricultural labourers	29	25	4
Marginal workers: Household industry workers	0	0	0
Marginal workers: Others	3	2	1
Non-workers	854	459	395
