= Ashte, Dahanu =

Village in Maharashtra

Ashte
- village
- Location in Maharashtra, India Ashte (India)
- Coordinates: 20.0338677°N 72.9873924°E
- Country: India
- State: Maharashtra
- District: Palghar
- Taluka: Dahanu
- Elevation: 159 m (522 ft)

Population (2011)
  - Total: 1,075
- Time zone: UTC+5:30 (IST)
- 2011 census code: 551657

Ashte is a village in the Palghar district of Maharashtra, India. It is located in the Dahanu taluka.

== Demographics ==
According to the 2011 census of India, Ashte has 245 households. The effective literacy rate (i.e. the literacy rate of population excluding children aged 6 and below) is 50.47%.

Demographics (2011 Census)
	Total	Male	Female
Population	1075	525	550
Children aged below 6 years	221	105	116
Scheduled caste	0	0	0
Scheduled tribe	1071	522	549
Literates	431	301	130
Workers (all)	721	346	375
Main workers (total)	69	52	17
Main workers: Cultivators	3	1	2
Main workers: Agricultural labourers	10	5	5
Main workers: Household industry workers	0	0	0
Main workers: Other	56	46	10
Marginal workers (total)	652	294	358
Marginal workers: Cultivators	458	212	246
Marginal workers: Agricultural labourers	192	81	111
Marginal workers: Household industry workers	0	0	0
Marginal workers: Others	2	1	1
Non-workers	354	179	175
