= Ganeshbag =

Village in Maharashtra

- village
- Location in Maharashtra, India Ganeshbag (India)
- Coordinates: 19.9792925°N 72.8722249°E
- Country: India
- State: Maharashtra
- District: Palghar
- Taluka: Dahanu
- Elevation: 212 m (696 ft)

Population (2011)
  - Total: 1,365
- Time zone: UTC+5:30 (IST)
- ISO 3166 code: IN-MH
- 2011 census code: 551673

Ganeshbag is a village in the Palghar district of Maharashtra, India. It is located in the Dahanu taluka.

== Demographics ==
According to the 2011 census of India, Ganeshbag has 226 households. The effective literacy rate (i.e. the literacy rate of population excluding children aged 6 and below) is 33.73%.

Demographics (2011 Census)
	Total	Male	Female
Population	1365	673	692
Children aged below 6 years	283	131	152
Scheduled caste	4	4	0
Scheduled tribe	1352	665	687
Literates	365	265	100
Workers (all)	759	365	394
Main workers (total)	377	197	180
Main workers: Cultivators	45	29	16
Main workers: Agricultural labourers	297	149	148
Main workers: Household industry workers	2	1	1
Main workers: Other	33	18	15
Marginal workers (total)	382	168	214
Marginal workers: Cultivators	106	52	54
Marginal workers: Agricultural labourers	239	98	141
Marginal workers: Household industry workers	25	11	14
Marginal workers: Others	12	7	5
Non-workers	606	308	298
