= Naruli =

Village in Maharashtra

Naroli
- village
- Location in Maharashtra, India Naroli (India)
- Coordinates: 20.0151514°N 73.0021534°E
- Country: India
- State: Maharashtra
- District: Palghar
- Taluka: Dahanu
- Elevation: 205 m (673 ft)

Population (2011)
  - Total: 1,398
- Time zone: UTC+5:30 (IST)
- 2011 census code: 551658

Naruli is a village in the Palghar district of Maharashtra, India. It is located in the Dahanu taluka.

== Demographics ==
According to the 2011 census of India, Naruli has 263 households. The effective literacy rate (i.e. the literacy rate of population excluding children aged 6 and below) is 27.17%.

Demographics (2011 Census)
	Total	Male	Female
Population	1398	643	755
Children aged below 6 years	338	152	186
Scheduled caste	0	0	0
Scheduled tribe	1392	638	754
Literates	288	184	104
Workers (all)	745	348	397
Main workers (total)	527	289	238
Main workers: Cultivators	409	212	197
Main workers: Agricultural labourers	75	41	34
Main workers: Household industry workers	0	0	0
Main workers: Other	43	36	7
Marginal workers (total)	218	59	159
Marginal workers: Cultivators	107	26	81
Marginal workers: Agricultural labourers	86	19	67
Marginal workers: Household industry workers	4	3	1
Marginal workers: Others	21	11	10
Non-workers	653	295	358
