= Halapada =

Village in Maharashtra

Halapada Haladpada
- village
- Location in Maharashtra, India Halapada (India)
- Coordinates: 20.0505399°N 72.9294558°E
- Country: India
- State: Maharashtra
- District: Palghar
- Taluka: Dahanu
- Elevation: 84 m (276 ft)

Population (2011)
  - Total: 3,582
- Time zone: UTC+5:30 (IST)
- PIN code: 401606
- 2011 census code: 551639

Halapada is a village in the Palghar district of Maharashtra, India. It is located in the Dahanu taluka.

== Demographics ==
According to the 2011 census of India, Halapada has 663 households. The effective literacy rate (i.e. the literacy rate of population excluding children aged 6 and below) is 43.74%.

Demographics (2011 Census)
	Total	Male	Female
Population	3582	1791	1791
Children aged below 6 years	729	390	339
Scheduled caste	0	0	0
Scheduled tribe	3540	1763	1777
Literates	1248	784	464
Workers (all)	1730	954	776
Main workers (total)	1169	676	493
Main workers: Cultivators	634	379	255
Main workers: Agricultural labourers	320	126	194
Main workers: Household industry workers	13	11	2
Main workers: Other	202	160	42
Marginal workers (total)	561	278	283
Marginal workers: Cultivators	227	60	167
Marginal workers: Agricultural labourers	84	32	52
Marginal workers: Household industry workers	7	5	2
Marginal workers: Others	243	181	62
Non-workers	1852	837	1015
