= Dhaniwari =

Village in Maharashtra

- village
- Location in Maharashtra, India Dhaniwari (India)
- Coordinates: 19.978202°N 72.9194798°E
- Country: India
- State: Maharashtra
- District: Palghar
- Taluka: Dahanu
- Elevation: 76 m (249 ft)

Population (2011)
  - Total: 1,390
- Time zone: UTC+5:30 (IST)
- 2011 census code: 551676

Dhaniwari is a village in the Palghar district of Maharashtra, India. It is located in the Dahanu taluka.

== Demographics ==
According to the 2011 census of India, Dhaniwari has 303 households. The effective literacy rate (i.e. the literacy rate of population excluding children aged 6 and below) is 33.82%.

Demographics (2011 Census)
| | Total | Male | Female |
|---|---|---|---|
| Population | 1390 | 655 | 735 |
| Children aged below 6 years | 237 | 121 | 116 |
| Scheduled caste | 0 | 0 | 0 |
| Scheduled tribe | 1389 | 654 | 735 |
| Literates | 390 | 235 | 155 |
| Workers (all) | 693 | 330 | 363 |
| Main workers (total) | 680 | 328 | 352 |
| Main workers: Cultivators | 493 | 257 | 236 |
| Main workers: Agricultural labourers | 162 | 60 | 102 |
| Main workers: Household industry workers | 4 | 4 | 0 |
| Main workers: Other | 21 | 7 | 14 |
| Marginal workers (total) | 13 | 2 | 11 |
| Marginal workers: Cultivators | 5 | 2 | 3 |
| Marginal workers: Agricultural labourers | 8 | 0 | 8 |
| Marginal workers: Household industry workers | 0 | 0 | 0 |
| Marginal workers: Others | 0 | 0 | 0 |
| Non-workers | 697 | 325 | 372 |
