= Khunavade =

Village in Maharashtra

- village
- Location in Maharashtra, India Khunavade (India)
- Coordinates: 20.0727332°N 72.7983705°E
- Country: India
- State: Maharashtra
- District: Palghar
- Taluka: Dahanu
- Elevation: 56 m (184 ft)

Population (2011)
  - Total: 1,636
- Time zone: UTC+5:30 (IST)
- 2011 census code: 551581

Khunavade is a village in the Palghar district of Maharashtra, India. It is located in the Dahanu taluka.

== Demographics ==
According to the 2011 census of India, Khunavade has 339 households. The effective literacy rate (i.e. the literacy rate of population excluding children aged 6 and below) is 33.88%.

Demographics (2011 Census)
	Total	Male	Female
Population	1636	793	843
Children aged below 6 years	361	194	167
Scheduled caste	0	0	0
Scheduled tribe	1608	778	830
Literates	432	242	190
Workers (all)	769	393	376
Main workers (total)	745	383	362
Main workers: Cultivators	45	24	21
Main workers: Agricultural labourers	648	325	323
Main workers: Household industry workers	1	1	0
Main workers: Other	51	33	18
Marginal workers (total)	24	10	14
Marginal workers: Cultivators	11	2	9
Marginal workers: Agricultural labourers	12	8	4
Marginal workers: Household industry workers	0	0	0
Marginal workers: Others	1	0	1
Non-workers	867	400	467
