= Navnath, Dahanu =

Village in Maharashtra

Navnath
- village
- Location in Maharashtra, India Navnath (India)
- Coordinates: 19.9516644°N 72.8840395°E
- Country: India
- State: Maharashtra
- District: Palghar
- Taluka: Dahanu
- Elevation: 53 m (174 ft)

Population (2011)
  - Total: 1,751
- Time zone: UTC+5:30 (IST)
- 2011 census code: 551684

Navnath is a village in the Palghar district of Maharashtra, India. It is located in the Dahanu taluka.

== Demographics ==
According to the 2011 census of India, Navnath has 354 households. The effective literacy rate (i.e. the literacy rate of population excluding children aged 6 and below) is 34.94%.

Demographics (2011 Census)
	Total	Male	Female
Population	1751	821	930
Children aged below 6 years	320	159	161
Scheduled caste	3	1	2
Scheduled tribe	1522	697	825
Literates	500	320	180
Workers (all)	775	369	406
Main workers (total)	731	358	373
Main workers: Cultivators	413	184	229
Main workers: Agricultural labourers	196	90	106
Main workers: Household industry workers	9	6	3
Main workers: Other	113	78	35
Marginal workers (total)	44	11	33
Marginal workers: Cultivators	7	1	6
Marginal workers: Agricultural labourers	10	1	9
Marginal workers: Household industry workers	5	2	3
Marginal workers: Others	22	7	15
Non-workers	976	452	524
