= Alkapur =

Village in Maharashtra

- village
- Location in Maharashtra, India Alkapur (India)
- Coordinates: 20.0244109°N 73.0966019°E
- Country: India
- State: Maharashtra
- District: Palghar
- Taluka: Dahanu
- Elevation: 391 m (1,283 ft)

Population (2011)
  - Total: 1,195
- Time zone: UTC+5:30 (IST)
- 2011 census code: 551633

Alkapur is a village in the Palghar district of Maharashtra, India. It is located in the Dahanu taluka.

== Demographics ==
According to the 2011 census of India, Alkapur has 223 households. The effective literacy rate (i.e. the literacy rate of population excluding children aged 6 and below) is 33.54%.

Demographics (2011 Census)
	Total	Male	Female
Population	1195	581	614
Children aged below 6 years	244	120	124
Scheduled caste	0	0	0
Scheduled tribe	1189	579	610
Literates	319	181	138
Workers (all)	705	354	351
Main workers (total)	407	315	92
Main workers: Cultivators	303	243	60
Main workers: Agricultural labourers	94	65	29
Main workers: Household industry workers	1	1	0
Main workers: Other	9	6	3
Marginal workers (total)	298	39	259
Marginal workers: Cultivators	121	16	105
Marginal workers: Agricultural labourers	176	23	153
Marginal workers: Household industry workers	0	0	0
Marginal workers: Others	1	0	1
Non-workers	490	227	263
