= Gangangaon =

Village in Maharashtra

- village
- Location in Maharashtra, India Gangangaon (India)
- Coordinates: 20.0428875°N 72.8456399°E
- Country: India
- State: Maharashtra
- District: Palghar
- Taluka: Dahanu
- Elevation: 74 m (243 ft)

Population (2011)
  - Total: 3,224
- Time zone: UTC+5:30 (IST)
- 2011 census code: 551646

Gangangaon is a village in the Palghar district of Maharashtra, India. It is located in the Dahanu taluka.

== Demographics ==
According to the 2011 census of India, Gangangaon has 561 households. The effective literacy rate (i.e. the literacy rate of population excluding children aged 6 and below) is 46.2%.

Demographics (2011 Census)
	Total	Male	Female
Population	3224	1538	1686
Children aged below 6 years	525	266	259
Scheduled caste	0	0	0
Scheduled tribe	3202	1524	1678
Literates	1247	736	511
Workers (all)	1633	780	853
Main workers (total)	608	340	268
Main workers: Cultivators	454	251	203
Main workers: Agricultural labourers	72	23	49
Main workers: Household industry workers	5	5	0
Main workers: Other	77	61	16
Marginal workers (total)	1025	440	585
Marginal workers: Cultivators	430	231	199
Marginal workers: Agricultural labourers	578	199	379
Marginal workers: Household industry workers	0	0	0
Marginal workers: Others	17	10	7
Non-workers	1591	758	833
