= Kolavali =

Village in Maharashtra

- village
- Location in Maharashtra, India Kolavali (India)
- Coordinates: 19.8667724°N 72.724494°E
- Country: India
- State: Maharashtra
- District: Palghar
- Taluka: Dahanu
- Elevation: 13 m (43 ft)

Population (2011)
  - Total: 2,048
- Time zone: UTC+5:30 (IST)
- 2011 census code: 551740

Kolavali is a village in the Palghar district of Maharashtra, India. It is located in the Dahanu taluka.

== Demographics ==
According to the 2011 census of India, Kolavali has 486 households. The effective literacy rate (i.e. the literacy rate of population excluding children aged 6 and below) is 84.91%.

Demographics (2011 Census)
	Total	Male	Female
Population	2048	1012	1036
Children aged below 6 years	226	116	110
Scheduled caste	105	53	52
Scheduled tribe	637	306	331
Literates	1547	821	726
Workers (all)	961	664	297
Main workers (total)	942	653	289
Main workers: Cultivators	168	141	27
Main workers: Agricultural labourers	354	197	157
Main workers: Household industry workers	24	22	2
Main workers: Other	396	293	103
Marginal workers (total)	19	11	8
Marginal workers: Cultivators	1	0	1
Marginal workers: Agricultural labourers	5	4	1
Marginal workers: Household industry workers	1	0	1
Marginal workers: Others	12	7	5
Non-workers	1087	348	739
