= Pimpalshet Khurd =

Village in Maharashtra

Pimpalshet Khurd Pimpalshet Kh.
- village
- Location in Maharashtra, India Pimpalshet Khurd (India)
- Coordinates: 19.9217031°N 72.8722249°E
- Country: India
- State: Maharashtra
- District: Palghar
- Taluka: Dahanu
- Elevation: 64 m (210 ft)

Population (2011)
  - Total: 606
- Time zone: UTC+5:30 (IST)
- 2011 census code: 551689

Pimpalshet Khurd is a village in the Palghar district of Maharashtra, India. It is located in the Dahanu taluka.

== Demographics ==
According to the 2011 census of India, Pimpalshet Khurd has 128 households. The effective literacy rate (i.e. the literacy rate of population excluding children aged 6 and below) is 38.82%.

Demographics (2011 Census)
	Total	Male	Female
Population	606	290	316
Children aged below 6 years	96	49	47
Scheduled caste	0	0	0
Scheduled tribe	605	290	315
Literates	198	123	75
Workers (all)	309	152	157
Main workers (total)	168	115	53
Main workers: Cultivators	29	26	3
Main workers: Agricultural labourers	80	65	15
Main workers: Household industry workers	1	1	0
Main workers: Other	58	23	35
Marginal workers (total)	141	37	104
Marginal workers: Cultivators	20	6	14
Marginal workers: Agricultural labourers	96	22	74
Marginal workers: Household industry workers	1	0	1
Marginal workers: Others	24	9	15
Non-workers	297	138	159
