= Ghol =

Village in Maharashtra

- village
- Location in Maharashtra, India Ghol (India)
- Coordinates: 19.8909553°N 72.9401509°E
- Country: India
- State: Maharashtra
- District: Palghar
- Taluka: Dahanu
- Elevation: 47 m (154 ft)

Population (2011)
  - Total: 1,655
- Time zone: UTC+5:30 (IST)
- 2011 census code: 551709

Ghol is a village in the Palghar district of Maharashtra, India. It is located in the Dahanu taluka.

== Demographics ==
According to the 2011 census of India, Ghol has 312 households. The effective literacy rate (i.e. the literacy rate of population excluding children aged 6 and below) is 41.41%.

Demographics (2011 Census)
	Total	Male	Female
Population	1655	828	827
Children aged below 6 years	305	158	147
Scheduled caste	0	0	0
Scheduled tribe	1596	787	809
Literates	559	352	207
Workers (all)	898	455	443
Main workers (total)	629	380	249
Main workers: Cultivators	470	282	188
Main workers: Agricultural labourers	105	52	53
Main workers: Household industry workers	4	3	1
Main workers: Other	50	43	7
Marginal workers (total)	269	75	194
Marginal workers: Cultivators	219	58	161
Marginal workers: Agricultural labourers	13	3	10
Marginal workers: Household industry workers	4	0	4
Marginal workers: Others	33	14	19
Non-workers	757	373	384
