= Kainad =

Village in Maharashtra

- village
- Location in Maharashtra, India Kainad (India)
- Coordinates: 20.0485209°N 72.7865518°E
- Country: India
- State: Maharashtra
- District: Palghar
- Taluka: Dahanu
- Elevation: 61 m (200 ft)

Population (2011)
  - Total: 5,706
- Time zone: UTC+5:30 (IST)
- 2011 census code: 551593

Kainad is a village in the Palghar district of Maharashtra, India. It is located in the Dahanu taluka.

== Demographics ==
According to the 2011 census of India, Kainad has 1174 households. The effective literacy rate (i.e. the literacy rate of population excluding children aged 6 and below) is 41.93%.

Demographics (2011 Census)
	Total	Male	Female
Population	5706	2775	2931
Children aged below 6 years	1000	510	490
Scheduled caste	4	3	1
Scheduled tribe	5653	2743	2910
Literates	1973	1222	751
Workers (all)	2676	1459	1217
Main workers (total)	2027	1189	838
Main workers: Cultivators	341	188	153
Main workers: Agricultural labourers	922	511	411
Main workers: Household industry workers	46	5	41
Main workers: Other	718	485	233
Marginal workers (total)	649	270	379
Marginal workers: Cultivators	81	28	53
Marginal workers: Agricultural labourers	406	155	251
Marginal workers: Household industry workers	2	0	2
Marginal workers: Others	160	87	73
Non-workers	3030	1316	1714
