= Sukad-Amba =

Village in Maharashtra

Sukad-Amba Sukhadamba, Sukadamba
- village
- Location in Maharashtra, India Sukad-Amba (India)
- Coordinates: 20.0304585°N 73.0700421°E
- Country: India
- State: Maharashtra
- District: Palghar
- Taluka: Dahanu

Population (2011)
  - Total: 1,811
- Time zone: UTC+5:30 (IST)
- 2011 census code: 551634

Sukad-Amba is a village in the Palghar district of Maharashtra, India. It is located in the Dahanu taluka.

== Demographics ==
According to the 2011 census of India, Sukad-Amba has 367 households. The effective literacy rate (i.e. the literacy rate of population excluding children aged 6 and below) is 21.77%.

Demographics (2011 Census)
	Total	Male	Female
Population	1811	858	953
Children aged below 6 years	442	209	233
Scheduled caste	1	1	0
Scheduled tribe	1806	857	949
Literates	298	191	107
Workers (all)	1107	527	580
Main workers (total)	784	391	393
Main workers: Cultivators	51	16	35
Main workers: Agricultural labourers	702	357	345
Main workers: Household industry workers	2	1	1
Main workers: Other	29	17	12
Marginal workers (total)	323	136	187
Marginal workers: Cultivators	122	41	81
Marginal workers: Agricultural labourers	192	93	99
Marginal workers: Household industry workers	1	0	1
Marginal workers: Others	8	2	6
Non-workers	704	331	373
