= Dabhon =

Village in Maharashtra

- village
- Location in Maharashtra, India Dabhon (India)
- Coordinates: 19.8753101°N 72.8397317°E
- Country: India
- State: Maharashtra
- District: Palghar
- Taluka: Dahanu
- Elevation: 30 m (98 ft)

Population (2011)
  - Total: 3,444
- Time zone: UTC+5:30 (IST)
- 2011 census code: 551701

Dabhon is a village in the Palghar district of Maharashtra, India. It is located in the Dahanu taluka.

== Demographics ==
According to the 2011 census of India, Dabhon has 670 households. The effective literacy rate (i.e. the literacy rate of population excluding children aged 6 and below) is 45.35%.

Demographics (2011 Census)
	Total	Male	Female
Population	3444	1742	1702
Children aged below 6 years	670	358	312
Scheduled caste	10	5	5
Scheduled tribe	3335	1684	1651
Literates	1258	813	445
Workers (all)	1757	920	837
Main workers (total)	1410	721	689
Main workers: Cultivators	670	351	319
Main workers: Agricultural labourers	577	282	295
Main workers: Household industry workers	27	11	16
Main workers: Other	136	77	59
Marginal workers (total)	347	199	148
Marginal workers: Cultivators	160	107	53
Marginal workers: Agricultural labourers	42	23	19
Marginal workers: Household industry workers	16	9	7
Marginal workers: Others	129	60	69
Non-workers	1687	822	865
