= Khaniv =

Village in Maharashtra

- village
- Location in Maharashtra, India Khaniv (India)
- Coordinates: 19.9477094°N 72.9608202°E
- Country: India
- State: Maharashtra
- District: Palghar
- Taluka: Dahanu
- Elevation: 72 m (236 ft)

Population (2011)
  - Total: 1,514
- Time zone: UTC+5:30 (IST)
- 2011 census code: 551680

Khaniv is a village in the Palghar district of Maharashtra, India. It is located in the Dahanu taluka.

== Demographics ==
According to the 2011 census of India, Khaniv has 287 households. The effective literacy rate (i.e. the literacy rate of population excluding children aged 6 and below) is 37.45%.

Demographics (2011 Census)
	Total	Male	Female
Population	1514	746	768
Children aged below 6 years	291	144	147
Scheduled caste	0	0	0
Scheduled tribe	1506	744	762
Literates	458	302	156
Workers (all)	746	387	359
Main workers (total)	427	228	199
Main workers: Cultivators	282	156	126
Main workers: Agricultural labourers	133	67	66
Main workers: Household industry workers	1	1	0
Main workers: Other	11	4	7
Marginal workers (total)	319	159	160
Marginal workers: Cultivators	259	135	124
Marginal workers: Agricultural labourers	33	13	20
Marginal workers: Household industry workers	1	0	1
Marginal workers: Others	26	11	15
Non-workers	768	359	409
