= Karanjvira =

Village in Maharashtra

- village
- Location in Maharashtra, India Karanjvira (India)
- Coordinates: 20.0145147°N 72.937198°E
- Country: India
- State: Maharashtra
- District: Palghar
- Taluka: Dahanu
- Elevation: 110 m (360 ft)

Population (2011)
  - Total: 1,213
- Time zone: UTC+5:30 (IST)
- ISO 3166 code: IN-MH
- 2011 census code: 551655

Karanjvira is a village in the Palghar district of Maharashtra, India. It is located in the Dahanu taluka.

== Demographics ==
According to the 2011 census of India, Karanjvira has 251 households. The effective literacy rate (i.e. the literacy rate of population excluding children aged 6 and below) is 51.21%.

Demographics (2011 Census)
	Total	Male	Female
Population	1213	599	614
Children aged below 6 years	260	141	119
Scheduled caste	0	0	0
Scheduled tribe	1191	583	608
Literates	488	299	189
Workers (all)	599	318	281
Main workers (total)	398	236	162
Main workers: Cultivators	249	142	107
Main workers: Agricultural labourers	42	27	15
Main workers: Household industry workers	0	0	0
Main workers: Other	107	67	40
Marginal workers (total)	201	82	119
Marginal workers: Cultivators	77	33	44
Marginal workers: Agricultural labourers	118	48	70
Marginal workers: Household industry workers	1	0	1
Marginal workers: Others	5	1	4
Non-workers	614	281	333
