= Asave =

Village in Maharashtra

- village
- Location in Maharashtra, India Asave (India)
- Coordinates: 19.9446474°N 72.8131432°E
- Country: India
- State: Maharashtra
- District: Palghar
- Taluka: Dahanu
- Elevation: 46 m (151 ft)

Population (2011)
  - Total: 1,841
- Time zone: UTC+5:30 (IST)
- 2011 census code: 551607

Asave is a village in the Palghar district of Maharashtra, India. It is located in the Dahanu taluka.

== Demographics ==
According to the 2011 census of India, Asave has 337 households. The effective literacy rate (i.e. the literacy rate of population excluding children aged 6 and below) is 50.3%.

Demographics (2011 Census)
	Total	Male	Female
Population	1841	953	888
Children aged below 6 years	328	167	161
Scheduled caste	3	3	0
Scheduled tribe	1343	681	662
Literates	761	475	286
Workers (all)	842	518	324
Main workers (total)	748	467	281
Main workers: Cultivators	157	69	88
Main workers: Agricultural labourers	118	61	57
Main workers: Household industry workers	15	4	11
Main workers: Other	458	333	125
Marginal workers (total)	94	51	43
Marginal workers: Cultivators	20	14	6
Marginal workers: Agricultural labourers	14	8	6
Marginal workers: Household industry workers	5	1	4
Marginal workers: Others	55	28	27
Non-workers	999	435	564
