= Kotabi =

Village in Maharashtra

- village
- Location in Maharashtra, India Kotabi (India)
- Coordinates: 19.9262034°N 72.8013252°E
- Country: India
- State: Maharashtra
- District: Palghar
- Taluka: Dahanu
- Elevation: 26 m (85 ft)

Population (2011)
  - Total: 1,507
- Time zone: UTC+5:30 (IST)
- 2011 census code: 551616

Kotabi is a village in the Palghar district of Maharashtra, India. It is located in the Dahanu taluka.

== Demographics ==
According to the 2011 census of India, Kotabi has 306 households. The effective literacy rate (i.e. the literacy rate of population excluding children aged 6 and below) is 55.22%.

Demographics (2011 Census)
	Total	Male	Female
Population	1507	747	760
Children aged below 6 years	299	153	146
Scheduled caste	0	0	0
Scheduled tribe	1487	737	750
Literates	667	386	281
Workers (all)	842	411	431
Main workers (total)	663	378	285
Main workers: Cultivators	110	58	52
Main workers: Agricultural labourers	411	229	182
Main workers: Household industry workers	8	3	5
Main workers: Other	134	88	46
Marginal workers (total)	179	33	146
Marginal workers: Cultivators	2	0	2
Marginal workers: Agricultural labourers	100	11	89
Marginal workers: Household industry workers	1	1	0
Marginal workers: Others	76	21	55
Non-workers	665	336	329
