= Nagzari =

Village in Maharashtra

- village
- Location in Maharashtra, India Nagzari (India)
- Coordinates: 19.7817735°N 72.8545019°E
- Country: India
- State: Maharashtra
- District: Palghar
- Taluka: Dahanu
- Elevation: 15 m (49 ft)

Population (2011)
  - Total: 3,720
- Time zone: UTC+5:30 (IST)
- 2011 census code: 551648

Nagzari is a village in the Palghar district of Maharashtra, India. It is located in the Dahanu taluka.

== Demographics ==
According to the 2011 census of India, Nagzari has 668 households. The effective literacy rate (i.e. the literacy rate of population excluding children aged 6 and below) is 43.3%.

Demographics (2011 Census)
	Total	Male	Female
Population	3720	1905	1815
Children aged below 6 years	681	347	334
Scheduled caste	12	4	8
Scheduled tribe	3688	1892	1796
Literates	1316	882	434
Workers (all)	1729	841	888
Main workers (total)	1295	715	580
Main workers: Cultivators	760	432	328
Main workers: Agricultural labourers	436	205	231
Main workers: Household industry workers	7	4	3
Main workers: Other	92	74	18
Marginal workers (total)	434	126	308
Marginal workers: Cultivators	140	17	123
Marginal workers: Agricultural labourers	268	95	173
Marginal workers: Household industry workers	4	1	3
Marginal workers: Others	22	13	9
Non-workers	1991	1064	927
