= Vankas =

Village in Maharashtra

- village
- Location in Maharashtra, India Vankas (India)
- Coordinates: 20.0694476°N 72.8810859°E
- Country: India
- State: Maharashtra
- District: Palghar
- Taluka: Dahanu
- Elevation: 55 m (180 ft)

Population (2011)
  - Total: 4,019
- Time zone: UTC+5:30 (IST)
- 2011 census code: 551620

Vankas is a village in the Palghar district of Maharashtra, India. It is located in the Dahanu taluka.

== Demographics ==
According to the 2011 census of India, Vankas has 713 households. The effective literacy rate (i.e. the literacy rate of population excluding children aged 6 and below) is 34.67%.

Demographics (2011 Census)
	Total	Male	Female
Population	4019	1903	2116
Children aged below 6 years	878	416	462
Scheduled caste	0	0	0
Scheduled tribe	4005	1900	2105
Literates	1089	709	380
Workers (all)	2072	964	1108
Main workers (total)	980	580	400
Main workers: Cultivators	466	276	190
Main workers: Agricultural labourers	238	104	134
Main workers: Household industry workers	12	9	3
Main workers: Other	264	191	73
Marginal workers (total)	1092	384	708
Marginal workers: Cultivators	281	146	135
Marginal workers: Agricultural labourers	759	213	546
Marginal workers: Household industry workers	5	0	5
Marginal workers: Others	47	25	22
Non-workers	1947	939	1008
