= Chandwad, Dahanu =

Village in Maharashtra

Chandwad
- village
- Location in Maharashtra, India Chandwad (India)
- Coordinates: 19.9366431°N 72.8485939°E
- Country: India
- State: Maharashtra
- District: Palghar
- Taluka: Dahanu
- Elevation: 49 m (161 ft)

Population (2011)
  - Total: 1,282
- Time zone: UTC+5:30 (IST)
- 2011 census code: 551686

Chandwad is a village in the Palghar district of Maharashtra, India. It is located in the Dahanu taluka.

== Demographics ==
According to the 2011 census of India, Chandwad has 243 households. The effective literacy rate (i.e. the literacy rate of population excluding children aged 6 and below) is 40.15%.

Demographics (2011 Census)
	Total	Male	Female
Population	1282	622	660
Children aged below 6 years	231	125	106
Scheduled caste	0	0	0
Scheduled tribe	1282	622	660
Literates	422	248	174
Workers (all)	723	351	372
Main workers (total)	643	309	334
Main workers: Cultivators	400	192	208
Main workers: Agricultural labourers	228	105	123
Main workers: Household industry workers	0	0	0
Main workers: Other	15	12	3
Marginal workers (total)	80	42	38
Marginal workers: Cultivators	22	12	10
Marginal workers: Agricultural labourers	54	27	27
Marginal workers: Household industry workers	2	2	0
Marginal workers: Others	2	1	1
Non-workers	559	271	288
