= Dhamatane =

Village in Maharashtra

- village
- Location in Maharashtra, India Dhamatane (India)
- Coordinates: 19.8771159°N 72.9165266°E
- Country: India
- State: Maharashtra
- District: Palghar
- Taluka: Dahanu
- Elevation: 40 m (130 ft)

Population (2011)
  - Total: 1,331
- Time zone: UTC+5:30 (IST)
- 2011 census code: 551712

Dhamatane is a village in the Palghar district of Maharashtra, India. It is located in the Dahanu taluka.

== Demographics ==
According to the 2011 census of India, Dhamatane has 285 households. The effective literacy rate (i.e. the literacy rate of population excluding children aged 6 and below) is 45.25%.

Demographics (2011 Census)
	Total	Male	Female
Population	1331	644	687
Children aged below 6 years	257	134	123
Scheduled caste	0	0	0
Scheduled tribe	1303	629	674
Literates	486	288	198
Workers (all)	882	409	473
Main workers (total)	559	263	296
Main workers: Cultivators	267	122	145
Main workers: Agricultural labourers	24	9	15
Main workers: Household industry workers	70	34	36
Main workers: Other	198	98	100
Marginal workers (total)	323	146	177
Marginal workers: Cultivators	262	116	146
Marginal workers: Agricultural labourers	37	21	16
Marginal workers: Household industry workers	7	2	5
Marginal workers: Others	17	7	10
Non-workers	449	235	214
