= Chimbave =

Village in Maharashtra, India

- village
- Location in Maharashtra, India Chimbave (India)
- Coordinates: 20.0511412°N 72.7407488°E
- Country: India
- State: Maharashtra
- District: Palghar
- Taluka: Dahanu
- Elevation: 21 m (69 ft)

Population (2011)
  - Total: 1,339
- Time zone: UTC+5:30 (IST)
- ISO 3166 code: IN-MH
- 2011 census code: 551587

Chimbave is a village in the Palghar district of Maharashtra, India. It is located in the Dahanu taluka.

== Demographics ==
According to the 2011 census of India, Chimbave has 280 households. The effective literacy rate (i.e. the literacy rate of population excluding children aged 6 and below) is 61.64%.

Demographics (2011 Census)
	Total	Male	Female
Population	1339	664	675
Children aged below 6 years	231	110	121
Scheduled caste	0	0	0
Scheduled tribe	1318	654	664
Literates	683	417	266
Workers (all)	718	367	351
Main workers (total)	651	340	311
Main workers: Cultivators	76	39	37
Main workers: Agricultural labourers	358	199	159
Main workers: Household industry workers	0	0	0
Main workers: Other	217	102	115
Marginal workers (total)	67	27	40
Marginal workers: Cultivators	10	2	8
Marginal workers: Agricultural labourers	43	25	18
Marginal workers: Household industry workers	1	0	1
Marginal workers: Others	13	0	13
Non-workers	621	297	324
