= Chandigaon =

Village in Maharashtra

- village
- Location in Maharashtra, India Chandigaon (India)
- Coordinates: 19.928646°N 72.720162°E
- Country: India
- State: Maharashtra
- District: Palghar
- Taluka: Dahanu
- Elevation: 14 m (46 ft)

Population (2011)
  - Total: 1,293
- Time zone: UTC+5:30 (IST)
- 2011 census code: 551720

Chandigaon is a village in the Palghar district of Maharashtra, India. It is located in the Dahanu taluka.

== Demographics ==
According to the 2011 census of India, Chandigaon has 302 households. The effective literacy rate (i.e. the literacy rate of population excluding children aged 6 and below) is 75.98%.

Demographics (2011 Census)
	Total	Male	Female
Population	1293	612	681
Children aged below 6 years	123	63	60
Scheduled caste	49	23	26
Scheduled tribe	9	7	2
Literates	889	474	415
Workers (all)	447	318	129
Main workers (total)	270	217	53
Main workers: Cultivators	53	46	7
Main workers: Agricultural labourers	105	93	12
Main workers: Household industry workers	19	16	3
Main workers: Other	93	62	31
Marginal workers (total)	177	101	76
Marginal workers: Cultivators	26	14	12
Marginal workers: Agricultural labourers	90	51	39
Marginal workers: Household industry workers	6	3	3
Marginal workers: Others	55	33	22
Non-workers	846	294	552
