= Sogwe =

Village in Maharashtra

- village
- Location in Maharashtra, India Sogwe (India)
- Coordinates: 20.004811°N 72.8101887°E
- Country: India
- State: Maharashtra
- District: Palghar
- Taluka: Dahanu
- Elevation: 58 m (190 ft)

Population (2011)
  - Total: 2,485
- Time zone: UTC+5:30 (IST)
- ISO 3166 code: IN-MH
- 2011 census code: 551595

Sogwe is a village in the Palghar district of Maharashtra, India. It is located in the Dahanu taluka.

== Demographics ==
According to the 2011 census of India, Sogwe has 471 households. The effective literacy rate (i.e. the literacy rate of population excluding children aged 6 and below) is 41.12%.

Demographics (2011 Census)
	Total	Male	Female
Population	2485	1205	1280
Children aged below 6 years	491	245	246
Scheduled caste	10	6	4
Scheduled tribe	2448	1187	1261
Literates	820	472	348
Workers (all)	965	608	357
Main workers (total)	222	172	50
Main workers: Cultivators	13	11	2
Main workers: Agricultural labourers	68	50	18
Main workers: Household industry workers	7	7	0
Main workers: Other	134	104	30
Marginal workers (total)	743	436	307
Marginal workers: Cultivators	83	46	37
Marginal workers: Agricultural labourers	471	268	203
Marginal workers: Household industry workers	2	1	1
Marginal workers: Others	187	121	66
Non-workers	1520	597	923
