= Jingaon =

Village in Maharashtra

- village
- Location in Maharashtra, India Jingaon (India)
- Coordinates: 20.0558164°N 72.8308692°E
- Country: India
- State: Maharashtra
- District: Palghar
- Taluka: Dahanu
- Elevation: 286 m (938 ft)

Population (2011)
  - Total: 1,493
- Time zone: UTC+5:30 (IST)
- 2011 census code: 551645

Jingaon is a village in the Palghar district of Maharashtra, India. It is located in the Dahanu taluka.

== Demographics ==
According to the 2011 census of India, Jingaon has 274 households. The effective literacy rate (i.e. the literacy rate of population excluding children aged 6 and below) is 44.65%.

Demographics (2011 Census)
	Total	Male	Female
Population	1493	720	773
Children aged below 6 years	241	108	133
Scheduled caste	10	5	5
Scheduled tribe	1457	703	754
Literates	559	331	228
Workers (all)	632	361	271
Main workers (total)	447	329	118
Main workers: Cultivators	273	208	65
Main workers: Agricultural labourers	106	70	36
Main workers: Household industry workers	9	6	3
Main workers: Other	59	45	14
Marginal workers (total)	185	32	153
Marginal workers: Cultivators	14	7	7
Marginal workers: Agricultural labourers	21	9	12
Marginal workers: Household industry workers	118	10	108
Marginal workers: Others	32	6	26
Non-workers	861	359	502
