= Ambistewadi =

Village in Maharashtra

- village
- Location in Maharashtra, India Ambistewadi (India)
- Coordinates: 19.9322936°N 72.6890255°E
- Country: India
- State: Maharashtra
- District: Palghar
- Taluka: Dahanu
- Elevation: 13 m (43 ft)

Population (2011)
  - Total: 1,310
- Time zone: UTC+5:30 (IST)
- 2011 census code: 551721

Ambistewadi is a village in the Palghar district of Maharashtra, India. It is located in the Dahanu taluka.

== Demographics ==
According to the 2011 census of India, Ambistewadi has 248 households. The effective literacy rate (i.e. the literacy rate of population excluding children aged 6 and below) is 86.27%.

Demographics (2011 Census)
	Total	Male	Female
Population	1310	633	677
Children aged below 6 years	130	59	71
Scheduled caste	0	0	0
Scheduled tribe	5	3	2
Literates	1018	537	481
Workers (all)	731	417	314
Main workers (total)	649	353	296
Main workers: Cultivators	205	186	19
Main workers: Agricultural labourers	23	13	10
Main workers: Household industry workers	45	39	6
Main workers: Other	376	115	261
Marginal workers (total)	82	64	18
Marginal workers: Cultivators	68	59	9
Marginal workers: Agricultural labourers	3	2	1
Marginal workers: Household industry workers	1	1	0
Marginal workers: Others	10	2	8
Non-workers	579	216	363
