= Bendgaon =

Village in Maharashtra

- village
- Location in Maharashtra, India Bendgaon (India)
- Coordinates: 20.0664348°N 72.9962491°E
- Country: India
- State: Maharashtra
- District: Palghar
- Taluka: Dahanu
- Elevation: 111 m (364 ft)

Population (2011)
  - Total: 828
- Time zone: UTC+5:30 (IST)
- ISO 3166 code: IN-MH
- 2011 census code: 551625

Bendgaon is a village in the Palghar district of Maharashtra, India. It is located in the Dahanu taluka.

== Demographics ==
According to the 2011 census of India, Bendgaon has 160 households. The effective literacy rate (i.e. the literacy rate of population excluding children aged 6 and below) is 40.38%.

Demographics (2011 Census)
	Total	Male	Female
Population	828	372	456
Children aged below 6 years	189	105	84
Scheduled caste	1	1	0
Scheduled tribe	824	368	456
Literates	258	148	110
Workers (all)	424	193	231
Main workers (total)	202	127	75
Main workers: Cultivators	135	97	38
Main workers: Agricultural labourers	50	20	30
Main workers: Household industry workers	4	0	4
Main workers: Other	13	10	3
Marginal workers (total)	222	66	156
Marginal workers: Cultivators	29	21	8
Marginal workers: Agricultural labourers	185	42	143
Marginal workers: Household industry workers	1	0	1
Marginal workers: Others	7	3	4
Non-workers	404	179	225
