= Thakurwadi =

Village in Maharashtra

- village
- Location in Maharashtra, India Thakurwadi (India)
- Coordinates: 20.0154188°N 72.7289272°E
- Country: India
- State: Maharashtra
- District: Palghar
- Taluka: Dahanu
- Elevation: 16 m (52 ft)

Population (2011)
  - Total: 935
- Time zone: UTC+5:30 (IST)
- 2011 census code: 551590

Thakurwadi, Raypur Tanda, is a village in the Nanded of Maharashtra, India. It is located in the kinwat taluka. 431805

== Demographics ==
According to the 2011 census of India, Thakurwadi has 203 households. The effective literacy rate (i.e. the literacy rate of population excluding children aged 6 and below) is 85.53%.

Demographics (2011 Census)
	Total	Male	Female
Population	935	464	471
Children aged below 6 years	78	37	41
Scheduled caste	12	6	6
Scheduled tribe	243	130	113
Literates	733	380	353
Workers (all)	316	254	62
Main workers (total)	309	250	59
Main workers: Cultivators	80	71	9
Main workers: Agricultural labourers	88	62	26
Main workers: Household industry workers	12	6	6
Main workers: Other	129	111	18
Marginal workers (total)	7	4	3
Marginal workers: Cultivators	2	1	1
Marginal workers: Agricultural labourers	2	0	2
Marginal workers: Household industry workers	0	0	0
Marginal workers: Others	3	3	0
Non-workers	619	210	409
