= Gowane =

Village in Palghar district, India

- village
- Location in Maharashtra, India Gowane (India)
- Coordinates: 19.8916621°N 72.8013252°E
- Country: India
- State: Maharashtra
- District: Palghar
- Taluka: Dahanu
- Elevation: 21 m (69 ft)

Population (2011)
  - Total: 2,051
- Time zone: UTC+5:30 (IST)
- 2011 census code: 551736

Gowane is a village in the Palghar district of Maharashtra, India. It is located in the Dahanu taluka.

== Demographics ==
According to the 2011 census of India, Gowane has 418 households. The effective literacy rate (i.e. the literacy rate of population excluding children aged 6 and below) is 52.22%.

Demographics (2011 Census)
	Total	Male	Female
Population	2051	1026	1025
Children aged below 6 years	358	193	165
Scheduled caste	9	5	4
Scheduled tribe	1888	940	948
Literates	884	529	355
Workers (all)	988	569	419
Main workers (total)	279	205	74
Main workers: Cultivators	18	16	2
Main workers: Agricultural labourers	106	72	34
Main workers: Household industry workers	7	6	1
Main workers: Other	148	111	37
Marginal workers (total)	709	364	345
Marginal workers: Cultivators	106	65	41
Marginal workers: Agricultural labourers	555	277	278
Marginal workers: Household industry workers	14	7	7
Marginal workers: Others	34	15	19
Non-workers	1063	457	606
