= Kapshi, Dahanu =

Village in Maharashtra

Kapshi
- village
- Location in Maharashtra, India Kapshi (India)
- Coordinates: 19.8944895°N 72.7717775°E
- Country: India
- State: Maharashtra
- District: Palghar
- Taluka: Dahanu
- Elevation: 11 m (36 ft)

Population (2011)
  - Total: 1,439
- Time zone: UTC+5:30 (IST)
- Postal code: 401103
- 2011 census code: 551733

Kapshi is a village in the Palghar district of Maharashtra, India. It is located in the Dahanu taluka Near Vangaon Railway Station.

== Demographics ==
According to the 2011 census of India, Kapshi has 324 households. The effective literacy rate (i.e. the literacy rate of population excluding children aged 6 and below) is 70.68%.

Demographics (2011 Census)
	Total	Male	Female
Population	1439	710	729
Children aged below 6 years	211	109	102
Scheduled caste	187	92	95
Scheduled tribe	1037	510	527
Literates	868	500	368
Workers (all)	630	356	274
Main workers (total)	384	231	153
Main workers: Cultivators	22	13	9
Main workers: Agricultural labourers	52	25	27
Main workers: Household industry workers	10	5	5
Main workers: Other	300	188	112
Marginal workers (total)	246	125	121
Marginal workers: Cultivators	64	37	27
Marginal workers: Agricultural labourers	57	23	34
Marginal workers: Household industry workers	10	6	4
Marginal workers: Others	115	59	56
Non-workers	809	354	455
