= Jalwai =

Village in Maharashtra

- village
- Location in Maharashtra, India Jalwai (India)
- Coordinates: 20.0892339°N 72.7762099°E
- Country: India
- State: Maharashtra
- District: Palghar
- Taluka: Dahanu
- Elevation: 34 m (112 ft)

Population (2011)
  - Total: 1,405
- Time zone: UTC+5:30 (IST)
- 2011 census code: 551578

Jalwai is a village in the Palghar district of Maharashtra, India. It is located in the Dahanu taluka.

== Demographics ==
According to the 2011 census of India, Jalwai has 306 households. The effective literacy rate (i.e. the literacy rate of population excluding children aged 6 and below) is 40.73%.

Demographics (2011 Census)
	Total	Male	Female
Population	1405	632	773
Children aged below 6 years	310	159	151
Scheduled caste	0	0	0
Scheduled tribe	1382	619	763
Literates	446	273	173
Workers (all)	484	282	202
Main workers (total)	467	276	191
Main workers: Cultivators	18	14	4
Main workers: Agricultural labourers	427	243	184
Main workers: Household industry workers	2	1	1
Main workers: Other	20	18	2
Marginal workers (total)	17	6	11
Marginal workers: Cultivators	5	2	3
Marginal workers: Agricultural labourers	1	0	1
Marginal workers: Household industry workers	0	0	0
Marginal workers: Others	11	4	7
Non-workers	921	350	571
