= Vadhane =

Village in Maharashtra

- village
- Location in Maharashtra, India Vadhane (India)
- Coordinates: 19.928628°N 72.8840395°E
- Country: India
- State: Maharashtra
- District: Palghar
- Taluka: Dahanu
- Elevation: 51 m (167 ft)

Population (2011)
  - Total: 1,357
- Time zone: UTC+5:30 (IST)
- 2011 census code: 551690

Vadhane is a village in the Palghar district of Maharashtra, India. It is located in the Dahanu taluka.

== Demographics ==
According to the 2011 census of India, Vadhane has 255 households. The effective literacy rate (i.e. the literacy rate of population excluding children aged 6 and below) is 44.06%.

Demographics (2011 Census)
| | Total | Male | Female |
|---|---|---|---|
| Population | 1357 | 672 | 685 |
| Children aged below 6 years | 229 | 124 | 105 |
| Scheduled caste | 0 | 0 | 0 |
| Scheduled tribe | 1251 | 620 | 631 |
| Literates | 497 | 315 | 182 |
| Workers (all) | 740 | 366 | 374 |
| Main workers (total) | 708 | 351 | 357 |
| Main workers: Cultivators | 353 | 199 | 154 |
| Main workers: Agricultural labourers | 217 | 121 | 96 |
| Main workers: Household industry workers | 0 | 0 | 0 |
| Main workers: Other | 138 | 31 | 107 |
| Marginal workers (total) | 32 | 15 | 17 |
| Marginal workers: Cultivators | 25 | 12 | 13 |
| Marginal workers: Agricultural labourers | 5 | 1 | 4 |
| Marginal workers: Household industry workers | 1 | 1 | 0 |
| Marginal workers: Others | 1 | 1 | 0 |
| Non-workers | 617 | 306 | 311 |
