= Dhundalwadi =

Village in Maharashtra

- village
- Location in Maharashtra, India Dhundalwadi (India)
- Coordinates: 20.0461606°N 72.9076669°E
- Country: India
- State: Maharashtra
- District: Palghar
- Taluka: Dahanu
- Elevation: 68 m (223 ft)

Population (2011)
  - Total: 2,059
- Time zone: UTC+5:30 (IST)
- 2011 census code: 551640

Dhundalwadi is a village in the Palghar district of Maharashtra, India. It is located in the Dahanu taluka.

== Demographics ==
According to the 2011 census of India, Dhundalwadi has 365 households. The effective literacy rate (i.e. the literacy rate of population excluding children aged 6 and below) is 66.76%.

Demographics (2011 Census)
	Total	Male	Female
Population	2059	1025	1034
Children aged below 6 years	236	114	122
Scheduled caste	27	14	13
Scheduled tribe	1750	875	875
Literates	1217	718	499
Workers (all)	838	441	397
Main workers (total)	370	217	153
Main workers: Cultivators	121	58	63
Main workers: Agricultural labourers	102	42	60
Main workers: Household industry workers	34	23	11
Main workers: Other	113	94	19
Marginal workers (total)	468	224	244
Marginal workers: Cultivators	217	103	114
Marginal workers: Agricultural labourers	144	67	77
Marginal workers: Household industry workers	44	20	24
Marginal workers: Others	63	34	29
Non-workers	1221	584	637
