= Jamshet =

Village in Maharashtra

- village
- Location in Maharashtra, India Jamshet (India)
- Coordinates: 19.9716746°N 72.7954159°E
- Country: India
- State: Maharashtra
- District: Palghar
- Taluka: Dahanu
- Elevation: 21 m (69 ft)

Population (2011)
  - Total: 1,775
- Time zone: UTC+5:30 (IST)
- 2011 census code: 551609

Jamshet is a village in the Palghar district of Maharashtra, India. It is located in the Dahanu taluka.

== Demographics ==
According to the 2011 census of India, Jamshet has 294 households. The effective literacy rate (i.e. the literacy rate of population excluding children aged 6 and below) is 54.58%.

Demographics (2011 Census)
| | Total | Male | Female |
|---|---|---|---|
| Population | 1775 | 893 | 882 |
| Children aged below 6 years | 245 | 141 | 104 |
| Scheduled caste | 0 | 0 | 0 |
| Scheduled tribe | 1743 | 886 | 857 |
| Literates | 835 | 472 | 363 |
| Workers (all) | 658 | 387 | 271 |
| Main workers (total) | 608 | 366 | 242 |
| Main workers: Cultivators | 69 | 53 | 16 |
| Main workers: Agricultural labourers | 301 | 148 | 153 |
| Main workers: Household industry workers | 8 | 7 | 1 |
| Main workers: Other | 230 | 158 | 72 |
| Marginal workers (total) | 50 | 21 | 29 |
| Marginal workers: Cultivators | 3 | 1 | 2 |
| Marginal workers: Agricultural labourers | 31 | 12 | 19 |
| Marginal workers: Household industry workers | 3 | 2 | 1 |
| Marginal workers: Others | 13 | 6 | 7 |
| Non-workers | 1117 | 506 | 611 |
