= Dahanu =

- Town
- Location in Maharashtra, India Dahanu (India)
- Coordinates: 19.97°N 72.73°E
- Country: India
- State: Maharashtra
- District: Palghar

Government
  - Body: 1) Assistant Collector Sub Division Dahanu 2) Tahsildar & Executive Magistrate Dahanu 3) Dahanu municipal

Area
  - Total: 18.20 km^{2} (7.03 sq mi)
- Elevation: 9.88 m (32.4 ft)

Population (2011)
  - Total: Around 80,000 (DMC limits)
  - Density: 305/km^{2} (790/sq mi)

Languages
  - Official: Marathi
- Time zone: UTC+5:30 (IST)
- PIN: 401601, 401602,401603,401607,401608
- Telephone code: 02528
- Vehicle registration: MH 04, MH 48
- Website: www.dahanu.com

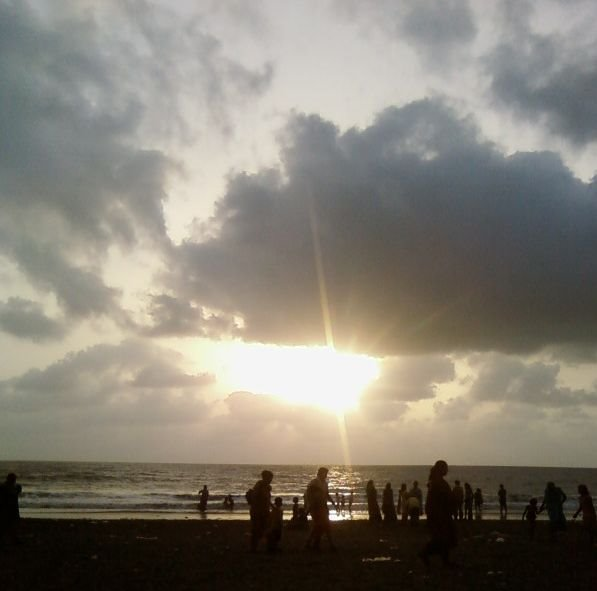
Sunset at Parnaka Beach

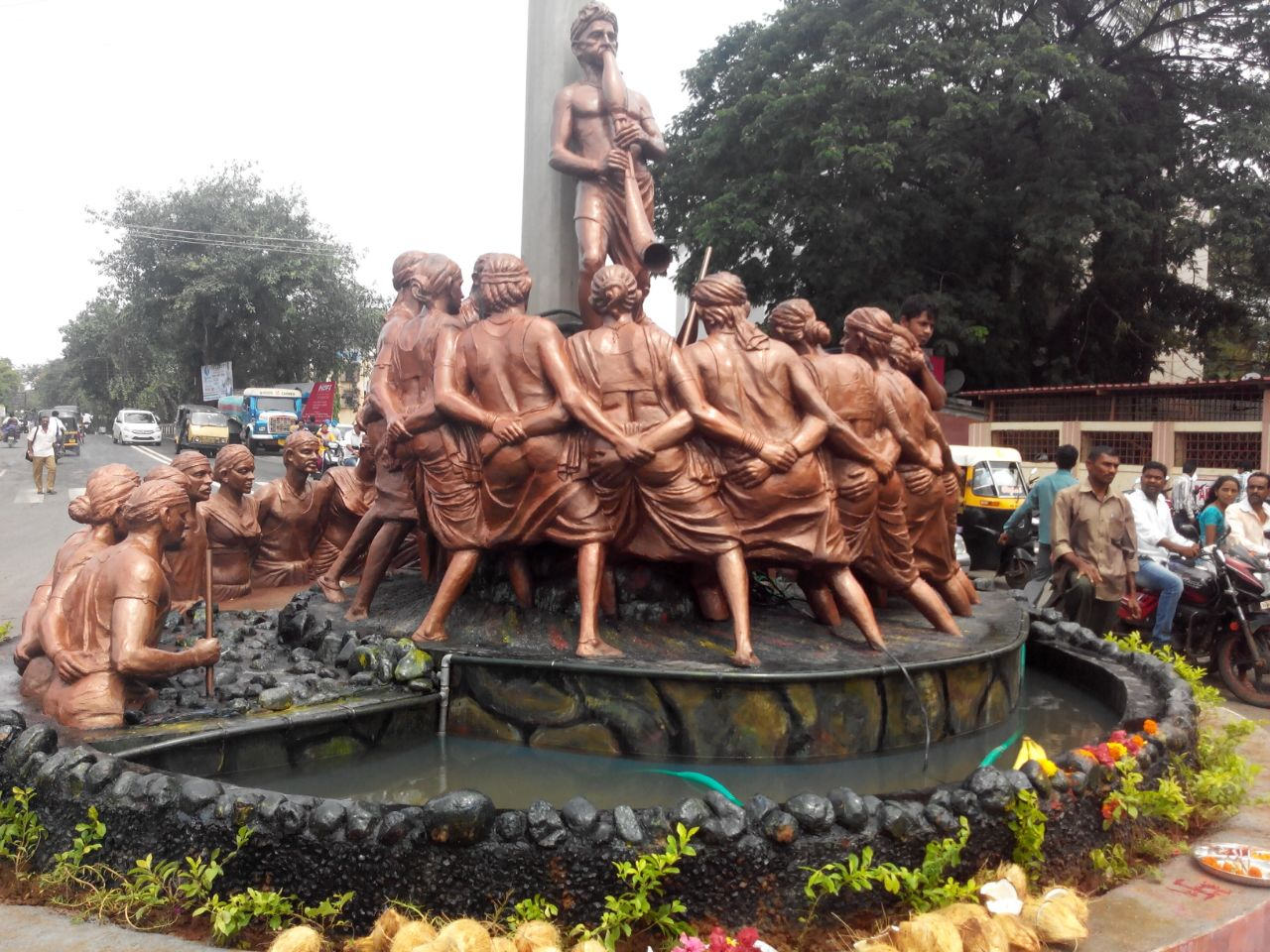
Traditional Dance Tarpa Statue, Sagar Naka, Dahanu

Dahanu (Pronunciation: [ɖəɦaːɳuː]) is a coastal town and a municipal council in Palghar district of Maharashtra state in Konkan division. It is located 110 km from Mumbai city and hosts Adani Power’s thermal power station. It is the site of the approved Vadhavan Port.

== Dahanu Thermal Power Station ==
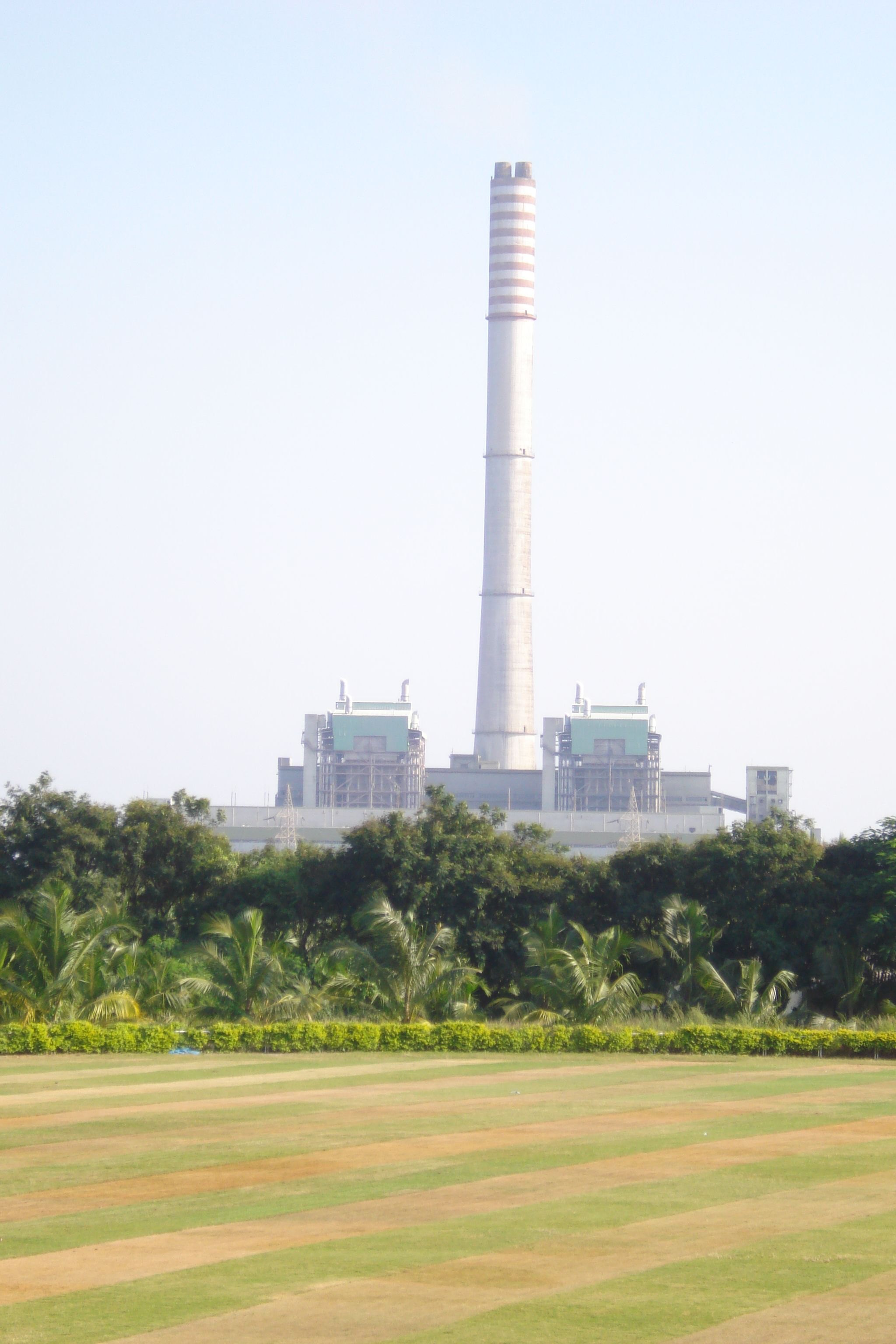
A view of Dahanu Thermal Power Station, Adani electricity

Adani Dahanu Thermal Power Station (ADTPS) is a 500 MW (2 X 250 MW) coal-based thermal power station.

The power plant was commissioned in 1995. DTPS is the first power utility to get both ISO 9000 and ISO 14001 certificates in India.

Electrostatic precipitators (ESP) are installed to collect fly ash and minimize emissions to the atmosphere.

ADTPS has installed a 275.34 m stack to ensure better dispersion of particulate matter. The stack has a diameter of 31.5 m at the bottom and a diameter of 16 m at the top, with two separate flues of 5.25 m diameter at the bottom and 4.75 m diameter at the top for each unit. This is the highest stack in Asia

== Geography ==
Dahanu is located at 19.97°N 72.73°E. It has an average elevation of 9.89 metres.

=== Climate ===
Climate data for Dahanu (1991–2020, extremes 1943–present)
Month	Jan	Feb	Mar	Apr	May	Jun	Jul	Aug	Sep	Oct	Nov	Dec	Year
Record high °C (°F)	35.6 (96.1)	38.6 (101.5)	40.9 (105.6)	40.6 (105.1)	40.4 (104.7)	39.2 (102.6)	36.9 (98.4)	33.6 (92.5)	36.7 (98.1)	38.9 (102.0)	37.8 (100.0)	36.9 (98.4)	40.9 (105.6)
Mean daily maximum °C (°F)	27.8 (82.0)	28.9 (84.0)	31.3 (88.3)	33.1 (91.6)	34.4 (93.9)	33.1 (91.6)	30.8 (87.4)	30.3 (86.5)	31.1 (88.0)	33.3 (91.9)	32.7 (90.9)	30.0 (86.0)	31.4 (88.5)
Mean daily minimum °C (°F)	17.1 (62.8)	18.4 (65.1)	21.3 (70.3)	24.4 (75.9)	27.4 (81.3)	27.1 (80.8)	26.1 (79.0)	25.7 (78.3)	25.1 (77.2)	24.1 (75.4)	21.7 (71.1)	18.7 (65.7)	23.0 (73.4)
Record low °C (°F)	8.3 (46.9)	8.8 (47.8)	12.8 (55.0)	17.8 (64.0)	19.9 (67.8)	15.0 (59.0)	18.4 (65.1)	20.6 (69.1)	20.8 (69.4)	17.2 (63.0)	12.8 (55.0)	10.0 (50.0)	8.3 (46.9)
Average rainfall mm (inches)	0.2 (0.01)	0.1 (0.00)	0.3 (0.01)	0.0 (0.0)	3.5 (0.14)	456.3 (17.96)	787.5 (31.00)	484.8 (19.09)	349.2 (13.75)	43.0 (1.69)	8.4 (0.33)	1.3 (0.05)	2,134.6 (84.04)
Average rainy days	0.1	0.0	0.0	0.1	0.5	12.1	20.9	18.7	11.6	2.6	0.4	0.2	67.3
Average relative humidity (%) (at 17:30 IST)	67	64	62	64	67	76	84	83	78	70	67	66	71
Source: India Meteorological Department

== Demographics ==
As of 2011 India census, Dahanu has a population of 50,287. Males constitute 52% of the population and females 48%. Dahanu has an average literacy rate of 71%: male literacy is 77% and, female literacy is 64%. In Dahanu, 13% of the population is under 6 years of age.

Among minority languages, Gujarati is spoken by 34.43% of the population and Hindi by 19.80%.

== See also ==
- 2020 Palghar mob lynching
