= Ashagad =

Village in Maharashtra

- village
- Location in Maharashtra, India Ashagad (India)
- Coordinates: 19.9691925°N 72.7957852°E
- Country: India
- State: Maharashtra
- District: Palghar
- Taluka: Dahanu
- Elevation: 16 m (52 ft)

Population (2011)
  - Total: 4,160
- Time zone: UTC+5:30 (IST)
- 2011 census code: 551608

Ashagad is a village in the Palghar district of Maharashtra, India. It is located in the Dahanu taluka.

== Demographics ==
According to the 2011 census of India, Ashagad has 824 households. The effective literacy rate (i.e. the literacy rate of population excluding children aged 6 and below) is 76.05%.

Demographics (2011 Census)
| | Total | Male | Female |
|---|---|---|---|
| Population | 4160 | 1963 | 2197 |
| Children aged below 6 years | 519 | 246 | 273 |
| Scheduled caste | 40 | 23 | 17 |
| Scheduled tribe | 2066 | 781 | 1285 |
| Literates | 2769 | 1388 | 1381 |
| Workers (all) | 1566 | 1132 | 434 |
| Main workers (total) | 1257 | 974 | 283 |
| Main workers: Cultivators | 90 | 57 | 33 |
| Main workers: Agricultural labourers | 190 | 99 | 91 |
| Main workers: Household industry workers | 56 | 42 | 14 |
| Main workers: Other | 921 | 776 | 145 |
| Marginal workers (total) | 309 | 158 | 151 |
| Marginal workers: Cultivators | 46 | 26 | 20 |
| Marginal workers: Agricultural labourers | 26 | 5 | 21 |
| Marginal workers: Household industry workers | 56 | 6 | 50 |
| Marginal workers: Others | 181 | 121 | 60 |
| Non-workers | 2594 | 831 | 1763 |
