= Kosesari =

Village in Maharashtra

- village
- Location in Maharashtra, India Kosesari (India)
- Coordinates: 19.9310316°N 73.0257691°E
- Country: India
- State: Maharashtra
- District: Palghar
- Taluka: Dahanu
- Elevation: 78 m (256 ft)

Population (2011)
  - Total: 1,092
- Time zone: UTC+5:30 (IST)
- 2011 census code: 551745

Kosesari is a village in the Palghar district of Maharashtra, India. It is located in the Dahanu taluka. It is in rural part of Palghar, and it is one of the 173 villages of Dahanu Block of Palghar district.

== Demographics ==
According to the 2011 census of India, Kosesari has 216 households. The effective literacy rate (i.e. the literacy rate of population excluding children aged 6 and below) is 32.9%.

Demographics (2011 Census)
	Total	Male	Female
Population	1092	539	553
Children aged below 6 years	238	123	115
Scheduled caste	0	0	0
Scheduled tribe	1091	539	552
Literates	281	190	91
Workers (all)	633	307	326
Main workers (total)	604	303	301
Main workers: Cultivators	147	74	73
Main workers: Agricultural labourers	453	225	228
Main workers: Household industry workers	0	0	0
Main workers: Other	4	4	0
Marginal workers (total)	29	4	25
Marginal workers: Cultivators	3	1	2
Marginal workers: Agricultural labourers	25	3	22
Marginal workers: Household industry workers	0	0	0
Marginal workers: Others	1	0	1
Non-workers	459	232	227
