= Kinhawali =

Village in Maharashtra

Kinhawali Kinhavali, Kinholi
- village
- Location in Maharashtra, India Kinhawali (India)
- Coordinates: 20.0569844°N 73.1054544°E
- Country: India
- State: Maharashtra
- District: Palghar
- Taluka: Dahanu
- Elevation: 177 m (581 ft)

Population (2011)
  - Total: 2,163
- Time zone: UTC+5:30 (IST)
- 2011 census code: 551632

Kinhawali is a village in the Palghar district of Maharashtra, India. It is located in the Dahanu taluka.

== Demographics ==
According to the 2011 census of India, Kinhawali has 331 households. The effective literacy rate (i.e. the literacy rate of population excluding children aged 6 and below) is 43.55%.

Demographics (2011 Census)
	Total	Male	Female
Population	2163	1119	1044
Children aged below 6 years	402	203	199
Scheduled caste	3	2	1
Scheduled tribe	2157	1114	1043
Literates	767	503	264
Workers (all)	938	490	448
Main workers (total)	613	351	262
Main workers: Cultivators	340	234	106
Main workers: Agricultural labourers	258	103	155
Main workers: Household industry workers	2	2	0
Main workers: Other	13	12	1
Marginal workers (total)	325	139	186
Marginal workers: Cultivators	236	112	124
Marginal workers: Agricultural labourers	86	26	60
Marginal workers: Household industry workers	1	0	1
Marginal workers: Others	2	1	1
Non-workers	1225	629	596
