= Chari Tarf Jamshet =

Village in Maharashtra

- village
- Location in Maharashtra, India Chari Tarf Jamshet (India)
- Coordinates: 19.9379271°N 72.9785353°E
- Country: India
- State: Maharashtra
- District: Palghar
- Taluka: Dahanu
- Elevation: 86 m (282 ft)

Population (2011)
  - Total: 464
- Time zone: UTC+5:30 (IST)
- 2011 census code: 551668

Chari Tarf Jamshet is a village in the Palghar district of Maharashtra, India. It is located in the Dahanu taluka.

== Demographics ==
According to the 2011 census of India, Chari Tarf Jamshet has 125 households. The effective literacy rate (i.e. the literacy rate of population excluding children aged 6 and below) is 38.24%.

Demographics (2011 Census)
	Total	Male	Female
Population	464	230	234
Children aged below 6 years	77	45	32
Scheduled caste	0	0	0
Scheduled tribe	462	229	233
Literates	148	86	62
Workers (all)	229	103	126
Main workers (total)	227	102	125
Main workers: Cultivators	135	96	39
Main workers: Agricultural labourers	80	5	75
Main workers: Household industry workers	11	0	11
Main workers: Other	1	1	0
Marginal workers (total)	2	1	1
Marginal workers: Cultivators	1	0	1
Marginal workers: Agricultural labourers	1	1	0
Marginal workers: Household industry workers	0	0	0
Marginal workers: Others	0	0	0
Non-workers	235	127	108
