= Ghadane =

Village in Maharashtra

- village
- Location in Maharashtra, India Ghadane (India)
- Coordinates: 20.0529942°N 72.8604097°E
- Country: India
- State: Maharashtra
- District: Palghar
- Taluka: Dahanu
- Elevation: 53 m (174 ft)

Population (2011)
  - Total: 1,202
- Time zone: UTC+5:30 (IST)
- ISO 3166 code: IN-MH
- 2011 census code: 551644

Ghadane is a village in the Palghar district of Maharashtra, India. It is located in the Dahanu taluka.

== Demographics ==
According to the 2011 census of India, Ghadane has 234 households. The effective literacy rate (i.e. the literacy rate of population excluding children aged 6 and below) is 41.62%.

Demographics (2011 Census)
	Total	Male	Female
Population	1202	580	622
Children aged below 6 years	253	134	119
Scheduled caste	0	0	0
Scheduled tribe	1196	578	618
Literates	395	241	154
Workers (all)	497	273	224
Main workers (total)	397	227	170
Main workers: Cultivators	286	153	133
Main workers: Agricultural labourers	91	58	33
Main workers: Household industry workers	1	1	0
Main workers: Other	19	15	4
Marginal workers (total)	100	46	54
Marginal workers: Cultivators	19	7	12
Marginal workers: Agricultural labourers	46	17	29
Marginal workers: Household industry workers	7	4	3
Marginal workers: Others	28	18	10
Non-workers	705	307	398
