= Murbad, Dahanu =

Village in Maharashtra

Murbad
- village
- Location in Maharashtra, India Location in India
- Coordinates: 19.8840653°N 72.9873924°E
- Country: India
- State: Maharashtra
- District: Palghar
- Taluka: Dahanu
- Elevation: 64 m (210 ft)

Population (2011)
  - Total: 3,004
- Time zone: UTC+5:30 (IST)
- 2011 census code: 551747

Murbad is a village in the Palghar district of Maharashtra, India. It is located in the Dahanu taluka.

== Demographics ==
According to the 2011 census of India, Murbad has 532 households. The effective literacy rate (i.e. the literacy rate of population excluding children aged 6 and below) is 34.42%.

Demographics (2011 Census)
	Total	Male	Female
Population	3004	1480	1524
Children aged below 6 years	642	330	312
Scheduled caste	0	0	0
Scheduled tribe	2975	1464	1511
Literates	813	490	323
Workers (all)	1501	738	763
Main workers (total)	911	574	337
Main workers: Cultivators	405	291	114
Main workers: Agricultural labourers	451	251	200
Main workers: Household industry workers	13	9	4
Main workers: Other	42	23	19
Marginal workers (total)	590	164	426
Marginal workers: Cultivators	148	39	109
Marginal workers: Agricultural labourers	381	104	277
Marginal workers: Household industry workers	33	6	27
Marginal workers: Others	28	15	13
Non-workers	1503	742	761
