= Nimbapur =

Village in Maharashtra

- village
- Location in Maharashtra, India Nimbapur (India)
- Coordinates: 19.9889306°N 72.9992013°E
- Country: India
- State: Maharashtra
- District: Palghar
- Taluka: Dahanu
- Elevation: 139 m (456 ft)

Population (2011)
  - Total: 1,903
- Time zone: UTC+5:30 (IST)
- 2011 census code: 551663

Nimbapur is a village in the Palghar district of Maharashtra, India. It is located in the Dahanu taluka.

== Demographics ==
According to the 2011 census of India, Nimbapur has 370 households. The effective literacy rate (i.e. the literacy rate of population excluding children aged 6 and below) is 35.16%.

Demographics (2011 Census)
	Total	Male	Female
Population	1903	887	1016
Children aged below 6 years	367	162	205
Scheduled caste	2	0	2
Scheduled tribe	1886	881	1005
Literates	540	326	214
Workers (all)	798	433	365
Main workers (total)	587	370	217
Main workers: Cultivators	370	245	125
Main workers: Agricultural labourers	169	88	81
Main workers: Household industry workers	6	6	0
Main workers: Other	42	31	11
Marginal workers (total)	211	63	148
Marginal workers: Cultivators	40	30	10
Marginal workers: Agricultural labourers	145	22	123
Marginal workers: Household industry workers	2	0	2
Marginal workers: Others	24	11	13
Non-workers	1105	454	651
