= Ranshet =

Village in Maharashtra

- village
- Location in Maharashtra, India Ranshet (India)
- Coordinates: 19.9335466°N 72.9047136°E
- Country: India
- State: Maharashtra
- District: Palghar
- Taluka: Dahanu
- Elevation: 78 m (256 ft)

Population (2011)
  - Total: 2,173
- Time zone: UTC+5:30 (IST)
- 2011 census code: 551691

Ranshet is a village in the Palghar district of Maharashtra, India. It is located in the Dahanu taluka.

== Demographics ==
According to the 2011 census of India, Ranshet has 386 households. The effective literacy rate (i.e. the literacy rate of population excluding children aged 6 and below) is 60.95%.

Demographics (2011 Census)
	Total	Male	Female
Population	2173	1045	1128
Children aged below 6 years	296	153	143
Scheduled caste	0	0	0
Scheduled tribe	2161	1039	1122
Literates	1144	644	500
Workers (all)	908	407	501
Main workers (total)	692	341	351
Main workers: Cultivators	537	267	270
Main workers: Agricultural labourers	100	42	58
Main workers: Household industry workers	7	4	3
Main workers: Other	48	28	20
Marginal workers (total)	216	66	150
Marginal workers: Cultivators	63	31	32
Marginal workers: Agricultural labourers	129	23	106
Marginal workers: Household industry workers	2	1	1
Marginal workers: Others	22	11	11
Non-workers	1265	638	627
