= Motgaon =

Village in Maharashtra

Matgaon
- village
- Location in Maharashtra, India Matgaon (India)
- Coordinates: 19.9194983°N 72.7324059°E
- Country: India
- State: Maharashtra
- District: Palghar
- Taluka: Dahanu
- Elevation: 7 m (23 ft)

Population (2011)
  - Total: 1,199
- Time zone: UTC+5:30 (IST)
- 2011 census code: 551725

Matgaon is a village in the Palghar district of Maharashtra, India. It is located in the Dahanu taluka.

== Demographics ==
According to the 2011 census of India, Matgaon has 265 households. The effective literacy rate (i.e. the literacy rate of population excluding children aged 6 and below) is 71.71%.

Demographics (2011 Census)
	Total	Male	Female
Population	1199	591	608
Children aged below 6 years	114	51	63
Scheduled caste	0	0	0
Scheduled tribe	11	5	6
Literates	778	456	322
Workers (all)	638	359	279
Main workers (total)	259	162	97
Main workers: Cultivators	32	19	13
Main workers: Agricultural labourers	114	51	63
Main workers: Household industry workers	66	61	5
Main workers: Other	47	31	16
Marginal workers (total)	379	197	182
Marginal workers: Cultivators	145	67	78
Marginal workers: Agricultural labourers	122	51	71
Marginal workers: Household industry workers	78	64	14
Marginal workers: Others	34	15	19
Non-workers	561	232	329
