= Naraliwadi =

Village in Maharashtra

- village
- Location in Maharashtra, India Naraliwadi (India)
- Coordinates: 20.0594808°N 72.7377934°E
- Country: India
- State: Maharashtra
- District: Palghar
- Taluka: Dahanu
- Elevation: 17 m (56 ft)

Population (2011)
  - Total: 920
- Time zone: UTC+5:30 (IST)
- 2011 census code: 551586

Naraliwadi is a village in the Palghar district of Maharashtra, India. It is located in the Dahanu taluka.

== Demographics ==
According to the 2011 census of India, Naraliwadi has 207 households. The effective literacy rate (i.e. the literacy rate of population excluding children aged 6 and below) is 65.32%.

Demographics (2011 Census)
	Total	Male	Female
Population	920	440	480
Children aged below 6 years	104	47	57
Scheduled caste	3	2	1
Scheduled tribe	909	433	476
Literates	533	300	233
Workers (all)	415	267	148
Main workers (total)	374	239	135
Main workers: Cultivators	38	22	16
Main workers: Agricultural labourers	95	50	45
Main workers: Household industry workers	8	6	2
Main workers: Other	233	161	72
Marginal workers (total)	41	28	13
Marginal workers: Cultivators	8	2	6
Marginal workers: Agricultural labourers	17	12	5
Marginal workers: Household industry workers	2	2	0
Marginal workers: Others	14	12	2
Non-workers	505	173	332
