= Osarwadi =

Village in Maharashtra

- village
- Location in Maharashtra, India Osarwadi (India)
- Coordinates: 19.9058791°N 72.7126718°E
- Country: India
- State: Maharashtra
- District: Palghar
- Taluka: Dahanu
- Elevation: 14 m (46 ft)

Population (2011)
  - Total: 1,112
- Time zone: UTC+5:30 (IST)
- 2011 census code: 551727

Osarwadi is a village in the Palghar district of Maharashtra, India. It is located in the Dahanu taluka.

== Demographics ==
According to the 2011 census of India, Osarwadi has 267 households. The effective literacy rate (i.e. the literacy rate of population excluding children aged 6 and below) is 71.02%.

Demographics (2011 Census)
	Total	Male	Female
Population	1112	547	565
Children aged below 6 years	132	65	67
Scheduled caste	0	0	0
Scheduled tribe	391	187	204
Literates	696	387	309
Workers (all)	545	368	177
Main workers (total)	395	284	111
Main workers: Cultivators	51	46	5
Main workers: Agricultural labourers	127	75	52
Main workers: Household industry workers	120	118	2
Main workers: Other	97	45	52
Marginal workers (total)	150	84	66
Marginal workers: Cultivators	132	75	57
Marginal workers: Agricultural labourers	8	2	6
Marginal workers: Household industry workers	7	6	1
Marginal workers: Others	3	1	2
Non-workers	567	179	388
