= Kankradi =

Village in Maharashtra

- village
- Location in Maharashtra, India Kankradi (India)
- Coordinates: 20.0033891°N 72.7525697°E
- Country: India
- State: Maharashtra
- District: Palghar
- Taluka: Dahanu
- Elevation: 19 m (62 ft)

Population (2011)
  - Total: 1,769
- Time zone: UTC+5:30 (IST)
- 2011 census code: 551600

Kankradi is a village in the Palghar district of Maharashtra, India. It is located in the Dahanu taluka.

== Demographics ==
According to the 2011 census of India, Kankradi has 369 households. The effective literacy rate (i.e. the literacy rate of population excluding children aged 6 and below) is 62.75%.

Demographics (2011 Census)
	Total	Male	Female
Population	1769	883	886
Children aged below 6 years	236	114	122
Scheduled caste	74	39	35
Scheduled tribe	1145	561	584
Literates	962	552	410
Workers (all)	815	510	305
Main workers (total)	693	442	251
Main workers: Cultivators	49	40	9
Main workers: Agricultural labourers	81	52	29
Main workers: Household industry workers	14	6	8
Main workers: Other	549	344	205
Marginal workers (total)	122	68	54
Marginal workers: Cultivators	3	0	3
Marginal workers: Agricultural labourers	44	32	12
Marginal workers: Household industry workers	7	2	5
Marginal workers: Others	68	34	34
Non-workers	954	373	581
