= Dedale =

Village in Maharashtra, India

- village
- Location in Maharashtra, India Dedale (India)
- Coordinates: 19.8726428°N 72.7111939°E
- Country: India
- State: Maharashtra
- District: Palghar
- Taluka: Dahanu
- Elevation: 10 m (33 ft)

Population (2011)
  - Total: 1,109
- Time zone: UTC+5:30 (IST)
- 2011 census code: 551729

Dedale is a village in the Palghar district of Maharashtra, India. It is located in the Dahanu taluka.

== Demographics ==
According to the 2011 census of India, Dedale has 278 households. The effective literacy rate (i.e. the literacy rate of population excluding children aged 6 and below) is 79.39%.

Demographics (2011 Census)
	Total	Male	Female
Population	1109	524	585
Children aged below 6 years	124	60	64
Scheduled caste	3	2	1
Scheduled tribe	799	380	419
Literates	782	405	377
Workers (all)	526	312	214
Main workers (total)	497	301	196
Main workers: Cultivators	30	25	5
Main workers: Agricultural labourers	266	134	132
Main workers: Household industry workers	15	14	1
Main workers: Other	186	128	58
Marginal workers (total)	29	11	18
Marginal workers: Cultivators	1	0	1
Marginal workers: Agricultural labourers	17	7	10
Marginal workers: Household industry workers	1	1	0
Marginal workers: Others	10	3	7
Non-workers	583	212	371
