= Mhasad =

Village in Maharashtra

- village
- Location in Maharashtra, India Mhasad (India)
- Coordinates: 19.8760869°N 72.8914233°E
- Country: India
- State: Maharashtra
- District: Palghar
- Taluka: Dahanu
- Elevation: 78 m (256 ft)

Population (2011)
  - Total: 422
- Time zone: UTC+5:30 (IST)
- 2011 census code: 551705

Mhasad is a village in the Palghar district of Maharashtra, India. It is located in the Dahanu taluka.

== Demographics ==
According to the 2011 census of India, Mhasad has 74 households. The effective literacy rate (i.e. the literacy rate of population excluding children aged 6 and below) is 50.85%.

Demographics (2011 Census)
	Total	Male	Female
Population	422	202	220
Children aged below 6 years	68	33	35
Scheduled caste	0	0	0
Scheduled tribe	415	197	218
Literates	180	106	74
Workers (all)	193	100	93
Main workers (total)	187	95	92
Main workers: Cultivators	160	79	81
Main workers: Agricultural labourers	6	3	3
Main workers: Household industry workers	0	0	0
Main workers: Other	21	13	8
Marginal workers (total)	6	5	1
Marginal workers: Cultivators	1	0	1
Marginal workers: Agricultural labourers	0	0	0
Marginal workers: Household industry workers	0	0	0
Marginal workers: Others	5	5	0
Non-workers	229	102	127
