= Motapada =

Village in Maharashtra

- village
- Location in Maharashtra, India Motapada (India)
- Coordinates: 19.9520531°N 72.7717775°E
- Country: India
- State: Maharashtra
- District: Palghar
- Taluka: Dahanu
- Elevation: 6 m (20 ft)

Population (2011)
  - Total: 1,149
- Time zone: UTC+5:30 (IST)
- 2011 census code: 551614

Motapada is a village in the Palghar district of Maharashtra, India. It is located in the Dahanu taluka.

== Demographics ==
According to the 2011 census of India, Motapada has 250 households. The effective literacy rate (i.e. the literacy rate of population excluding children aged 6 and below) is 53.33%.

Demographics (2011 Census)
	Total	Male	Female
Population	1149	572	577
Children aged below 6 years	157	94	63
Scheduled caste	0	0	0
Scheduled tribe	666	324	342
Literates	529	321	208
Workers (all)	496	302	194
Main workers (total)	480	296	184
Main workers: Cultivators	48	27	21
Main workers: Agricultural labourers	124	63	61
Main workers: Household industry workers	3	2	1
Main workers: Other	305	204	101
Marginal workers (total)	16	6	10
Marginal workers: Cultivators	1	0	1
Marginal workers: Agricultural labourers	7	0	7
Marginal workers: Household industry workers	1	0	1
Marginal workers: Others	7	6	1
Non-workers	653	270	383
