= Sasvand =

Village in Maharashtra

- village
- Location in Maharashtra, India Sasvand (India)
- Coordinates: 20.033053°N 72.9061903°E
- Country: India
- State: Maharashtra
- District: Palghar
- Taluka: Dahanu
- Elevation: 73 m (240 ft)

Population (2011)
  - Total: 266
- Time zone: UTC+5:30 (IST)
- 2011 census code: 551651

Sasvand is a village in the Palghar district of Maharashtra, India. It is located in the Dahanu taluka.

== Demographics ==
According to the 2011 census of India, Sasvand has 52 households. The effective literacy rate (i.e. the literacy rate of population excluding children aged 6 and below) is 42.99%.

Demographics (2011 Census)
	Total	Male	Female
Population	266	124	142
Children aged below 6 years	45	26	19
Scheduled caste	0	0	0
Scheduled tribe	261	121	140
Literates	95	54	41
Workers (all)	101	56	45
Main workers (total)	91	50	41
Main workers: Cultivators	53	30	23
Main workers: Agricultural labourers	0	0	0
Main workers: Household industry workers	0	0	0
Main workers: Other	38	20	18
Marginal workers (total)	10	6	4
Marginal workers: Cultivators	6	4	2
Marginal workers: Agricultural labourers	0	0	0
Marginal workers: Household industry workers	0	0	0
Marginal workers: Others	4	2	2
Non-workers	165	68	97
