= Ambivali =

Village in Maharashtra

- village
- Location in Maharashtra, India Ambivali (India)
- Coordinates: 19.722336°N 73.027245°E
- Country: India
- State: Maharashtra
- District: Palghar
- Taluka: Dahanu
- Elevation: 34 m (112 ft)

Population (2011)
  - Total: 798
- Time zone: UTC+5:30 (IST)
- 2011 census code: 551706

Ambivali is a village in the Palghar district of Maharashtra, India. It is located in the Dahanu taluka.

== Demographics ==
According to the 2011 census of India, Ambivali has 159 households. The effective literacy rate (i.e. the literacy rate of population excluding children aged 6 and below) is 42.2%.

Demographics (2011 Census)
	Total	Male	Female
Population	798	395	403
Children aged below 6 years	144	75	69
Scheduled caste	0	0	0
Scheduled tribe	794	393	401
Literates	276	182	94
Workers (all)	393	176	217
Main workers (total)	258	127	131
Main workers: Cultivators	118	63	55
Main workers: Agricultural labourers	109	43	66
Main workers: Household industry workers	0	0	0
Main workers: Other	31	21	10
Marginal workers (total)	135	49	86
Marginal workers: Cultivators	78	29	49
Marginal workers: Agricultural labourers	51	17	34
Marginal workers: Household industry workers	1	1	0
Marginal workers: Others	5	2	3
Non-workers	405	219	186
