= Vadade =

Village in Maharashtra

- village
- Location in Maharashtra, India Vadade (India)
- Coordinates: 19.9070566°N 72.724494°E
- Country: India
- State: Maharashtra
- District: Palghar
- Taluka: Dahanu
- Elevation: 12 m (39 ft)

Population (2011)
  - Total: 458
- Time zone: UTC+5:30 (IST)
- 2011 census code: 551726

Vadade is a village in the Palghar district of Maharashtra, India. It is located in the Dahanu taluka.

== Demographics ==
According to the 2011 census of India, Vadade has 103 households. The effective literacy rate (i.e. the literacy rate of population excluding children aged 6 and below) is 71.5%.

Demographics (2011 Census)
	Total	Male	Female
Population	458	209	249
Children aged below 6 years	44	18	26
Scheduled caste	0	0	0
Scheduled tribe	419	191	228
Literates	296	155	141
Workers (all)	258	132	126
Main workers (total)	142	74	68
Main workers: Cultivators	6	5	1
Main workers: Agricultural labourers	107	42	65
Main workers: Household industry workers	8	8	0
Main workers: Other	21	19	2
Marginal workers (total)	116	58	58
Marginal workers: Cultivators	22	9	13
Marginal workers: Agricultural labourers	37	20	17
Marginal workers: Household industry workers	18	10	8
Marginal workers: Others	39	19	20
Non-workers	200	77	123
