= Kunbi Jakki Part II =

1946 Konkani play by Pai Tiatrist

Kunbi Jakki
- Written by: João Agostinho Fernandes
- Characters: Jakki; Arius; Costaum; Caetano; Roque
- Original language: Konkani
- Subject: Landlords exploiting the Kunbis through their overseers
- Genre: Tiatr, comedy drama
- Setting: Rice field and courtroom in Portuguese Goa, 1961

Premiere
- Date premiered: 14 May 1946
- Place premiered: Shri Chitra Mandir, Comba, Margão

Kunbi Jakki and his Celebrated Cause, also known simply as Kunbi Jakki Part II, is a three-act Konkani play written by João Agostinho Fernandes. It is a sequel to the 1941 play of the same title. The play was first composed in Bombay on 3 September 1941, and later revised in Margão on 27 March 1945, with the final three scenes translated into Portuguese. The only documented performance of the work was staged at Shri Chitra Mandir in Comba, Margão on 14 May 1946. Critical reception of the sequel was less enthusiastic compared to its predecessor.

== Composition ==
The composition and staging of the play in spanned several years. The main body of the work was written in September 1941, seven years after the completion of its initial part, which had been composed in August 1934. This stands in contrast to Fernandes's earlier work, Batcara II, which was produced within a year of the original Batcara. Batcara II encountered a six-year delay before its staging, mirroring the situation with Kunbi Jakki Part II, which underwent revisions before being revised in Margão in March 1945 The translation of the final three scenes into Portuguese, including the incorporation of Konkani terms, was overseen by Professor D. D'Silva, who undertook the task of translating the dialogues from Konkani to Portuguese.

Fernandes dedicated his play to Dr. Joseph Alban D'Souza, who served as the Mayor of Bombay in 1945. In an additional note attached to the play, Fernandes specified that the final three scenes, initially composed in Portuguese, were sanctioned for public performance in diverse Portuguese colonies with Goan residents, without the need for special authorization. These locations included parts of Africa, such as Portuguese Angola, Portuguese Mozambique, and coastal cities like Lourenço Marques and Beira. The permission-free performance allowance also extended to Mombasa, and Nairobi in Kenya Colony, Dar es Salaam in Tanganyika Territory, and Portuguese Goa.

== Characters ==
Jakki is an elder Kunbi man who has leased a plot of rice field from Roque for harvesting purposes. He is the father of Caetano.

Arius is portrayed as the devil in human form. He takes on different identities, such as Iris Brandaum and later Sirvodkar, an advocate, while also employing Roque as his vassal and agent.

Costaum is a senior citizen Kunbi and Jakki's father-in-law. He is a humorous and sarcastic drunkard who, when under the influence of alcohol, engages in arguments with his wife using spoken words.

Caetano, Jakki's son, is an educated young advocate who represents his father in a court case. He is proficient in Portuguese and uses his credibility to assist various individuals in legal matters.

Roque is the proprietor of the rice field plot that he leases to Jakki. He acts as the vassal and representative of Arius.

== Plot summary ==
The plot continues from the first part and is set in 1961 in Goa. Over a span of 27 years, Arius has retained Roque as his subordinate and agent. Despite assuming different identities such as Iris Brandaum and later as a lawyer named Sirvodkar, Arius continues to engage in malevolent actions. Jakki's son, Caetano is a well-educated young man, and has become a lawyer. Fluent in Portuguese, he is recognized for his legal acumen and frequently engages with his family in the language. Caetano's standing in the legal field has led to a diverse range of individuals approaching him for legal advice and representation in their respective cases.

The elder members of the Kunbi community have a propensity for alcohol consumption. Costaum, Jakki's father-in-law, exhibits heightened vivacity and animation after partaking in a few measures of traditional country liquor. Costaum's sense of humor and biting sarcasm persist, even leading to verbal disputes with his wife Bostean, due to his drunkenness. A significant confrontation ensues as a result of a disagreement between Jakki and Arius. Recognizing Jakki's interest in a particular rice field parcel, Arius endeavors to secure a lease for it by employing his representative, Roque, to act as a proxy.

Through a formal agreement, the rice field plot is subsequently subleased by Roque to Jakki at an elevated price, stipulating that Jakki must settle the payment seven days prior to the anticipated crop harvest. However, the crop is ultimately decimated by pests. Following the incident, Roque's request for payment from Jakki, Jakki declines and receives a legal summons in return. This sets the stage for a reversal of fortunes, with Jakki's son Caetano displaying his astuteness in handling the unfolding events.

Before the court hearing, Roque passes away, casting doubt on Arius's claim as his name is not listed in the sublease agreement. Caetano successfully argues in defense of Jakki by pointing out that since the conditions of the agreement were not met due to the lack of a harvest, Jakki was relieved of the obligation to make any payment. In a dramatic turn of events, Arius vanishes quietly through a trapdoor amid fireworks, prompting speculation among the court and spectators about his enigmatic character, hinting at possible demonic attributes.

== Analysis ==
According to literary scholar André Rafael Fernandes, a professor at Goa University, Kunbi Jakki Part II fails to capture the same level of significance and influence as its predecessor. In his critique, Fernandes examines a specific courtroom scene involving the characters Caetano, Jakki, and Arius. Fernandes observes that while the legal arguments and oratory within the scene are well-crafted, the outcome of the scene is quite straightforward, leading to a reduction in the overall impact of the dramatic effect. In contrast, he considers the first part to be more compelling from a dramatic standpoint, as it incorporates unexpected narrative elements.

Additionally, Fernandes notes that the innovative representation of the Kunbi community, an indigenous group in Goa, in a full-fledged theatrical performance played a pivotal role in capturing the attention of the local audience by offering a fresh perspective on cultural narratives. He also praises the inclusion of authentic Kunbi language and rhythmic musical elements, which he argues made the work particularly appealing to Goan theatergoers. Fernandes' assessment suggests that while the sequel maintains some of the strengths of the original, it does not quite achieve the same level of impact or resonance.
