= Lucasinho Ribeiro =

Goan playwright and theatre actor (1863–1928)

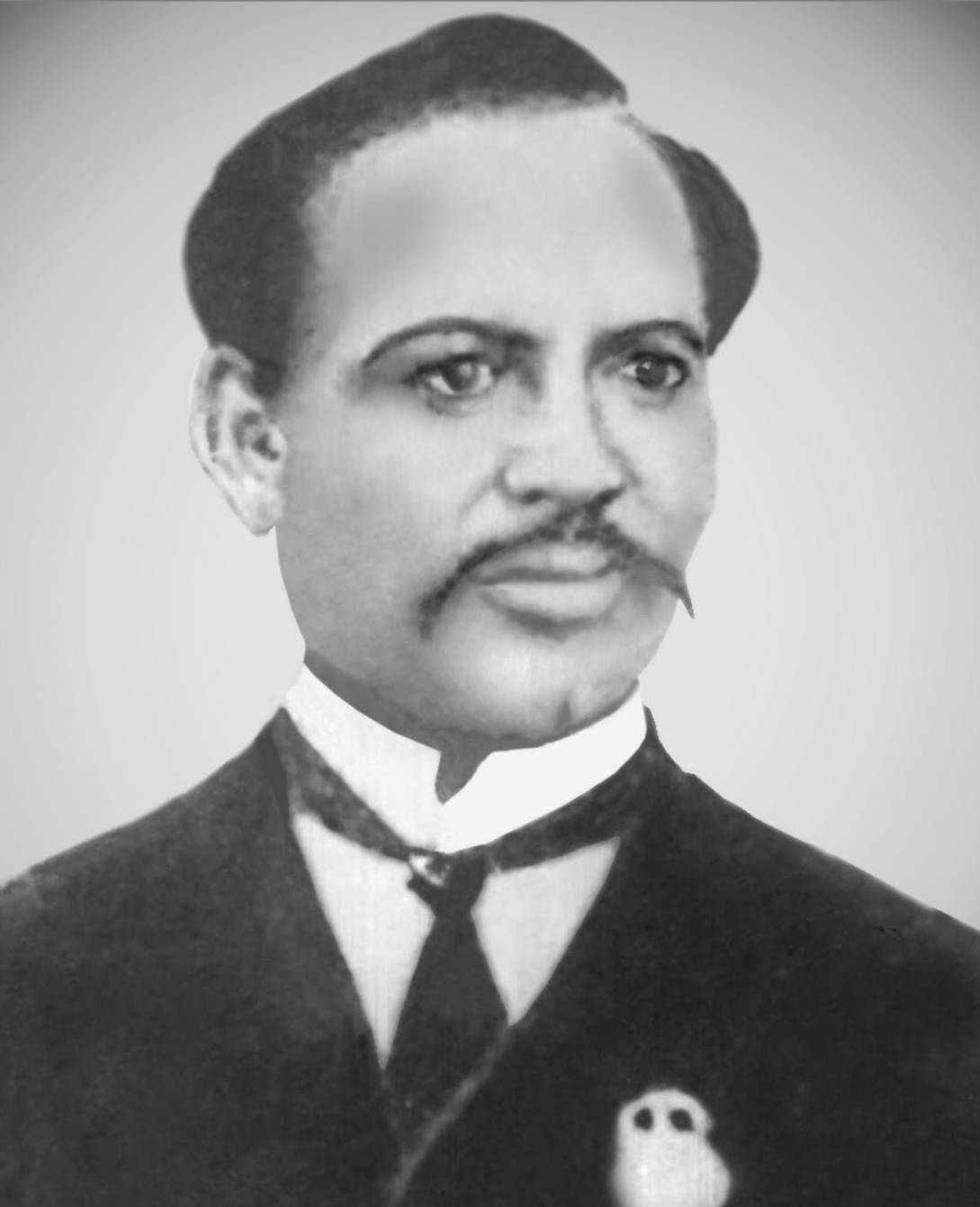
- The only surviving portrait of Ribeiro
- Born: Costâncio Lucasinho Caridade Ribeiro; 2 January 1863; Assagão, Goa, Portuguese India
- Died: 23 January 1928 (aged 65); Assãgao, Goa, Portuguese India
- Other name: Lucasinho Antonio Ribeiro
- Occupations: Playwright; theatre director; actor; singer; composer
- Years active: 1892–1900s
- Notable work: Italian Bhurgo (1892); Batcara (1904)
- Spouse: Filomena de Souza
- Children: 3

Costâncio Lucasinho Caridade Ribeiro (2 January 1863 – 23 January 1928) was a Goan playwright, theatre director, actor, singer, and composer known for staging the first teatro Italian Bhurgo (Italian Boy) on 17 April 1892 in Bombay. Known as a founder of Konkani tiatr, he also staged the first teatro at Assagão, Goa on 1 January 1894.

== Early life ==
Costâncio Lucasinho Caridade Ribeiro was born on 2 January 1863 in Assagão, Bardes, Portuguese Goa.

== Theatrical career ==
=== Background: Early zagor and khell tiatrs ===
During the 19th century, Goa was known for its theatrical performances called zagor and khell. Towards the end of the 19th century, the zagor form of entertainment gained popularity in Bombay, attracting the interest of North Goans. Unfortunately, this form of entertainment was considered crude and vulgar, leading to the embarrassment of the more affluent Goans residing in Bombay. They faced ridicule and mockery from non-Goans, which prompted the middle and upper classes in Bombay to shift their attention to English and Portuguese dramas.

=== Role in Italian Opera Company ===
In 1890, while zagor was still common in Bombay, an Italian Opera Company arrived in the city, presenting performances of high quality in renowned theaters. These Italian operas had good storylines, musical compositions, direction, stage designs, costumes, and lighting effects. These productions attracted a considerable audience, including some well-to-do Goans. It was during this time that Ribeiro, then 27 years old, arrived in Bombay to seek employment. Ribeiro had a strong interest in music and stage arts and was dissatisfied with the condition of Goan entertainment. Comparing the subpar quality of Goan performances to the excellence of the Italian Opera Company, Ribeiro decided that improvements were necessary. However, he encountered many difficulties in Bombay, where he had limited education and few opportunities. Despite these difficulties, he analyzed the differences between Goans and the producers of Italian opera. He questioned why Goans could not create dramas of comparable quality and decided to take steps toward change. Through his personal connections, he obtained a position with the Italian Opera Company, starting as a curtain operator and caretaker or a stagehand. Although the position offered a modest salary, Ribeiro accepted it as it provided him an opportunity to involve himself in theater, observe the artists, and enjoy the music.

=== Italian Bhurgo and other plays ===
During his time with the Italian Opera Company, Ribeiro travelled extensively with the troupe, visiting cities such as Poona, Madras, Simla, and Calcutta in British India. However, when the company planned to travel to British Burma, Ribeiro decided to resign and return to Bombay. By then, he had gained a thorough understanding of one of their operettas, memorizing both, the script and the music. He had also purchased used costumes from the company. Upon his return to Bombay, Ribeiro wrote the first Konkani tiatr, which was a translation of an Italian operetta by the Gonzalez Brothers. Named Italian Bhurgo, this marked the beginning of the Konkani theatrical tradition. Ribeiro collaborated with Caetaninho Fernandes, a young resident of Taleigao, who not only joined Ribeiro's troupe but also assisted in recruiting additional artists. Caetaninho, employed as a clerk at the Bombay Gazette, helped expand the group. The tiatr required a team of nine performers, each assuming multiple roles.

Consequently, Ribeiro, Caetaninho, and João Agostinho Fernandes, a young man from Borda, Margão, employed at a pharmaceutical company in Bombay, began seeking additional artists. This was challenging due to the negative perception associated with Goan zagors, which discouraged potential participants from engaging in Konkani entertainment. However, two additional Goans, Agustinho Mascarenhas from Mungul, Margão, and Fransquino Fernandes, were recruited. Now a team of five, they started planning for the first presentation of a Konkani tiatr. They met for rehearsals each evening after their respective work commitments, near the Round Bungalow on Picket Road in Bombay. Only when they were entirely satisfied with their preparations did they finalize a date for their first performance. On 17 April 1892, the first-ever Konkani tiatr, Italian Bhurgo (The Italian Boy), written and directed by Ribeiro, was performed at the New Alfred Theatre in Bombay. The audience appreciated the production's music, narrative, songs, and the authentic velvet costumes borrowed from the Italian Opera Company. The tiatr's success increased the group's recognition, prompting Ribeiro to name them the Goa Portuguese Dramatic Company.

Encouraged by their initial success, Ribeiro undertook further translations of plays into Konkani, including works such as Alladin Ani Tacho Ojeapancho Divo (Aladdin and the Wonderful Lamp), Alibaba ani Cheallis Chor (Ali Baba and the Forty Thieves), and Carlos Magno (Charlemagne). Ribeiro's proficiency in English helped in the precise translation of these classic English novels in Konkani; they were met with acclaim. The popularity of Konkani tiatr became evident as it attracted support not only in Bombay but also in Goa and among Goans residing elsewhere. Ribeiro then worked to introduce Konkani tiatr to Goa. While historical records from Assagão, Bardez, Ribeiro's birthplace, confirm that the first Konkani tiatr in Goa was staged in Assagão in 1894, it remains uncertain whether the performance was Italian Burgo or one of the other three plays translated by Ribeiro. This performance took place on New Year's Day, 1 January 1894, and featured artists such as Napoleanv, Manuel Jose Fonseca, Zeferine Andrade, Tolentino Fonseca, and L. J. Rapose. The musical accompaniment for this tiatr was provided by Mestre Gabriel Franco. Subsequently, Ribeiro went on to produce numerous tiatrs at Sokol-Vaddear in Assagão, Goa.

=== Introduction of teatro in Goa ===
The Konkani tiatr originated in Goa under the leadership of Ribeiro, making him the first Goan to introduce this theatrical form in the region. As Ribeiro's influence grew, the Konkani tiatr gradually spread to other parts of Goa. Inspired by Ribeiro, João Agostinho Fernandes from Borda, Margao, began writing and staging tiatrs in Bombay, where he improved his skills under Ribeiro's tutelage. While Ribeiro focused on translating established English and Portuguese plays into Konkani, Fernandes distinguished himself by creating original tiatrs. Fernandes openly acknowledged Ribeiro as his mentor in Konkani tiatrs, as evident in his writings for Konkani newspapers of the time, such as Ave Maria. One notable production by Fernandes was Batcara, which premiered on 22 November 1904, at the Gaiety Theatre in Bombay. The play featured Ribeiro as one of the actors, alongside Policarpo Mendonca, N.M. Fernandes, Anton Abranv, and Regina Fernandes, who became the first Goan woman to perform in Konkani tiatrs.

=== Closure of Ribeiro and Cruz Opera Company ===
The success of these early pioneers led to the formation of several new tiatr groups, reflecting the growing popularity and interest in the Konkani tiatr. Among these groups were Lusitan, Dona Amelia, Don Carlos, Douglas Cornic Opera, Karachiwallas Delectable Company, Goan Union, Lazarus Comic Opera, and Goa Nacional. However, conflicts and jealousy emerged among Ribeiro's group members, possibly influenced by external factors. Motivated by unsubstantiated rumours, Ribeiro decided to end his professional relationship with his long-term associates, including Caetaninho Fernandes, João Agostinho Fernandes, Agostinho Mascarenhas, and Fransquino Fernandes. He formed a new group called the Ribeiro and Cruz Opera Company, leaving his former colleagues without guidance.

This period also witnessed the rise and subsequent decline of numerous Konkani drama/opera companies. While some, like the Union Jack Drama Company led by A.J. Rocha, lasted longer, many others ceased operations within a few years, including the Ribeiro and Cruz Opera Company. After its closure, Ribeiro appears to have ceased translating English plays or producing new works in Konkani. Despite his continued involvement as an actor in João Agostinho Fernandes's productions in later years, there is no record of Ribeiro's own productions during this period. Although Ribeiro possessed a substantial collection of written material, including tiatr scripts and related documents, stored in a wooden box at his home in Assagão, Bardez, the current location of this box remains unknown. It is presumed that it may have been destroyed by pests or stolen. Konkani Historian and singer Wilson Mazarello writes that the loss of this valuable material deprives us of a deeper understanding of Ribeiro's artistic vision and contributions to the Konkani tiatr. Towards the end of his career, Ribeiro wrote and directed five tiatrs, including works such as Italian Bhurgo, Alibaba ani Cheallis Chor, and Carlos Magno. He was also a composer and singer of tiatr songs. In addition, Ribeiro continued his acting career, appearing in both his own productions and those of João Agostinho Fernandes.

== Personal life ==
Ribeiro was also an artist, known for his skills as both a painter and a portrait artist. The artistic skill of Ribeiro was acknowledged by the Portuguese government, leading to a commission to create portraits of two former governors. However, Ribeiro's primary creative passion laid in the world of Konkani tiatr, a form of Goan theater. He remained committed to this art form throughout his life.

Ribeiro was married to Filomena de Souza, and together they had three sons: Caetano Paulo, Teofilio, and Joaquim Menino. Caetano Paulo Ribeiro and Joaquim Menino Ribeiro, the latter commonly referred to as "Jack," followed his father and performed in tiatrs. Jack was also a commercial artist, involved in crafting posters and portraits specifically for tiatr performances. The tiatr community thus referred to him as "painter J. Ribeiro".

== Plays ==
| Year | Title | Location | Notes |
|---|---|---|---|
| 1892 | Italian Bhurgo | New Alfred Theatre, Bombay | Writer & director; Translation of an Italian operetta by the Gonzalez Brothers |
| | Alladin Ani Tacho Ojeapancho Divo | Bombay | Writer & director; Translation of Alladin |
| | Alibaba ani Cheallis Chor | Bombay | Writer & director; Translation of Ali Baba and the Forty Thieves |
| | Carlos Magno | Bombay | Writer & director; Translation of an English novel, presumably based on Charlemagne |
| 1894 | Untitled teatro | Sokol Vaddo, Assãgao, Goa | Writer & director; restaging of Italian Bhurgo or the other three plays |
| 1904 | Batcara | Gaiety Theatre, Bombay | Credited as an actor |
