= Pai Tiatrist =

Goan playwright and actor (1871–1947)

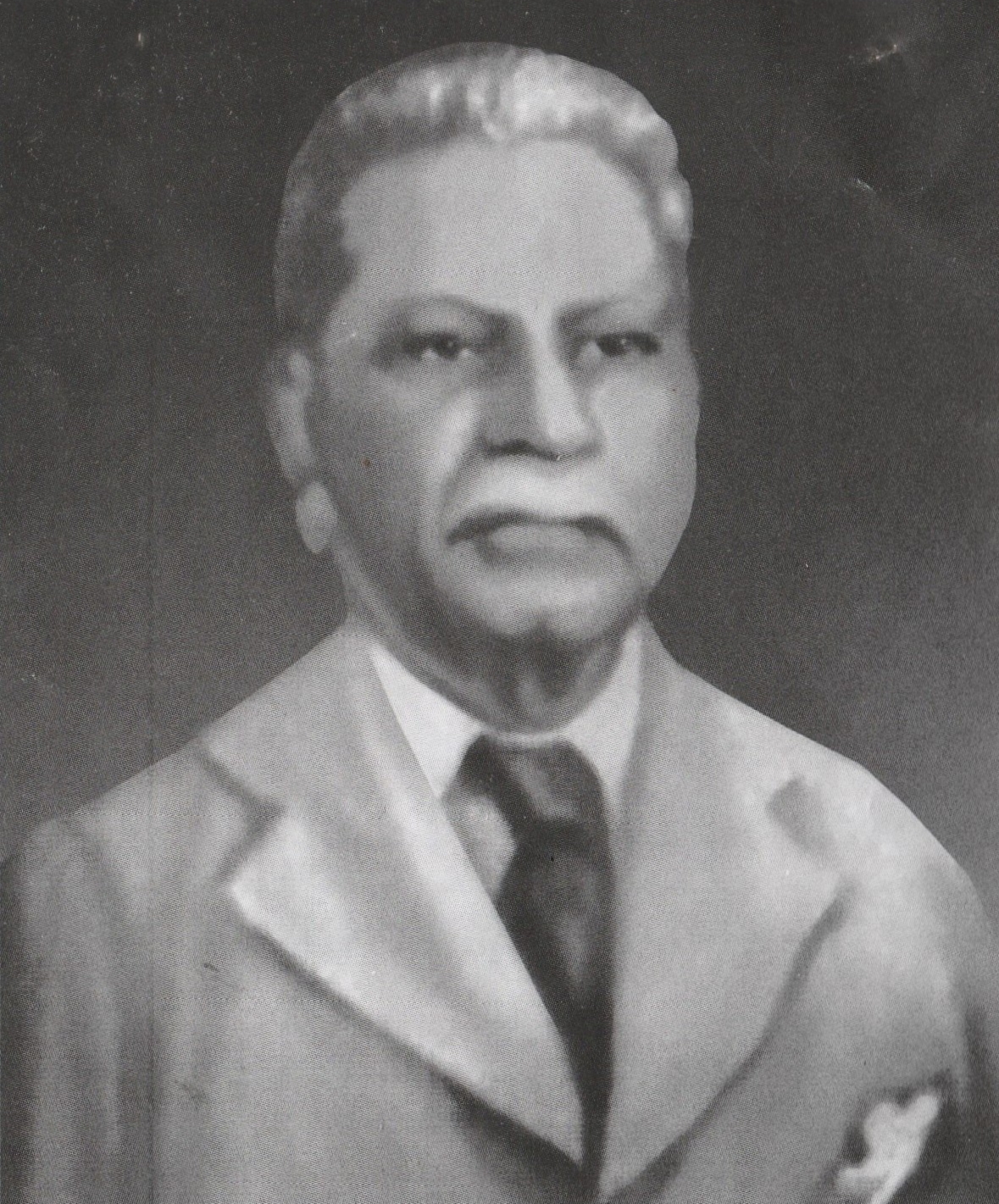
- Portrait of Fernandes from the 20th century
- Born: João Agostinho Fernandes; 14 December 1871; Margão, Goa, Portuguese India
- Died: 29 August 1947 (aged 75); Goculdas Tejpal Hospital, Bombay, Dominion of India
- Other names: Comic Fernandes; J.A. Fernandes
- Education: St. Xavier's School, Dhobitalao
- Occupations: Playwright; actor
- Years active: 1892–1947
- Employer(s): Messrs Phillips and Company, Bombay
- Spouse: Regina Fernandes (m. 1892; died 1908) Luiza Colaço (m. 1909)
- Children: 8

João Agostinho Fernandes (Note: According to the baptism register from 1871 at the Holy Spirit Church, Margao, Agustinho was recorded as his middle name. However, Fernandes personally spelled it with an 'o' instead of 'u', so the spelling has been changed to Agostinho. Portuguese names may vary in spelling due to the availability of diacritical marks like ~ and ¸ on typewriters and the knowledge of computer typists to use them, for example João or Conceição.) (14 December 1871 – 29 August 1947), popularly known as Pai Tiatrist (lit. 'Father Tiatrist'), was a Goan playwright, theatre actor, and former chemist. Referred to as the "Father of Konkani tiatr", he is known for his contribution to the first teatro, Italian Bhurgo (transl. Italian Boy). The play was first performed on 17 April 1892 in Bombay at the New Alfred Theatre, along with playwright Lucasinho Ribeiro, Caitaninho Fernandes, and Agostinho Mascarenhas. (Note: Five individuals participated in the production of the first teatro. At the time of the book When the Curtains Rise was published in 2010, the last person involved was unknown. However, Brazinho Soares Kalapurkar's subsequent research uncovered the identity of the fifth artiste as Fransquino Fernandes, who performed in the initial teatro Italian Bhurgo.)

Fernandes continued the tiatr tradition when his mentor Ribeiro quit being part of Konkani theatre during the early 20th century. Over a span of more than fifty years, he created 30 plays, with the majority being original works crafted by him, totaling 26, while the remaining four were adaptations from external sources.

== Early life ==
João Agostinho Fernandes was born on 14 December 1871, in Margão, Portuguese Goa. His baptism took place a week later. His mother, Maria Francisca, was a native of Portuguese Macau, while his father, Conceiçao Fernandes, worked as a mariner. Initially, there was some confusion regarding his date of birth, as it was erroneously linked to his baptism on 21 December 1871. Fernandes received his primary education in the Portuguese language and initially pursued studies at the Rachol Seminary. However, he later opted to discontinue his education there and relocated to Bombay. In Bombay, he completed his matriculation at St. Xavier's School in Dhobitalao and subsequently secured employment as a chemist at Messrs Phillips and Company, (Note: On 13 June 1916, Fernandes released Batcara Part II while employed at Messrs Phillips and Company. He proposed to supply the music for the play at a low cost and used the company's contact information for the arrangement.) where he gained experience over the course of several years.

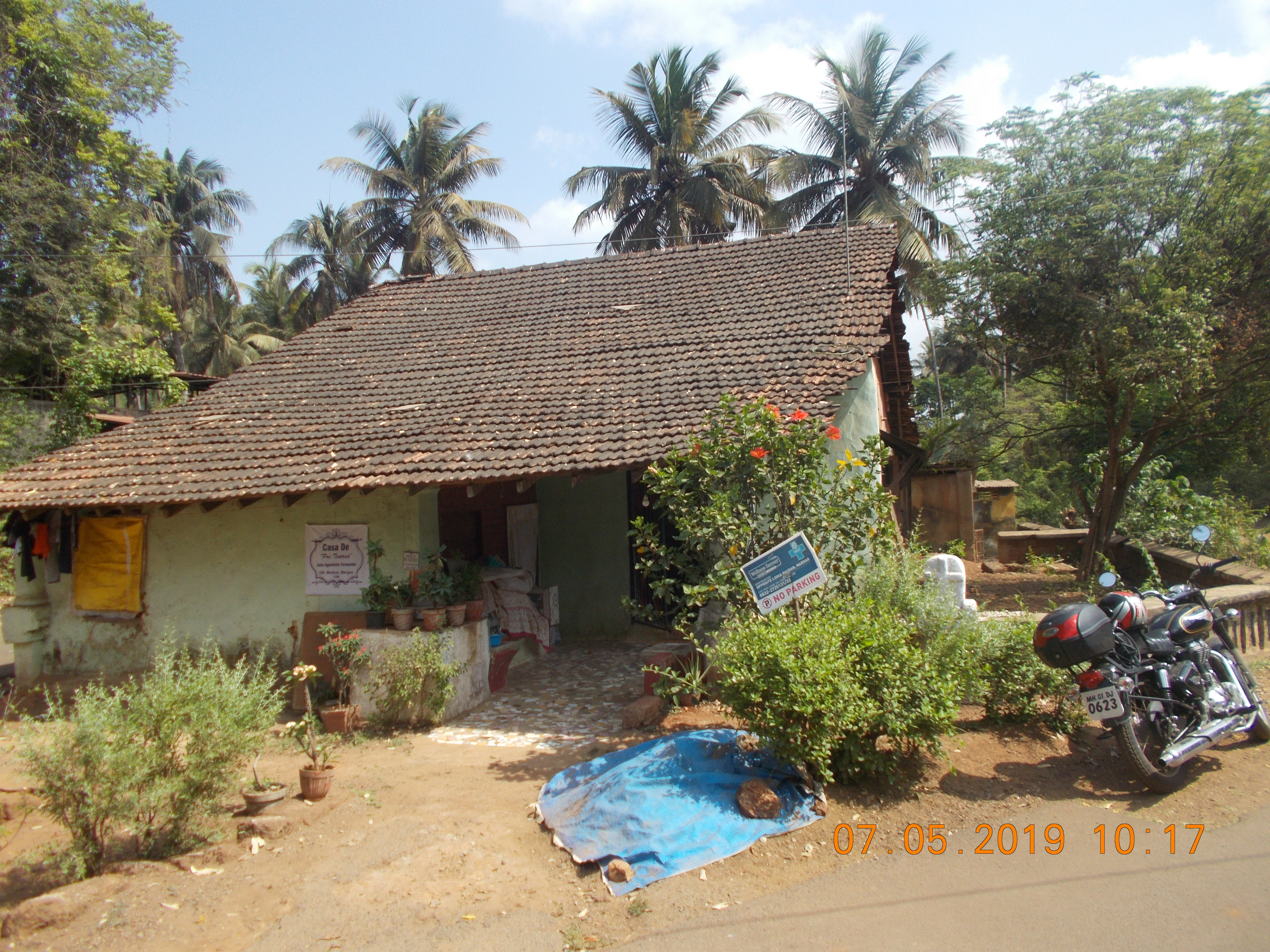
Fernandes's residence located at Modsai, Margao, Goa in 2019.

Using his acquired knowledge, Fernandes began working with a Parsi individual, starting a business of importing pharmaceutical drugs from France. The establishment, named Shorabji Hormusji and Company, operated a drug store situated at Crawford Market, situated opposite the Jama Masjid. Fernandes's proficiency in the French language likely proved advantageous in facilitating business correspondence related to this enterprise. Unfortunately, he encountered treachery from his partner and consequently severed ties. Fernandes then sought new opportunities by joining Sequeira and Sons, another company operating in a similar field. However, the business faced a setback when the British Government of colonial India imposed a ban on the importation of drugs from France. As a result, Fernandes and his associate found themselves compelled to cease operations and close down their business.

== Theatrical career ==
Fernandes achieved several milestones in his career. In 1908, he became the first individual to record songs in the Konkani language when he collaborated with His Master's Voice. His daughter Sophia accompanied him in the recording sessions. Recognizing the importance of preserving his theatrical works, Fernandes proactively published his plays. In 1909, his play Batcara I (The Landlord I) was printed, and he further distributed a printed album containing sixteen songs along with their musical notations. Fernandes then published Batcara II on 13 June 1916. Subsequently, in January 1937, a compilation of three of his plays, namely Battkara, Ven(eravel) Padr José Vaz, and Dotichem Kestaum, was released in a single volume.

Fernandes's also planned the printing of several other theatrical works, categorized into distinct volumes. Among them, Volume Two encompassed Battcara Part II, Bebddo (The Drunkard), Belle of Cavel, and Pandurang Kusmonncar. Volume Three included Geraldina, Rukmibai, Ranneanchem Traisaum, and Paichi Dusri Bail. Volume Four featured Vauraddi (The Labourer), Kunbi Jaki, and Cazar Matarponnar. In Volume Five, he published Mozo Khapri Chakor, Professor Leitaum, and Bomboicho Telegrafist. Fernandes also translated notable works, such as Dongui Voiz by Molière and Teg Zann Tubbokar by Alexander Dumas. Notably, Fernandes personally undertook the printing of Kunbi Jaki, one of his most acclaimed plays, which showcased the lifestyle and capabilities of indigenous communities.

On 11 September 1941, Fernandes, perhaps motivated by the loss or theft of three of his plays, took measures to secure copyright protection for one of his works. In response, John Sargent, Esquire, M.A., C.I.E., a Joint secretary to the Government of India, Department of Education, Health and Lands in New Delhi, informed Fernandes on 25 September of the absence of a formal copyright registration system in British India. However, Sargent clarified that copyright protection was granted automatically under the provisions of the Indian Copyright Act of 1914. Fernandes's play, Kunbi Jaki, has since been included in the publication Tiatrancho Jhelo by the Goa Konkani Akademi.

== Impact as a hyperpolyglot ==
Fernandes's literary works in the Konkani language were significantly influenced by early studies in Portuguese. This influence had an impact on the syntax of Konkani used by him, resulting in a distinct lyrical and poetic quality in Fernandes's writing. The incorporation of a substantial number of Portuguese words into Konkani further contributed to the plays' historical charm. Fernandes demonstrated a conscientious approach to language evolution, updating the vocabulary in his works to reflect contemporary usage through revisions made over time.

Fernandes's proficiency in French allowed him to use it in his early romantic comedies, as seen in The Belle of Cavel. In addition to Portuguese and French, he incorporated Hindustani and Latin into his dramas whenever the narrative demanded their usage, as seen in The Belle of Cavel and Kunbi Jakki, respectively. Fernandes's skill in English is seen in his plays, songs, and promotional material for the tiatrs. Notably, in the composition of Rukmibhai (also known as Broken Promise or The Broken Heart) in June 1926 in Margão, all stage directions were provided in English by him.

== Philanthropy ==
Fernandes was known for his generosity, often prioritizing the well-being of others over personal financial gain in his theatrical endeavors. His son, Anthony, attested to Fernandes's commitment to ensuring adequate remuneration for the artists involved, even if he himself did not receive a portion of the earnings. Many of Fernandes's plays were dedicated to serving social or charitable causes.

On 22 November 1904, Fernandes's play Batcara was staged to mark the inauguration of the Goan Union Dramatic Club. Subsequently, on 7 December 1915, a re-enactment of the same play was organized to raise funds for the Women's War Relief Fund of the Goan Ladies Circle. Similarly, the proceeds from the performance of Bebdo at the Gaiety Theatre on 8 October 1925, were allocated towards establishing a scholarship at St. Sebastian Goan High School in Dabul.

On 21 January 1927, Fernandes presented Geraldina at Harmonia Hall, Borda, Goa, with the purpose of supporting the Lepers Home in Macazana, Salcete. Likewise, on 15 May 1932, The Belle of Cavel vo Sundor Cheddum Cavelchem was staged in Margão to benefit the Vauraddeanche Ekvottachea Fundac (Workers Unity Fund), also known as the Sociedade dos Operarios de Goa.

Fernandes presented a performance of the aforementioned play at Princess Theatre in Bhangwadi, Bombay, on 27 September 1938, with the proceeds contributing to the Instituto Luso-Indiano. On 9 April 1940, the play Vauraddi was staged at Princess Theatre, Bhangwadi, in aid of the Society of Nossa Senhora de Piedade in Dabul. Additionally, on 5 November 1940, Batcara was performed at Princess Theatre under the patronage of Sir Homi Mody, KBE, and with the support of the Instituto Luso-Indiano, to benefit the Bombay War Gifts Fund.

Following the devastating impact of a cyclone that caused widespread suffering in Goa, particularly affecting areas such as Arossim, Cansaulim, Majorda, Colva, Betalbatim, and Carmona, the Goa Flood Relief Fund Committee took action to provide aid and support to those who had been left homeless and impoverished. To achieve this objective, the committee organized a charitable event on 16 February 1941, at the St Xavier's College Hall in Bombay. The primary purpose of this event was to raise funds for the cyclone victims. To attract donations, the committee arranged a performance of the play Leopold and Carolin or Vauraddi, written by Fernandes. Handbills were distributed to promote the event, inviting both Goans and sympathizers to contribute to this philanthropic cause by purchasing tickets. Attendees would enjoy a three-hour entertainment experience at a reasonable price, and the proceeds from ticket sales would be directed towards the relief efforts. Another theatrical production, Bebdo, was organized on 2 May 1943, in Mapuça, Goa, with the aim of benefiting the Oxel church. A decade later, on 25 January 1957, A. R. Souza Ferrão, a devoted follower of Fernandes, directed a revival of Bebdo to support the Goan Social Welfare League.

== Personal life ==
Fernandes was married twice. Regina Fernandes, his first wife, is regarded to be the first woman actress in the history of Konkani theater, debuting in the play Batcara at Bombay's Gaiety Theatre in 1904. They got married on 22 August 1892 at the St. Francis Xavier Church in Dabul, Bombay. At the time of their marriage, Regina was 12 years old, while Fernandes was 20. Regina died due to an illness on 20 December 1908, after a twelve-day battle. Together, they had two sons named Michael and Manuel, and two daughters named Sophia and Annie.

Following the loss of his first wife, Fernandes married Luiza Maria Colaço (b. 1892) of Seraulim. She was 16 years old when they got married on 3 March 1909, leaving an age disparity of eighteen years between them. Together, they bore four children: Anthony (Antonelio), Rosy, Tereza, and Eugene. Luiza Maria actively participated in Fernandes's plays. Moreover, their children and granddaughters continued the tradition of actively participating in theatre.

== Death ==
On Friday, 29 August 1947, a fortnight after India achieved its independence, Fernandes died at Goculdas Tejpal Hospital in Bombay.

== Legacy ==
In honour of Fernandes's contributions, the Goa Konkani Akademi annually organizes the Tiatr Manuscript Writing Competition. Furthermore, the Government of Goa has chosen to commemorate Fernandes by bestowing his name upon the auditorium located at Ravindra Bhavan in Margao. Hence, the venue is now recognized as the Pai Tiatrist João Agostinho Fernandes Auditorium. (Note: The cultural center Ravindra Bhavan in Margao officially refers to the auditorium as the Pai Tiatrist Joao Agustinho Fernandes Auditorium, but other sources indicate that the correct name is the Pai Tiatrist Joao Agostinho Fernandes Auditorium.)

The legacy of Fernandes's work, particularly his play Pandurong Kusmonnkar, can be observed in the present-day portrayal of Hindu characters and their accents in tiatr performances. This artistic style was subsequently inherited by individuals such as Souza Ferrão. Fernandes holds the distinction of being the first to introduce Kunbi dances and songs to the stage, incorporating original rhythms. Among his compositions, the song "Sintidan paim ghal re, Jaki...." from Kunbi Jaki achieved significant popularity among the general public due to its vibrant and engaging rhythm.

== Plays ==
Year	Title	Location	Notes
1892	Italian Bhurgo	New Alfred Theatre, Bombay	Professional debut
1893	The Belle of Cavel	Bombay	Debut as writer
1897	Revolt De Sattari or Ranneanchem Traisaum	Bombay	
1897	Cazar Matarponnar	Bombay	One-act farce; rev. 1942, 1943
1898, 1901	Bebdo	Bombay	Rev. 1942, Margao
1904	Batcara		The print version was published by L. M. Furtado and Sons in Bombay in 1909. Later revised in 1932, and reprinted as part of João Agostinho Fernandes-ache Drama, Comed ani Farsam: Battkara, Veneravel Padr José Vaz and Dotichem Kestaum, Volume I in 1937 by Ave Maria P.
1905	Batcara II		The print version was published by Victoria P. Works in Bombay in 1916
1908	Dhotichem Kestaum	Gaiety Theatre, Bori Bunder	The print version is available in Volume I
1910	Pandurang Kusmonncar		Rewritten in Bombay in 1941
1913	Nid Naslolo Bomboicho Telegraphis	Bombay	Farce
1914	Professor Leitao	Bombay	One-act farce
1925	Geraldina	Bombay	
1926	Rukmibai	Margão	
1927	Noureamcho Bazar	Margão	One-act farce
1931	Dhongui Voiz	Margão	Translation of Molière
	American Minstrels/Khapreachem Band		Created before 1909 as Hispano-American War Minstrels; rev. 1931, Margão
1932	Josefina or Paichi Dusri Bail	Margão	
1933	Vauraddi	Margão	
1934	Kunbi Jakki	Margão	
1936	Veneravel Padre José Vaz	Margão	The print version is available in Volume I
	Mozo Khapri Chakor	Margão	One-act farce, rewritten in Bombay in 1939
1940	Deu Naslolo Communist	Bombay	
1941	Goan Ponch, Part I	Bombay	One-act farce
1941	Kunbi Jakki Part II	Bombay	Rev. 1945, Margao
1942	Hirmigild or 'Modian Ratcho Deuchar	Margão	Three-act play
1944	Tandulanchem Kestaum	Margão	Rev. 1945
1945	Goan Ponch Part II	Margão	Two-acts farcial sketch
	Sociedade de Rom Tom		There are no copies of this work available, as it is believed to have been stolen. It is noted on the title page of Batcara, suggesting that it must have been written before 1909, when Batcara was published.
	Teg Bondukka		Translation of The Three Musketeers, no full copy available
	Mothes Tiu		Translated work, no copy available
	Henry VIII		Translated work, no copy available
