= Batcara II =

1911 Konkani play by Pai Tiatrist

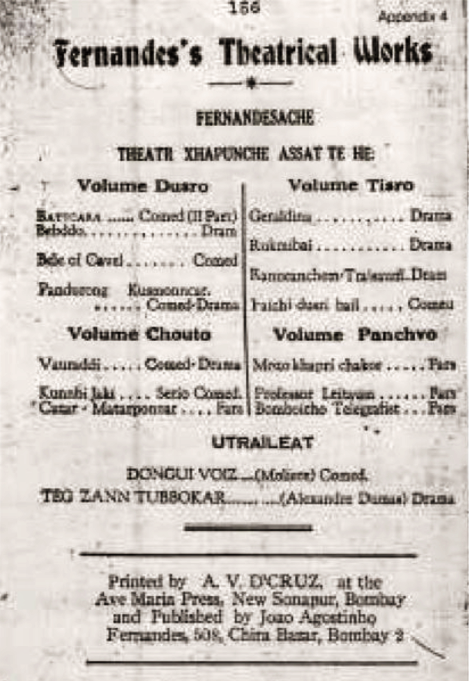
- The play is mentioned in Volume Dusro (Second Volume) of Fernandes's works, c. 1940s
- Written by: João Agostinho Fernandes
- Characters: Casiano; Casmiro; Cecilia; Maurico; Esmeralda; Ernesto; Bhat; Sundori; Pudlick
- Original language: Konkani
- Series: Bebdo; The Belle of Cavel; Pandurang Kusmonncar
- Subject: Inter-caste marriages, and acceptance of Western culture by Goan Hindus
- Genre: Tiatr, comedy drama
- Setting: Goa, and Bombay

Premiere
- Date premiered: 23 May 1911
- Place premiered: Gaiety Theatre, Bombay, British India

Batcara II is a Konkani play written by the Goan playwright João Agostinho Fernandes. It serves as a sequel to his 1904 play of the same name. The play was penned in 1905 and premiered on 23 May 1911 at the Gaiety Theatre in Bombay. It was subsequently published on 13 June 1916. Unlike the first part, this play is structured into nine scenes rather than acts. The plot continues the story from the original play, focusing on the main characters Casiano and his son Casmiro. Through their experiences with the Goan Union, the play depicts the duo's efforts to bring reforms to the region. The work also addresses themes of inter-caste marriages and other social reforms undertaken by the Hindu community in Goa during this period.

== Characters ==
Casiano Rodrigues is a wealthy Goan landlord from Panzarim, Goa. He has inherited and owns several ancestral properties and is a member of the Goan Union in Bombay, a social welfare association.

Roza Maria Luiza Vaz is Casiano's wife. She is a housewife by profession.

Casmiro Rodrigues is the only child and heir of Casiano and Roza. He is a former banker and a member of the Goan Union. He is married to Cecilia Miranda.

Cecilia Miranda is Casmiro's wealthy wife. She is rebellious in nature and abstains from engaging in household duties by pointing to the sizable dowry she possesses.

Maurico is Esmeralda's father. He is a Catholic belonging to a higher-caste family and is against his daughter's inter-caste marriage.

Esmeralda is a young woman who believes in exogamy and wishes to marry Ernesto.

Ernesto is Esmeralda's lover and belongs to a Catholic family of a lower caste.

Bhat is the patriarch of the Bhat family. He is a Hindu man, father of Sundori, and is supportive of the reforms taking place within Hindu society in Goa.

Sundori Bhat is Pudlick's wife. She is against the social reforms taking place regarding Hindus, which is much different from her father's views.

Pudlick is the husband of Sundori. He is a young, educated Hindu who is a reformer. He is part of a cohort of young individuals challenging societal norms by wearing shoes and Western clothing, activities considered taboo among Hindus, despite facing resistance from traditionalists.

== Plot summary ==
Casiano, the landlord, has undergone a profound transformation characterized by a newfound sensitivity towards the needs of the underprivileged members of society. This change in perspective has led him to prioritize fair wages for his workers and advocate for the dignity of labor. Furthermore, he has adopted a more open-minded stance towards mixed marriages. Casiano is also contemplative about being held accountable for his life by a higher authority in the future. In an effort to promote social change, he works towards broadening the Goan Union's membership.

The play delves deeper into Casmiro's personal life, revealing his wife Cecilia Miranda's discontent with domestic duties and her sense of pride in her sizeable dowry insinuate a belief that she should not be beholden to anyone. The resulting strain in their relationship is alleviated when Casmiro implores for understanding until the completion of property paperwork that favors them. The reformers, such as Casiano and his son Casmiro, both landowners in Panzarim, are actively involved in implementing changes in their hometown of Goa. Their endeavors are depicted in the production, showcasing not just inter-caste marriages but also emphasizing the progressive transformation occurring within Hindu society in the colony of Goa. Educated youths from the Hindu community embark on a mission to challenge long-standing customs concerning footwear and Western clothing.

Despite facing pushback from conservative factions, they champion the cause of advocating for the remarriage of bodkis, Hindu widows who traditionally shave their heads. The play also provide more details on intercaste marriages. Maurico demonstrates acceptance towards his daughter Esmeralda's intercultural marriage with Ernesto. In a comparable fashion, Bhat imparts guidance to his daughter Sundori regarding the incorporation of her husband Pudlick's contemporary principles and convictions. Initially resistant to societal shifts, Maurico and Sundori eventually embrace change, contrasting with families like the Bhat family who find resolution for their disagreements through the embrace of traditional religious rituals and practices.

== History of the play ==
The premiere performance took place in Bombay and was promoted as a musical comedy presented in English. The premiere featured a cast of five actresses: A. Mascarenhas, Sophia Fernandes, Luiza Maria Fernandes, Ernestina Morena, and Annie Fernandes. Sophia and Annie were the daughters of João Agostinho Fernandes, while Luiza was his second wife. The production had a complex backstory. It was initially penned in 1905; however, a series of obstacles hindered its production during that period. In 1908, an official declaration was issued in Poona regarding the upcoming performance of the play Bebdo. Despite initial plans, the play did not come to fruition as anticipated. It was not until 23 May 1911 that the Goan Amateurs Dramatic Club successfully presented Batara II at the Gaiety Theatre in Bombay, following a series of delays. The favorable response from the audience was probably influenced by the fact that the play served as a continuation or follow-up to the first production. On the occasion of a performance, H. E. Visconde de Wrem, who served as the Consul General of Portugal in British India, attended the play and found it entertaining, as noted by historian Wilson Mazarello.

== Legacy ==
The plays Batcara II and its predecessor are considered to be among the earliest known artistic works that provide representations and insights into the landlord-tenant farmer/labourer (Konkani: bhatcar-mundcar) relationship, an intrinsic component ingrained in the cultural heritage, historical evolution, and societal fabric of Goa. These plays are frequently referenced and used as sources to understand the dynamics of this relationship. In addition to the bhatcar-mundcar dynamic, the plays have also offered perspectives on the role of the caste system in shaping the socio-economic relations within Goan society. Academic research has further explored the significance and influence of these dramatic works, such as the papers "Vimala Devi's Bhatcars and the Mundcars" (2021) by Dale Luis Menezes, published by Georgetown University in the United States, and "Agriculture in Curtorim" (2022) by Professor Favita Rochelle Dias, published by Goa University in India.
