= Kunbi Jakki =

1941 Konkani play by Pai Tiatrist

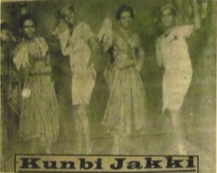
- A scene from the play featuring the Kunbis
- Written by: João Agostinho Fernandes
- Characters: Jakki; Costaum; Arius; Roque; Bostean; Consaum; Puddu; Inas
- Original language: Konkani
- Series: Vauraddi; Cazar Matarponnar
- Subject: Discrimination faced by Kunbis and educated poor people
- Genre: Tiatr, comedy drama
- Setting: Local administrative office and bungalow in Portuguese Goa

Premiere
- Date premiered: 21 November 1941
- Place premiered: Princess Theatre, Bhangwadi, Bombay

Kunbi Jakki is a four-act Konkani play written by the Goan playwright João Agostinho Fernandes. The play was originally written in August 1934 in Margão, Goa. It later received its initial public performance on 21 November 1941 at the Princess Theatre in Bhangwadi, Bombay. The play went on to become one of the acclaimed and commercially successful works in Fernandes' dramatic oeuvre. Kunbi Jakki had a minimum of three showings while Fernandes was alive and was later revived for an additional showing in 1954 posthumously. Fernandes' son, Tony was responsible for both adapting and producing the work for a radio broadcast that took place on All India Radio in Bombay on 11 May 1953. The play represents the sole published work by Fernandes for which the playwright sought formal copyright protection, filing the paperwork in September 1941.

== Characters ==
Jakki is the son of Inas and Consaum. He is a young Kunbi who is a middle school graduate but is denied a white-collar job and later opts for manual labor. He is the future husband of Puddu and the main protagonist.

Costaum is a Kunbi who is the father-in-law of Jakki. He is a humorous man who works at Rom Tom Society. He is illiterate, and the father of Puddu, and husband of Bostean. He admires Jakki for serving as a positive example for other Kunbis to follow.

Arius is the devil in human disguise. He establishes a pact with Jakki outlining a potential consequence where Jakki and his spouse would be obligated to serve him as vassals in the event of Jakki's payment default. Arius advocates anti-Christianism to the couple. He compels them to cease adhering to Christian doctrines and the donning of religious symbols like the brown scapular. He is the main antagonist.

Roque is a corrupt secretary who works at Rom Tom Society, a local administrative office. He demonstrates a bias towards individuals of higher social standing while showing prejudice against those from disadvantaged backgrounds. He later becomes jobless and a vassal of Arius.

Bostean is Costaum's wife and Puddu's mother. She emphasizes the importance of receiving a substantial bride-price for her daughter's hand in marriage. She is a minor character.

Consaum is Jakki's mother and the wife of Inas. She is of a Kunbi background and is a minor character.

Puddu is the daughter of Bostean and Costaum. She is a young woman who lacks literacy but holds steadfast religious convictions. She engages in a disagreement with Arius and is part of a spiritual confraternity. She is the future wife of Jakki.

Inas is a Kunbi who is the father of Jakki and the husband of Consaum. He is from a poor and illiterate background and cannot afford his son's further studies.

== Plot summary ==
Jakki is a young Kunbi man who is the son of Inas and Consaum. Despite being educated, he has faced difficulties in securing white-collar employment. However, Jakki maintains a steadfast belief in the dignity of manual labor as a vital method for providing for himself and his family, demonstrating dedication in his approach to work. Jakki has received a marriage proposal from a woman named Puddu, whom he finds to be beautiful. In pursuit of matrimony with her, he demonstrates a willingness to confront challenges and engage in strenuous efforts to achieve his goal. Jakki takes a bold step by agreeing to a loan from Arius, with the condition that if Jakki is unable to repay the loan, both he and his wife will be obligated to serve Arius as their lord. The situation has a Faustian quality, as Jakki appears to be making a deal with the devil. However, Jakki's strategic prowess emerges as he overcomes the obstacles presented by Arius and Roque, steering the plot through its progression towards a decisive conclusion.

Roque holds the position of a secretary in the Rom Tom Society, embodying the elitist and casteist aspects of society. He is inclined to mistreat and create challenges for the underprivileged and marginalized members of the community and is an inequitable and unethical man who unjustly withholds employment from qualified candidates and engages in bribery. Costaum's role in the play primarily revolves around delivering comedic relief. Through his witty remarks and interactions with various characters, including those of higher education and his peers, he injects humor into the narrative consistently. Costaum's lack of literacy does not hinder his ability to cleverly play with Portuguese words, creating humorous puns that resonate when articulated in the Konkani language. Costaum showcases his wit by succinctly describing the secondary school teachers to his wife Bostean as men with long beards, bald heads, and potbellies. Despite his own lack of formal education, he greatly admires his son-in-law Jakki's education and uses him as an example of a successful and educated member of the Kunbi community.

Arius is depicted as a devil-like figure in human form. He lures Jakki, with the temptation of immediate financial support for his impending nuptials, as well as the assurance of unlimited prosperity in the future. However, Arius sets a rigorous term for the loan arrangement, outlining that if Jakki is unable to fulfill the repayment, both Jakki and his wife will face the prospect of physical and spiritual servitude under his control. In an attempt to influence Jakki's decisions regarding his wedding arrangements, Arius advises against holding the ceremony in a church and wearing religious symbols like the brown scapular. He further suggests to Puddu, the bride of Jakki, to contemplate substituting her scapular with a diamond necklace. In addition to his significant role in the primary conflict of the play, Arius conveys his anti-Christian philosophical beliefs by discussing various ideologies such as Materialism, Spiritualism, Rationalism, Egoism, Atheism, Pantheism, Fetishism, Bolshevism, Socialism, Communism, and Casteism. The source of Arius' own name is also linked to the historical Christian heresy of Arianism.

In contrast, Puddu, the wife of Jakki, is as an uneducated woman steadfast in her religious beliefs. She remains unwavering in her spiritual convictions, resisting the advances of Arius. During confrontations with Arius, Puddu emerges victorious. During a crucial juncture, Arius compels Roque to carry out the action of stabbing Jakki. Puddu implores for divine intervention through her prayers. Yet, when Jakki exposes the brown scapular he wears on his chest, Roque hesitates. Subsequently, Puddu reveals her own scapular. The presence of these religious emblems prompts both Arius and Roque to hastily retreat out of fear. This occurrence highlights the value of the religious faith that the priest had imbued in Puddu during her membership in the spiritual confraternity. Her commitment to her beliefs ultimately triumphs over the corrupt forces represented by Arius and Roque.

== Legacy ==
In 2014, on the occasion of Goa Liberation Day, the Goa Philatelic and Numismatics Society (GPNS) released a commemorative postal cover as part of the GOAPEX 2014 philatelic exhibition. The cover displayed an illustration depicting a moment from Kunbi Jakki, according to GPNS president Dr. M. R. Ramesh Kumar. Also in same month of December, Goa-based writer Willy Goes authored a novel in the Konkani language named Kapaz Jaki, drawing inspiration from the work Kunbi Jakki.
