= Bebdo (play) =

1901 Konkani play by Pai Tiatrist

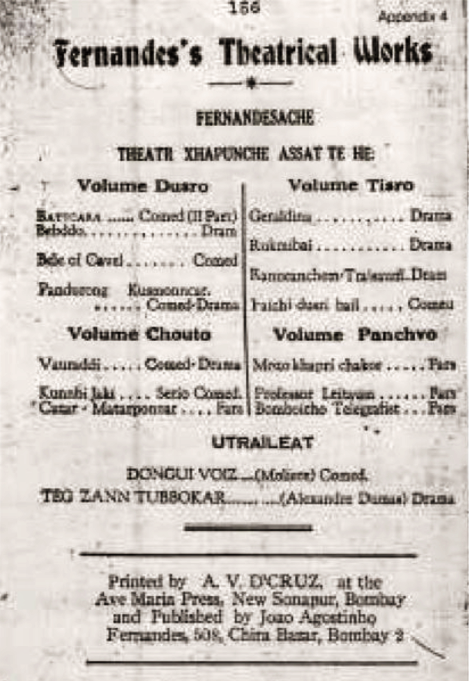
- The play is mentioned in Volume Dusro (Second Volume) of Fernandes's works, c. 1940s
- Written by: João Agostinho Fernandes
- Characters: Albert; Gertrude; Valente; Paul; Pascoal; Rustomji
- Original language: Konkani
- Series: Batcara II; The Belle of Cavel; Pandurang Kusmonncar
- Subject: Outcome of alcoholism on families, and themes of social injustice
- Genre: Tiatr, tragedy
- Setting: Bombay, and a bar

Premiere
- Date premiered: 21 November 1901
- Place premiered: Gaiety Theatre, Bombay, British India

Bebdo (English: The Drunkard) is a two-act Konkani play written by the Goan playwright João Agostinho Fernandes. It was first penned in 1898 and subsequently amended by the author on 29 August 1901. The revision resulted in it being the only known work by Fernandes where the original composition date was altered. The initial script continued to be utilized for theatrical productions until at least the year 1925. The play predominantly explores the challenges faced by Goan families where the primary breadwinner is often in a state of chronic alcoholism, leading to poverty and homelessness for these families during the early 20th century.

== Characters ==
=== Original characters ===
Albert Gonsalves is a drunkard who is addicted to gambling and is the male protagonist.

Gertrude is the wife of Albert and the female protagonist.

Valente Gonsalves is the young son of Albert and Gertrude.

Paul is an acquaintance and drinking partner of Albert.

Pascoal is the gambling partner and friend of Albert.

Rustomji is the barman where Albert and his friends hang out.

=== Revised and new characters after 1925 ===
President of the Piedade Society, an asilo (asylum) for the aged and helpless.

Secretary of the Piedade Society.

Nadkarni serves as a judge.

Godinho is the advocate.

Mahomed Cassim was changed to Mirza Ali, who is the bailiff.

== Synopsis ==
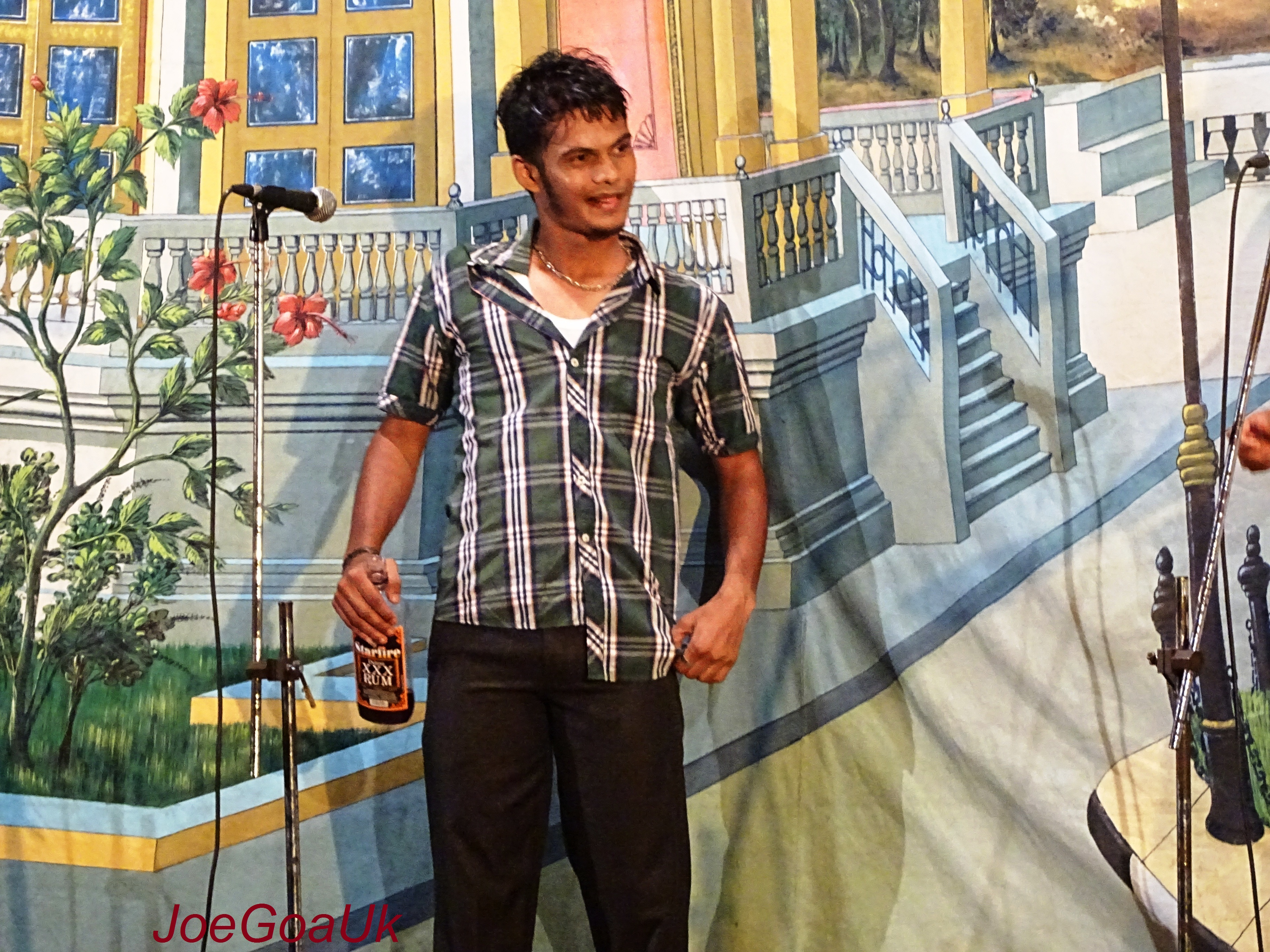
A Goan drunkard played by Frazer Fernandes in a tiatr production, 2015

The play focuses on the life of Albert Gonsalves, a character who struggles with alcoholism and gambling addiction. Despite being aware of the values and behaviors that would be beneficial for himself and his family, he is unable to overcome his vices. The play depicts Albert' repeated attempts to deceive his loved ones in order to spend time with his companions who share his addictions to gambling and alcohol. While aware of the beneficial choices for himself and his family, he prioritizes his internal conflicts over their well-being, ultimately leading to a sorrowful conclusion for both him and his loved ones.

The play portrays a conflict of perspectives among the characters regarding the treatment of Albert. One of the acquaintances of Gonsalves, known as Paul, experiences discomfort due to the proposition put forth by another character named Pascoal. Pascoal suggests the intentional intoxication of Gonsalves to exploit him financially, causing Paul to feel uneasy about the plan. However, the other gamblers present believe that in the context of gambling, there can be no room for compassion. Even Rustomji, the bartender, is aware of the harm and anguish that can result from alcohol addiction. Despite this understanding, his business interests take priority over ethical considerations or concern for others. The narrative indicates his disapproval towards Christians facing challenges with alcoholism and gambling, perceiving these addictions as sources of distress for their families.

Albert is illustrated as exhibiting an excessive level of self-esteem, hubris and a misconception about the nature of his social relationships. He holds the belief that his acquaintances hold him in high regard, and he perceives his wife Gertrude's respect as stemming mainly from her connection to him. Albert associates the respect he garners with his proficiency in serving alcoholic beverages, attributing the amicability he experiences to his role as a provider of liquor. Furthermore, he emphasizes that his occupation provides him with a substantial income surpassing that of many individuals in professions requiring advanced education. In contrast, Gertrude is portrayed as promptly discerning the fallacious nature of Albert's convictions about the nature of their social circles and his standing within them. In a foreshadowing manner, Gertrude anticipates a future scenario where their friends may depart if the availability of liquor diminishes, hinting at potential abandonment and suggesting a more transactional nature to these relationships. Gertrude's keen intuition is evidenced by her premonition that the news Gabriel intends to share with Albert may carry negative implications, as indicated by the hushed and secretive manner in which it is conveyed.

In addition to her perceptions regarding the nature of Albert's social relationships, Gertrude demonstrates foresight regarding the potential adversities that could affect the family of a breadwinner struggling with alcoholism. She envisions a scenario where continued unchecked drinking by Albert could lead to starvation and dire circumstances for his wife and children. Despite this bleak outlook, Gertrude is characterized by her unwavering and forgiving affection and dedication towards Albert, regardless of his well-known mistreatment towards her. The narrative further illustrates the tragic consequences of Albert's alcoholism when his young son, Valente, dies. Even in the presence of his deceased, presumably malnourished child, Albert is shown to continuously beg for a solitary drop of liquor, underscoring the powerful grip of his addiction and the devastating impact it has on his family.

== Title ==
Fernandes has chosen to maintain the original title Bebdo without alterations. However, in English promotional materials, an additional title, The Drunkard, was incorporated. Despite this, within the printed summary of the play, the main character known as 'Albert Gonsalves' is prominently featured as the individual identified as the drunkard.

== Legacy ==
In the 1943 staging of the play, it took place in Portuguese Goa and was organized as a charity event to support the society for the protection of women and the anti-alcoholic campaign. The production showcased an ensemble of popular Konkani artists, such as the Goan singer Minguel Rod, along with a diverse cast of performers. The performance was held in Mapuçá on 2 May with the purpose of fundraising for Oxel church. The play received positive feedback from the audience throughout its successful run. Prior to the 1943 staging, Bebdo had been restaged as early as 1907 in Bombay, predating the prohibition era in India under then-Prime Minister of India Morarji Desai. Fernandes reportedly received feedback that the play had led some audience members who struggled with alcoholism to quit drinking after seeing the production.

On the 25 January 1957, a memorial ceremony was conducted to pay tribute to Fernandes. On this occasion, Bebdo was restaged under the direction of Fernandes's disciple, A. R. Souza Ferrão. This revival performance took place at the Princess Theatre, Bhangwadi in Bombay as a benefit for the Goan Social Welfare League. It was during this 1957 event that the playwright J. P. Souzalin bestowed Fernandes with the honorary title of "Pai Tiatrist" (Father Tiatrist). Ram Ganesh Gadkari's Marathi play Ekach Pyala is thought to have been influenced by Bebdo.
