= José Rodrigues (disambiguation) =

José Rodrigues (1828–1887) was a Portuguese Romantic painter.

José Rodrigues may also refer to:

- José Carlos Rodrigues (1844–1922), Brazilian journalist, financial expert, and philanthropist
- José Francisco Rodrigues, real name of Jose Rod de Parra (1938–2014), Indian comedian, actor, singer, and playwright
- José Ricardo Rodrigues (born 1974), Brazilian boxer
- José Rodrigues Miguéis (1901–1980), Portuguese translator and writer
- José Rodrigues Neto (born 1949), Brazilian football player
- José Rodrigues dos Santos (born 1964), Portuguese writer, lecturer, and journalist
- José Manuel Rodrigues (photographer) (born 1951), Portuguese-Dutch photographer and visual artist
- José Manuel Rodrigues (politician)
