= Regina Fernandes =

Goan theatre actress (1880–1908)

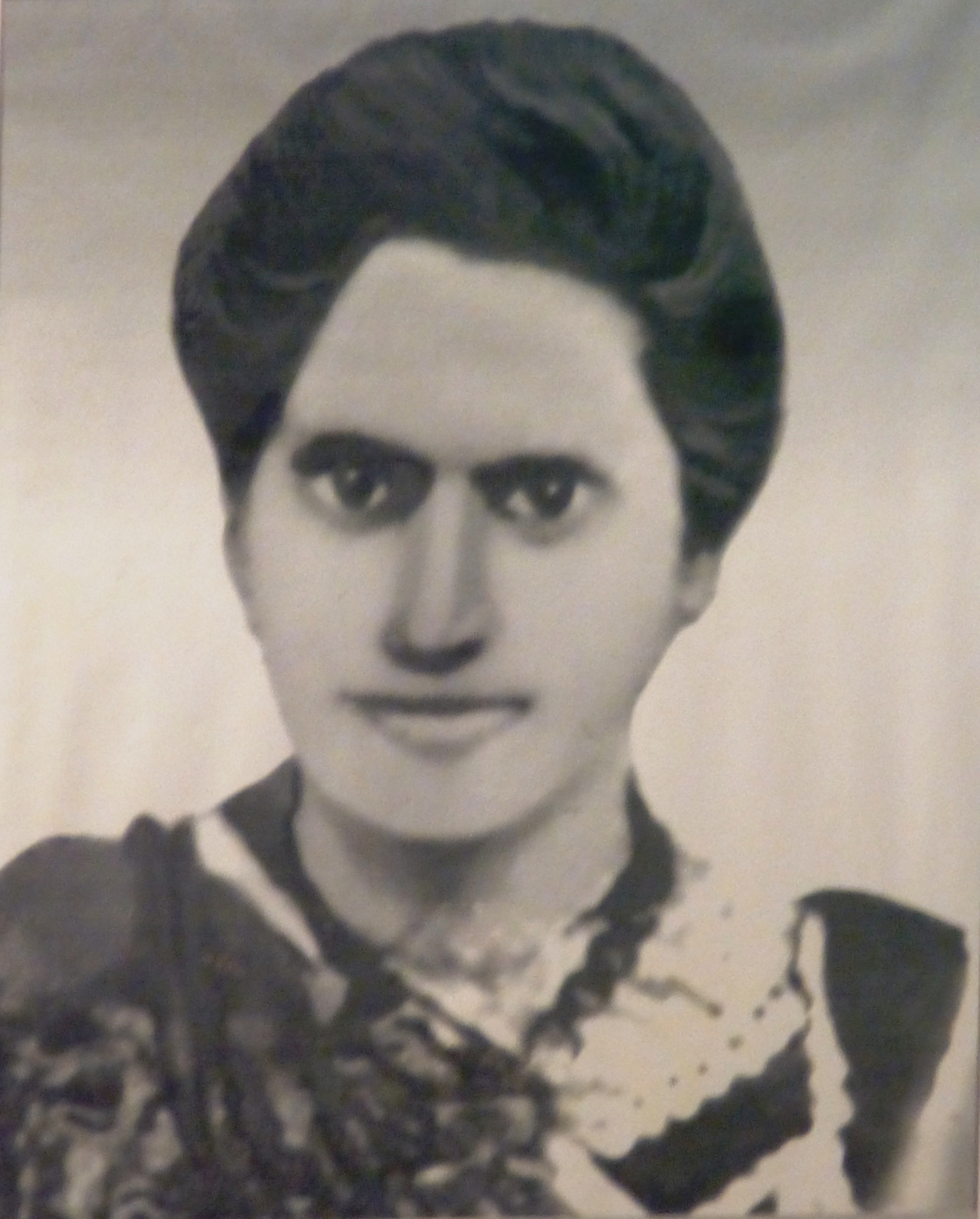
- Fernandes in an undated photo released by Tiatr Academy of Goa
- Born: 16 November 1880; Raia, Goa, Portuguese India
- Died: 20 December 1908 (aged 28); Bombay, British India
- Occupation: Actress
- Years active: 1904–1908
- Known for: First lady of the Konkani stage
- Notable work: Batcara (1904)
- Spouse: Pai Tiatrist (m. 1892)
- Children: 4

Regina Fernandes (16 November 1880 – 20 December 1908) was a Goan theatre actress known as the first lady of the Konkani stage. The wife of playwright João Agostinho Fernandes, she first took to the stage at the age of 24 in her husband's theatro Batcara (The Landlord), which was staged at Gaiety Theatre in Bombay on 22 November 1904.

== Theatrical career ==
Before the year 1904, it was not uncommon for male actors to take on female roles on the theatrical stage. These performers would meticulously transform themselves into women, employing elaborate costumes, makeup, and vocal techniques to convincingly portray female characters. In some instances, these portrayals were so flawless that audience members were unable to discern the actors' true gender. However, on 22 November 1904, a significant shift occurred when playwright Pai Tiatrist, described as a forward-thinking individual with a broad vision and deep respect for women's capabilities, introduced his young wife Fernandes to the stage. Even the Marathi theatre had yet to showcase female actresses at that time. Wilson Mazarello, a Konkani historian and singer, described Pai Tiatrist's decision as a courageous step, as it challenged the prevailing societal norms in Goa, where families generally disapproved of their sons' involvement in tiatrs, or theatrical performances.

=== Debut on the Konkani stage ===
Fernandes made her debut at the age of 24 in the theatro called Batcara (The Landlord), assuming the female role of Roza Maria Luiza Vaz, the wife of Batcara de Panzari. Her performance in this production captured the audience's attention, offering them a unique and immersive experience that had not been witnessed since the inception of Konkani tiatr in 1892. Fernandes's presence on stage brought a heightened sense of realism and added an element of glamour to the performances. Her historic achievement as the first female presence in tiatr paved the way for future generations, serving as an inspiring example for aspiring actresses. Fernandes was only able to pursue her acting career due to her marriage to Pai Tiatrist, who wrote and directed the theatro Batcara.

Konkani theatre holds a significant place in the history of Indian theatre, particularly due to its early inclusion of female performers on stage. This development occurred approximately twenty-seven years before actresses were seen in Marathi, Gujarati, and Bengali plays. A milestone in the Konkani theatre occurred on 22 November 1904, at the Gaiety Theatre in Bombay (Bori Bunder), during the inaugural performance of the Goan Union Dramatic Club. It was on this occasion that Fernandes became the first actress to grace the Konkani stage, delivering a performance in the play Batcara (The Landlord). This event was not only a source of pride for Goan women but also a significant turning point in the history of Goan tiatr, the Konkani theatre tradition. Fernandes' sister, Carmelina Fernandes, also made her debut on the same tiatr stage, further enriching the theatrical landscape. Mazarello has highlighted the nature of this achievement, as the idea of women acting in Konkani theatre was previously unfathomable.

=== Role in Dom Carlos Dramatic Unity ===
Pai Tiatrist played a crucial role in shaping its modernization. His introduction of his wife Fernandes to the tiatr stage brought a fresh perspective and elevated the quality of Konkani performances compared to other theatrical productions of the time. Moreover, Pai Tiatrist's passion for tiatr inspired Luiza Maria Colaco, his second wife, to join the theatre as well. Pai Tiatrist's daughters also became involved in tiatr. Fernandes, along with her husband Pai Tiatrist and their original group members including Policarpo Mendonca, N.M. Fernandes, Anton Abranv, and Lucacinho Ribeiro, played a pivotal role in establishing a strong foundation for the staging of numerous tiatrs. Their contributions were instrumental in the formation of the Dom Carlos Dramatic Unity, a Drama Company that ensured the continuation of their work. While Mazarello has acknowledged the contributions of Lucasinho Ribeiro and Pai Tiatrist, he also recognizes the significant roles played by Policarpo Mendonca, N. M. Fernandes, Anton Abrany, and Fernandes in shaping the Konkani theatre landscape.

== Personal life ==
Regina Fernandes was born on 16 November 1880, in the village of Raia, Goa which was part of Portuguese India during the era of the Portuguese Empire (now situated in India). She had a sibling named Carmelina, who pursued a career as a theater actress, much like Fernandes herself. At the age of 12, Fernandes entered into matrimony with João Agostinho Fernandes, a playwright, who was 20 years old at the time. The wedding ceremony took place on 22 August 1892, at St. Francis Xavier Church in Dabul, Bombay.

On 20 December 1908, Fernandes died in Bombay. She had been unwell for a period of twelve days before her demise. Left behind were her two sons, Michael and Manuel, as well as her two daughters, Sophia and Annie.

== Legacy ==
Fernandes had a brief but influential career in the tiatr stage, lasting only four years. However, her impact on aspiring actresses, particularly young girls, was significant. Despite the potential social repercussions, her involvement in tiatr inspired numerous women artists to join the Konkani stage. Figures such as Ermelinda, Carlota, Mohana, and Cecilia followed in Fernandes' footsteps.

In 2009, the establishment of the Tiatr Academy of Goa (TAG) marked an important milestone for the tiatr community. As part of this development, Fernandes' birth anniversary on 16 November became an annual celebration. The occasion features a special program exclusively performed by women artists from the tiatr stage. The substantial participation in this event served as a tribute to Fernandes and her contributions to the tiatr tradition.

== Plays ==
Year	Title	Role	Notes	Ref
1904	Batcara	Roza Maria Luiza Vaz	Professional debut	
