= Vauraddi =

1934 Konkani play by Pai Tiatrist

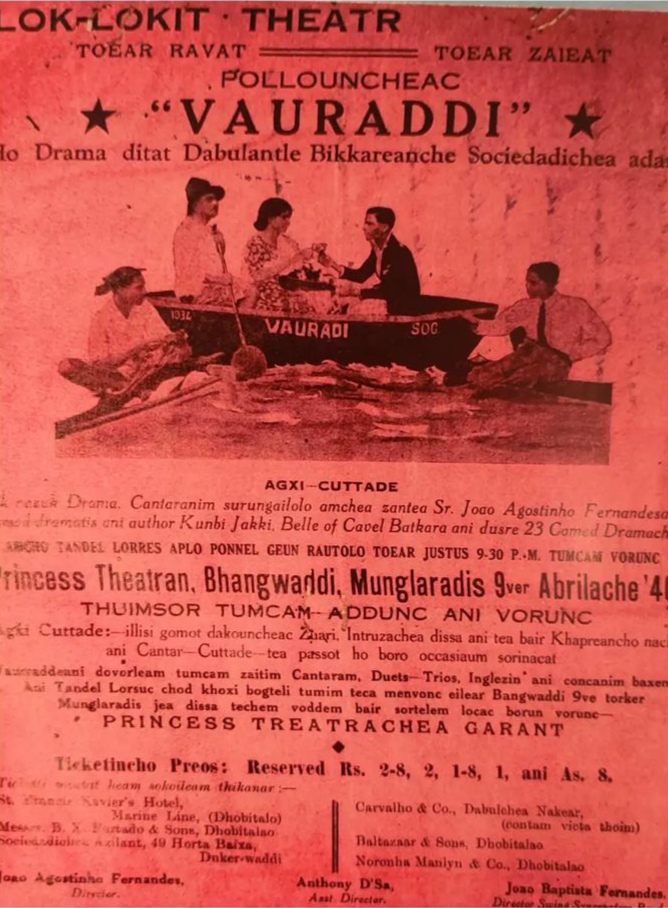
- Handbill from the second staging of the play at Princess Theatre in Bhangwadi, Bombay, 1940
- Original language: Konkani
- Written by: João Agostinho Fernandes
- Characters: Leopold; Carolina; Anjela; Fillip; Lorres; Damião; Doctor Minguel
- Series: Kunbi Jakki; Cazar Matarponnar
- Subject: Dignity of labour
- Genre: Tiatr, melodrama
- Setting: Ancestral mansion, a hut, and canoe in Goa

Premiere
- Date: 14 January 1934
- Place: Sunshine Building, Margão, Goa
- Directed by: João Agostinho Fernandes

Vauraddi (transl. The Labourer) is a three-act Konkani play. It was written and directed by João Agostinho Fernandes. The play was first penned on 13 March 1933 and premiered on 14 January 1934 at the Sunshine Building in Margão, during the Portuguese colonial era in Goa. The play is set in Portuguese Goa and explores the themes of the recognition of the value of work is upheld by individuals from all socioeconomic backgrounds, including both the affluent and the less privileged, as well as the romantic relationship between Leopold, a wealthy Catholic man, and Carolina, a poor rural woman. The melodrama, underwent two revisions before being staged three times in total. The earnings from these performances were dedicated to charitable causes.

== Characters ==
Leopold is a wealthy young man who owns land and subscribes to the principle of self-sufficiency through personal labor rather than relying on the output of others' work. He falls in love with Carolina, his future wife. He is the male protagonist.

Carolina is a poor rural, illiterate girl from a laborer background. She is known for her devotion to God, likable character, and admirable virtues. She is the future wife of Leopold and the female protagonist.

Anjela is Leopold's proud, rich mother who is a landlady and comes from an affluent social class. She is against her son's marriage to Carolina and demonstrates animosity towards individuals of lower socioeconomic status, exhibiting an arrogant demeanor.

Fillip is Carolina's father, a laborer by profession. He is protective and caring towards his daughter.

Lorres is a boatman who enables young couples to express their love for each other in a romantic setting while acting as a witness to their commitment. He comes from a toddy tapper background.

Damião is a Goan landlord from Neura, Goa, who arrives to request the assistance of Fillip. He is a minor character.

Doctor Minguel takes up the case of Anjela's contagious disease. He is a minor character.

Mari Anjel is Lorres's wife, and she is one of the two off-stage voices.

Santan is Lorres's assistant in his business and the second of the two off-stage voices.

== Plot summary ==
Leopold, a landowner, values self-sufficiency and the dignity of labor. He is of the opinion that all types of work are honorable as long as they serve the purpose of securing one's livelihood. Despite his status as a landowner, Leopold is prepared to engage in physical work or manual tasks, demonstrating his loyalty to the principle of earning one's keep through hard work. In contrast, for Fillip, the laborer, views hard work as a vital component for his existence, surpassing mere preference to become a fundamental necessity for his sustenance. Fillip likely depends on his labor to sustain himself and his family. Despite being aware of Carolina's poor financial status, Leopold falls in love with and pursues her. Carolina embodies a modest lifestyle rooted in rural surroundings, emphasizing a devotion to her spiritual beliefs in a higher deity, she is the daughter of Fillip. Leopold finds Carolina's attributes and moral fiber worthy of his admiration.

Leopold's mother, Anjela, challenges him to choose between staying in the family's ancestral mansion or leaving it to live with his wife, Carolina, in her thatched hut. Despite the social status disparity, Leopold makes the choice to depart from the ancestral mansion and opt to live with his wife, Carolina, demonstrating his commitment to her by rejecting any notion of forsaking her. Leopold challenges his mother's aristocratic views by asserting the principle of human equality as ordained by God, highlighting the role of circumstances and opportunities in shaping one's socioeconomic status. Leopold provides evidence for his assertion by pointing to the success stories of individuals like Henry Ford, Andrew Carnegie, and John D. Rockefeller, who rose to fame and fortune from common origins, as well as the trajectories of figures such as Salazar, Mussolini, Hitler, and Chamberlain, who attained positions of power and influence despite their modest beginnings. He presents a strong argument against the notion that class disparities should serve as a hindrance to marital unions, emphasizing a more egalitarian perspective on relationships. He believes that social status should not be a barrier to personal relationships and that all people deserve to be treated with equal dignity, regardless of their socioeconomic background.

Fillip, the father of Carolina, is shown to be protective and worried about his daughter. Upon an unanticipated visit from the stranger Leopold, Fillip responds with hostility. His demeanor shifts when he learns of Leopold's desire to wed Carolina, as he contemplates the possibility of Carolina enduring hardship if she marries into Leopold's family due to perceived mistreatment by Anjela. She has ambitions to elevate her family's financial status by securing a generous dowry from her son's prospective bride. She is depicted as disapproving of Leopold's decisions and perceives him as callous for refusing her suggestions concerning his marriage. Anjela's arrogance and disdain for those she deems beneath her social status are evident when she belittles laborers and admonishes Leopold for mingling with them. She takes drastic measures by attempting to evict both Leopold and Carolina, and even goes as far as threatening to force Fillip out of his home, leaving the couple without a place to live.

Dr. Minguel suggests that assistance during hardships often comes from the economically disadvantaged. Carolina, despite facing criticism from Anjela, takes care of her mother-in-law during an contagious disease, aiding in her recovery. Despite Carolina's efforts, Anjela remains cold towards her daughter-in-law, while Anjela's own relatives keep their distance during her illness. Lorres, a genial boatman, facilitates the romantic encounter between Leopold and Carolina as they express their commitment in his presence. In the beginning, Lorres exhibits a cold attitude towards Leopold's endeavors to court Carolina, under the impression that Leopold is simply one of many affluent suitors seeking to charm a less privileged woman. Upon realizing the authenticity of Leopold's intentions, Lorres' helpful nature prompts him to support the young couple in uniting. As the play draws to a close, Lorres has come into possession of a patmar, a sailing boat, and possesses the means to extend financial assistance to Leopold. The play concludes with Carolina's apparent death, which is attributed to contracting the contagious illness from her mother-in-law Anjela.

== Staging ==
Vauraddi was first staged on 14 January 1934 at the Sunshine Building in Margão, Goa. The performance was staged with the support of the Socios da Sociedade dos Operarios (Members of the Workers Society). During this initial staging, the playwright Fernandes utilized the term "theatro" in the advertising for the play, which helped to popularize the word among the local population. The play was subsequently staged again on 9 April 1940 at the Princess Theatre in Bhangwadi, Bombay. This second performance was organized to support the Society of Nossa Senhora de Piedade in Dabul, with the objective of collecting funds to aid the local indigent population. For this later staging, Fernandes had made a change in the advertising by using the term "Theatr" instead of "theatro". Scholar Olivinho Gomes has provided an analysis of Vauraddi as a play with reformist themes centered on advocating for the dignity of labor and advocating for social progress through labor law reforms.

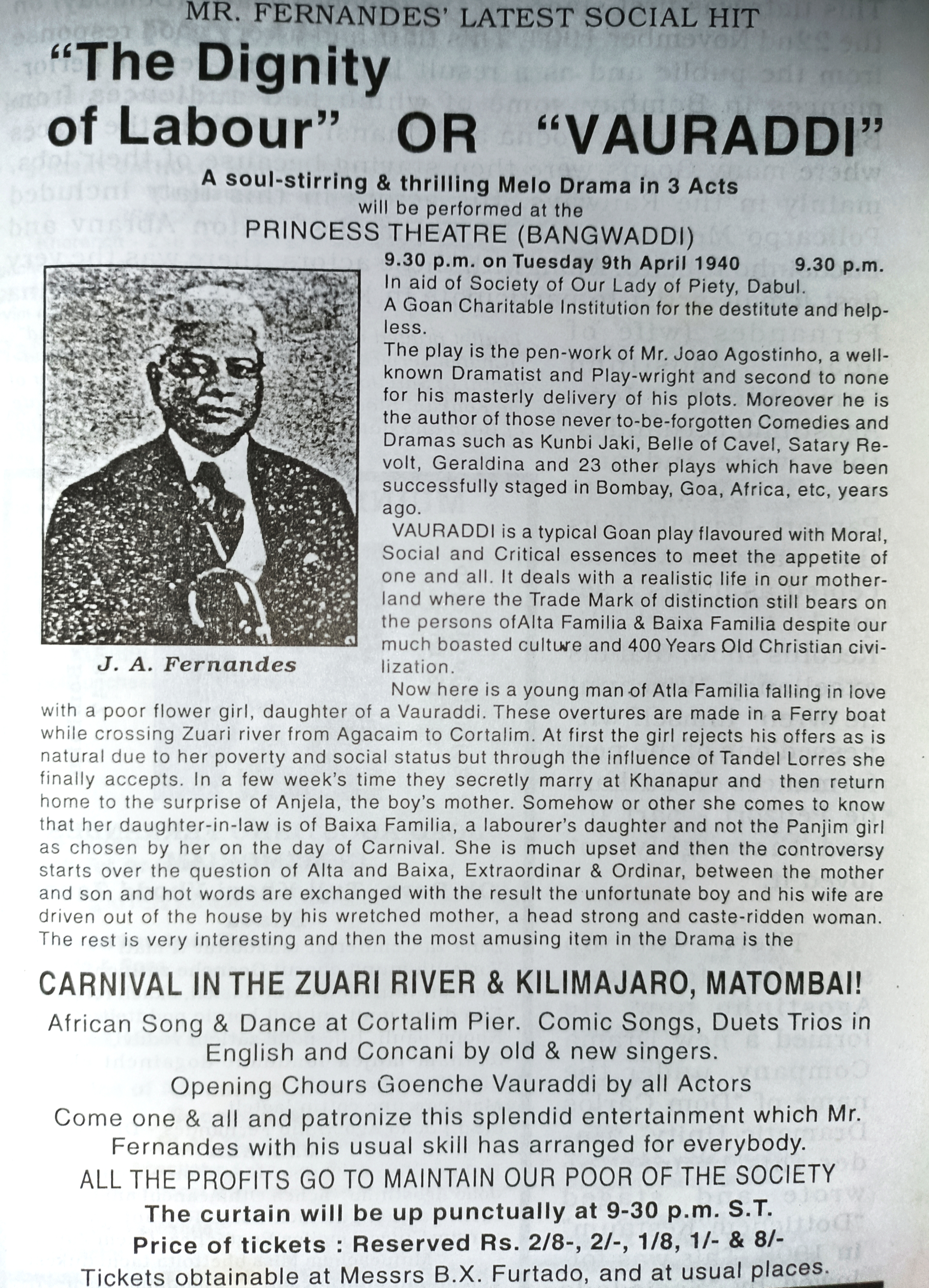
An English handbill of the second staging of the play in Bombay, 1940

In 1941, a severe cyclone struck the Goa region, causing extensive damage to several coastal areas, including Arossim, Cansaulim, Majorda, Colva, Betalbatim, and Carmona. In response to the devastation, the Goa Flood Relief Fund Committee organized a fundraising event by staging a performance of the play Vauraddi on 16 February 1941, at the St. Xavier's College Hall in Bombay. The goal of this event was to collect donations to provide aid and assistance to the homeless and impoverished individuals affected by the cyclone. This particular staging of Vauraddi marked the third and final documented production of the play. In the 1940 version, the Konkani comedian Anthony Mendes was cast in his first main role, playing the character of Lorres, the boatman. This performance helped Mendes gain initial recognition and fame at the start of his acting career. Additionally, Fernandes's son, Tony, another Konkani actor, also participated in one of the productions of Vauraddi.
