= The Belle of Cavel =

1895 Konkani play by Pai Tiatrist

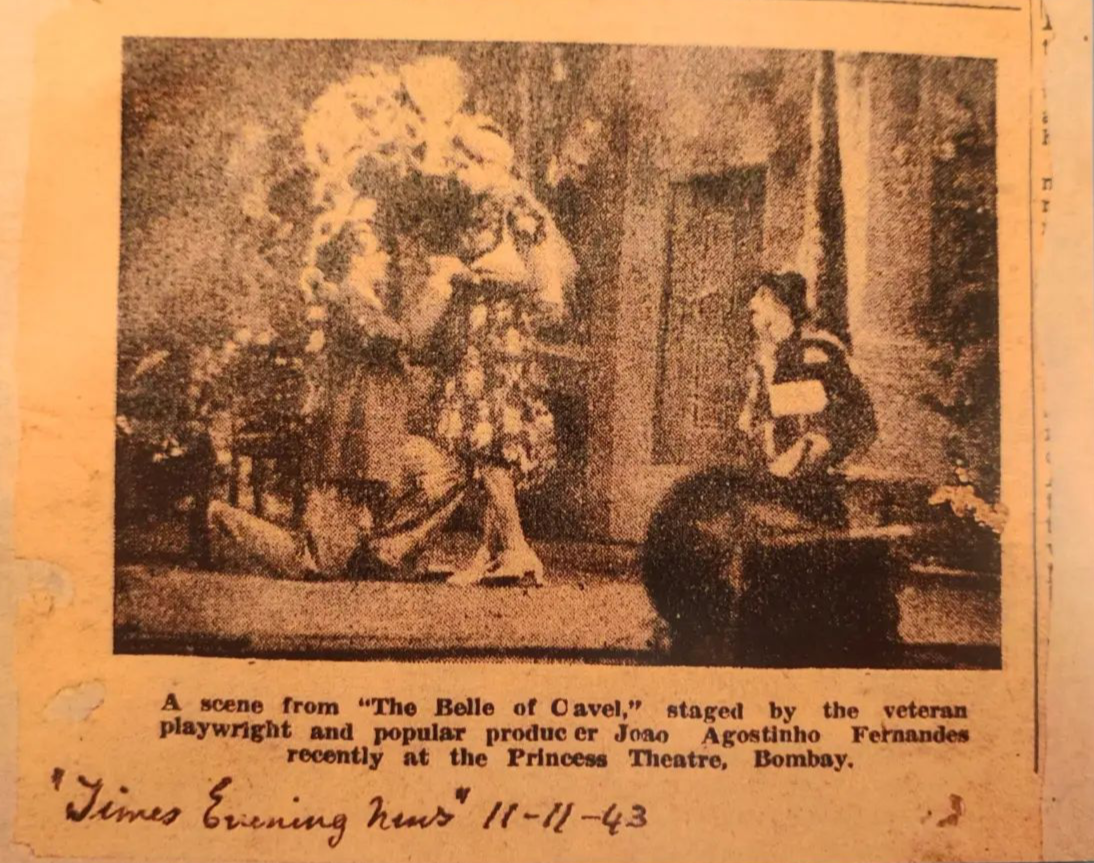
- A photograph of the play featured in the Times Evening News, 1943
- Original language: Konkani
- Written by: João Agostinho Fernandes
- Characters: Deodita; Amaral; Hellen; Berthold; Gregory; João; Esperans; Silvester; Marcelin; Alex
- Series: Batcara II; Bebdo; Pandurang Kusmonncar
- Subject: Preference for love marriage versus arranged marriage, challenges with caste and class differences
- Genre: Tiatr, romcom
- Setting: Charni Road Gardens

Premiere
- Date: May 1895
- Place: Skating Rink, Bombay
- Directed by: João Agostinho Fernandes

The Belle of Cavel is a two-act Konkani play written and directed by the Goan playwright João Agostinho Fernandes in his debut as a playwright. It is a musical comedy that explores themes of romantic comedy. It was first composed in 1893 and later debuted on stage in 1895. Between the years 1909 and 1943, this theatrical work had no less than ten more showings, solidifying its place as one of Fernandes's most acclaimed productions. The play was known by different titles such as Charni Road Bagh and Eoc Goencar B. A. Exam Passar until 1927 when it was rebranded with its present title in 1932.

== Characters ==
Deodita is the belle of Cavel, an educated young woman and the female protagonist.

Amaral, a law student, is the Belle's love interest and the male protagonist.

Hellen is depicted as the traditional-minded companion of the Belle.

Gregory is the Belle's elderly father who opposes his daughter's decision to marry her lover.

Professor Dom Berthold Mustard is the mad professor known for his witty remarks and disputes. He later marries Esperans.

Bhojjawalla is the man who argues with Berthold.

João is a passerby and an acquaintance of Amaral.

Esperans is the village woman who appears in the subplot and is part of a love triangle.

Silvester is a sailor who wants to marry Esperans and appears in the subplot.

Marcelin is the love interest of Esperans and appears in the subplot.

Alex is the father of Amaral, who later has a fight with Gregory.

Baltazar is the lawyer who defends Amaral during his trial.

Gunderiwalla is the second witness during Amaral's trial.

== Plot ==
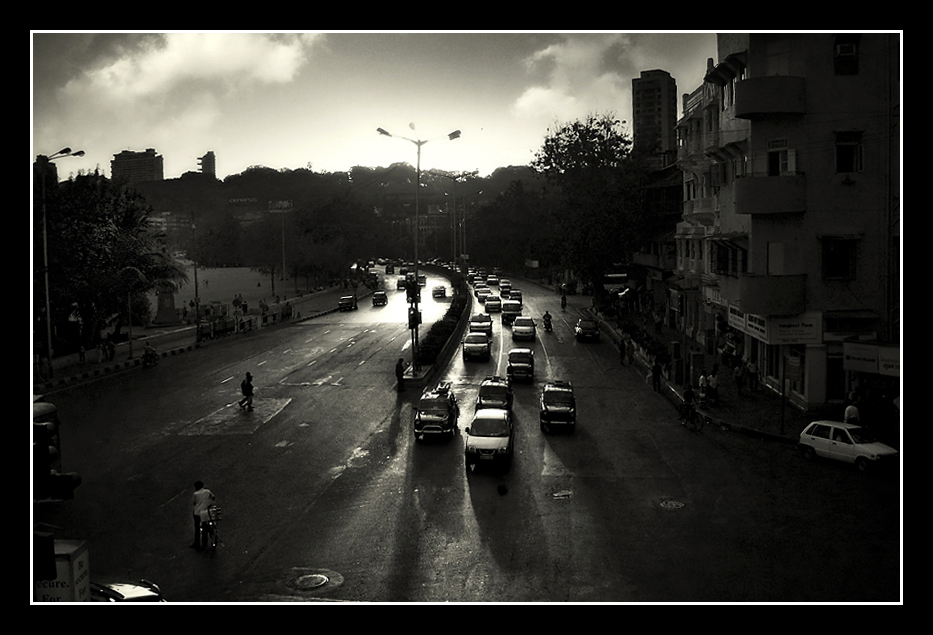
The neighborhood of Charni Road in 2009, where the original play is set.

=== Act I ===
Amaral, a Bachelor of Arts (B.A.) graduate, is focused on his Bachelor of Laws (L.L.B.) exam preparations when he encounters João. Their discussions range from politics to current affairs. Meanwhile, Deodita, renowned as the Belle of Cavel, is strolling with her companion Hellen in the distance. Amaral and Deodita share a moment of mutual attraction, leading to the blossoming of love at first sight. The storyline involves Berthold's conflict with Bhojjawalla, along with other events. Amaral is the recipient of a correspondence from the Belle. Their interaction is characterized by intense emotions and romantic discussions. João and Hellen are influenced by their romantic gestures. Amaral signals his desire to wed the Belle by presenting an engagement ring as a symbol of their betrothal. Concurrently, Esperans rejects romantic overtures from Silvester. Berthold contributes witty and insightful remarks to the unfolding events.

Amaral engages Berthold to act as an intermediary for delivering a message of affection to the Belle. Inquisitive about the content of the letter, the Belle's father, Gregory, disguises himself as her grandfather and promises to pass the letter to Deodita upon her return. The peculiar professor entrusts Berthold with the letter and is compensated. After discovering the letter's contents, the furious old man expels the Belle from the residence due to her defiance and disrespect. Berthold feigns sympathy towards Gregory in a mocking manner. Deodita and Amaral convene in the garden, during which Amaral voices his apprehensions regarding the upcoming L.L.B. examination. Deodita offers words of encouragement and support to Amaral during this challenging time. Meanwhile, Marcelin has a rendezvous with Esperans, and Berthold entertains with his witty jokes.

=== Act II ===
Alex and Gregory, two fathers, engage in a confrontation, resulting in a physical scuffle over the topic of Amaral and Deodita's engagement. The dispute intensifies from verbal disagreements to a physical altercation. Berthold adds his witty remarks to the situation, injecting humor into the tense encounter. Marcelin finds himself in Silvester's control, with both vying for Esperans's hand in marriage. Berthold intervenes, resolving their conflict by brandishing a revolver. He successfully resolves the situation, leading Esperans away in triumph.

Amaral's apprehension regarding abduction charges is alleviated by the Belle assuming complete responsibility. Their exchange is interrupted by Gregory's arrival with law enforcement to arrest Amaral, and they are then escorted to the police station. In the legal proceedings involving Amaral accused of abducting the Belle of Cavel, the police inspector puts forth a forceful argument. Baltazar provides a competent defense. Berthold's courtroom jests and testimony are notable, with Gunderiwalla appearing as the second witness. The Judge's final remarks contribute to Amaral's ultimate exoneration.

== Themes ==
The play examines the growth of enduring friendships among educated young individuals, disregarding the approval of parents or societal barriers. This theme is subtly introduced in the initial choral passage, as the main characters Deodita and Amaral sing: "Zaite zananim utor dilam angasori Pai maiche khoxi bhairi" (transl. Many have given their word here, against the wishes of their parents). The play emphasizes the concept of empowering women, with a particular focus on the role of education in this empowerment. The production also emphasizes the importance of responsible conduct among educated women, cautioning against frivolity. The play portrays the persistent conflict between traditional values and modern influences, showcasing a setting where educated young women are becoming more confident in making independent choices regarding their lives, including their decisions on marriage partners.

The work also explores the conflict between traditional societal expectations and emerging trends emphasizing personal autonomy in matters of marriage. Traditionalist perspectives maintained that factors like caste and class should be key criteria in such decisions, a view challenged by the playwright Fernandes as incompatible with Christian principles. This thematic tension is conveyed through the male protagonist Amaral, who expresses concern over the persistence of caste distinctions among Christians, questioning how such practices align with their religious faith. The play directly depicts the consequences of these divergent attitudes, as the parents of Amaral and Deudita clash over appropriate marriage considerations, leading to physical altercations between the fathers. Consequently, the need to overcome entrenched prejudices related to hierarchies of caste and class emerges as a central preoccupation of the work. It grapples with the broader sociocultural shifts underway, where traditional norms governing arranged marriage face increasing challenges from perspectives emphasizing individual choice and religious universalism.

== 2021 adaptation ==
In December 2021, the Tiatr Academy of Goa (TAG) appointed tiatr director and scholar Michael Gracias to produce a play written by Goan playwright João Agostinho Fernandes, marking the 150th anniversary of Fernandes's birth. Gracias selected one of Fernandes's plays and spent two weeks transcribing the original handwritten manuscript in order to produce a more accessible typed version. For the production, Gracias assembled a cast that included some of his own students. Following that, he undertook the task of restructuring and refining the theatrical piece by infusing it with beloved traditional Konkani musical compositions from the early to mid-20th century. These incorporated songs included "Tornnem Rogot", "Bhattacho Vantto", "Zalo Tedna Melo", "Dotik Lagon", "Ankvar Mariechem Dukh", and "Bottatteanchi Bhaji".

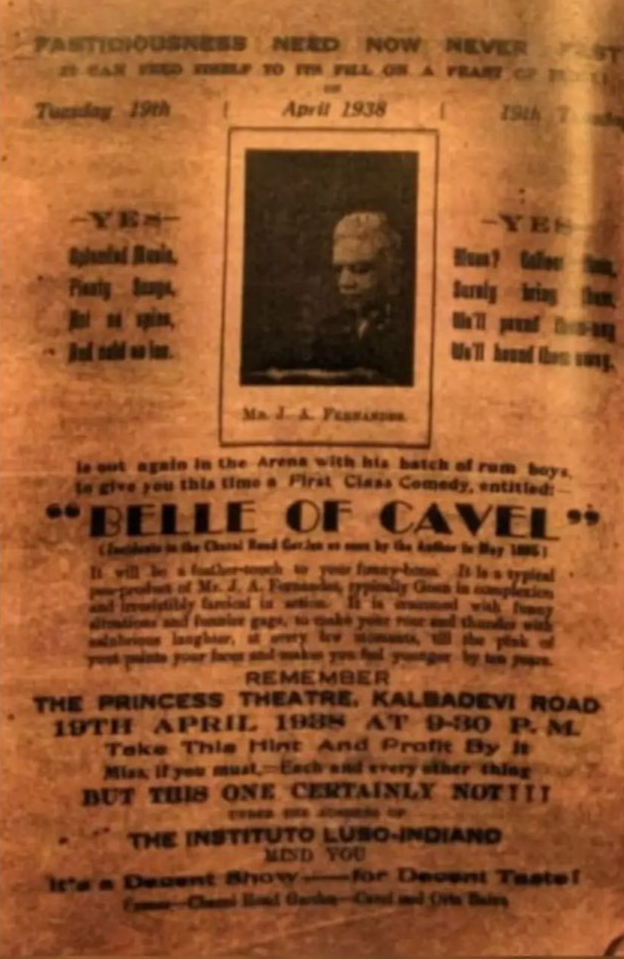
The 1938 staging of the original play at The Princess Theatre, Kalbadevi

Gracias composed the introductory musical piece for the theatrical production as a gesture of reverence towards the artistic contributions of Fernandes. The play underwent an extensive rehearsal period, with the cast and crew meeting daily for three weeks to prepare. The Tiatr Academy of Goa granted financial assistance for the staging of five performances of the three-hour play. By June 2022, the play had been performed 22 times following its premiere. On 2 October 2022, Gracias brought the play to Cavel, Mumbai, which was the original inspiration for the production. Over 250 people attended this performance in Mumbai. Following the Cavel showing, additional performances of the play were held at other venues in the Mumbai area, including Kurla, Dadar, Matunga, and Kankavli.

== Scene by scene ==
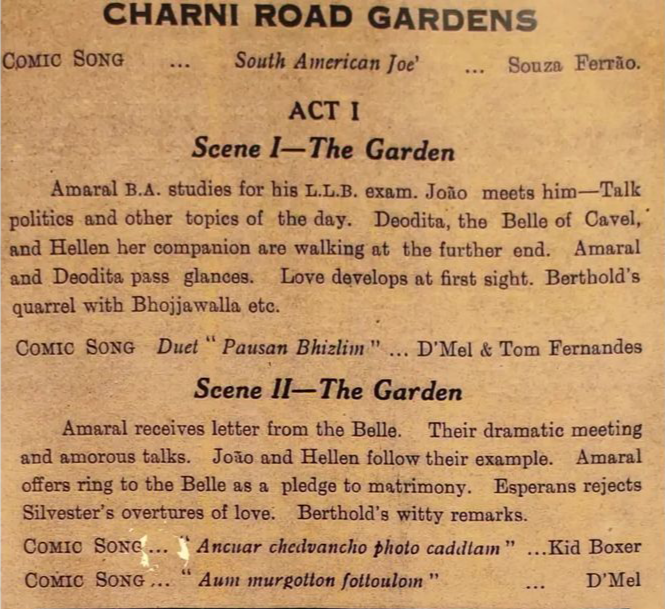
Act I – Scene I & II

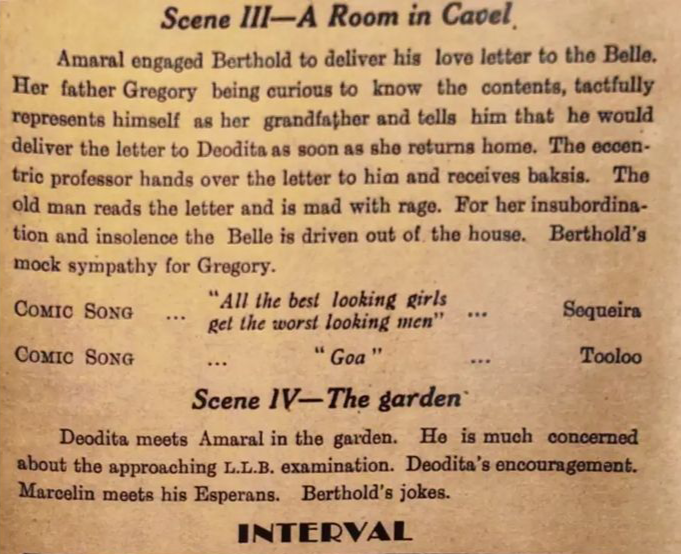
Scene III & IV

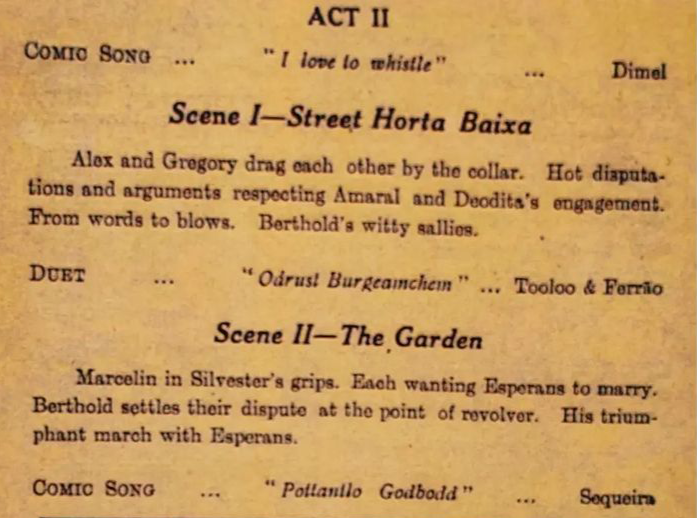
Act II – Scene I & II

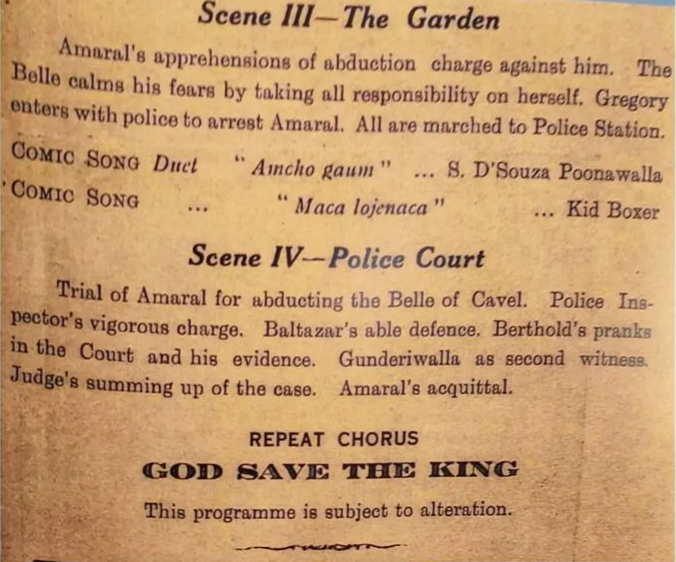
Scene III & IV
