= Jose Rod de Parra =

Indian comedian and actor (1938–2014)

- Rodrigues in 2014
- Born: José Francisco Rodrigues; 1 October 1938; Parra, Goa, Portuguese India, Portuguese Empire (now in India)
- Died: 13 June 2014 (aged 75); Parra, Goa, India
- Occupations: Comedian; actor; singer; playwright
- Years active: c. 1948–2014
- Spouse: Angela Rodrigues
- Children: 5

José Francisco Rodrigues (1 October 1938 – 13 June 2014), known professionally as Jose Rod de Parra, was an Indian comedian, actor, singer, and playwright known for his work in tiatr productions and zagors.

== Early life ==
José Francisco Rodrigues was born on 1 October 1938 in the village of Parra, Goa, which was part of Portuguese India during the Portuguese Empire (now located in India), to Francisco Abrão Rodrigues, a worker, and Ana Angélica Fernandes, a homemaker, in a Goan Catholic family. He was the fourth of four children, having an elder brother, Lourencinho (born 1926), and two elder sisters, Bernardina (born 1931), and Gumeroza (born 1935).

== Career ==
Rodrigues commenced his journey on the tiatr stage at the age of ten, establishing himself as a tiatrist (tiatr performer). His talent and aptitude allowed him to gain popularity, not only in his native village of Parra and the surrounding villages of the Bardez taluka, but also in various other villages throughout the state of Goa. He shared the limelight with commercial tiatrists such as Valente Mascarenhas, Prem Kumar, Jessie Dias, S. B. Radio, Thomas Andrade, and many others. Theater directors, including Valente, Thomas Andrade, Francis de Parra, Bonaventure D'Pietro, and Anthony Furtado, sought Rodrigues' participation in their tiatrs. Some productions in which he featured include Valente' Bim Toxem Bhat, Thomas Andrade's Mog Vo Axea (Love or Greed) and Ekuch Mati (One Sand), Francis de Parra's Lagmodi Sun, Bonaventure D'Pietro's Vatt Chuklelem Suknnem (The Lost Bird), and Anthony Furtado's tiatr. Rodrigues garnered acclaim for his comedic songs and frequently portrayed comic characters in collaboration with fellow comedian Johnny de Saligão.

Rodrigues showcased his talent and versatility as both a tiatr performer and a zagor artiste. His passion for these traditional forms of folk drama, ignited a sense of enthusiasm within him whenever tiatr or zagor were mentioned. On 17 May 2014, Rodrigues made his final appearance in the zagor production titled Sukh Tankam Favo Zaum (May they find happiness), which was written and directed by his son, Domnic de Parra. In this performance, Rodrigues collaborated with his son Braz de Parra and brother-in-law Aniceto, forming a trio that showcased a composition personally crafted by Rodrigues himself. During this significant occasion, Rodrigues received recognition and appreciation, being felicitated alongside John de Parra. Not only did Rodrigues work as a performer, but he also displayed his creative prowess by writing a tiatr called Mogachem Kazar Atanchea Tempar (Love marriage in today's generation). Additionally, he showcased his acting skills in two tiatrs penned by his son Braz de Parra, namely Rostad and Nagovnno (Cheater). Rodrigues's artistic contributions extended beyond the realm of acting and writing. He lent his voice to his son Braz's Konkani audio CD titled Kosli Ixttagot (What is Friendship), which was released on 1 December 2013, in Kuwait. The CD, created by Avy Productions, was introduced during the performance of 'Goencho Rakonddar,' a Konkani musical show organized by Maestro Shahu at the Asia-Asia Hall. It featured 13 tracks performed by Goan singers connected to the Konkani theatrical scene.

== Personal life ==
Rodrigues married Angela "Eliza", a homemaker originally from Anjuna, Goa. The couple had three sons: Isidor, Greg, and Dominic, and two daughters: Carmen and Anita. All three of his sons are involved in the Konkani stage. Isidor is known professionally as Braz de Parra, a singer and composer. Dominic and Greg are also Konkani singers. Rodrigues's brother-in-law, Aniceto, is also a singer active in the Konkani stage. Rodrigues resided at Silva Vaddo in Parra, Goa.

== Death ==
On 17 May 2014, during Rodrigues' final appearance in his son's theatrical production titled Sukh Tankam Favo Zaum, his health deteriorated significantly. Less than a month later, on 13 June 2014, Rodrigues died at his residence in Silva Vaddo, Parra, Goa, at the age of 75. Following his death, a funeral procession was organized, which commenced on 15 June, two days after his demise at 4 pm. The procession proceeded to St. Anne's Church in Parra, where a eucharistic celebration was held, followed by his burial in accordance with Christian customs.
