= Vinayak Maharaj Masurkar =

Indian preacher (1885 – 1955)

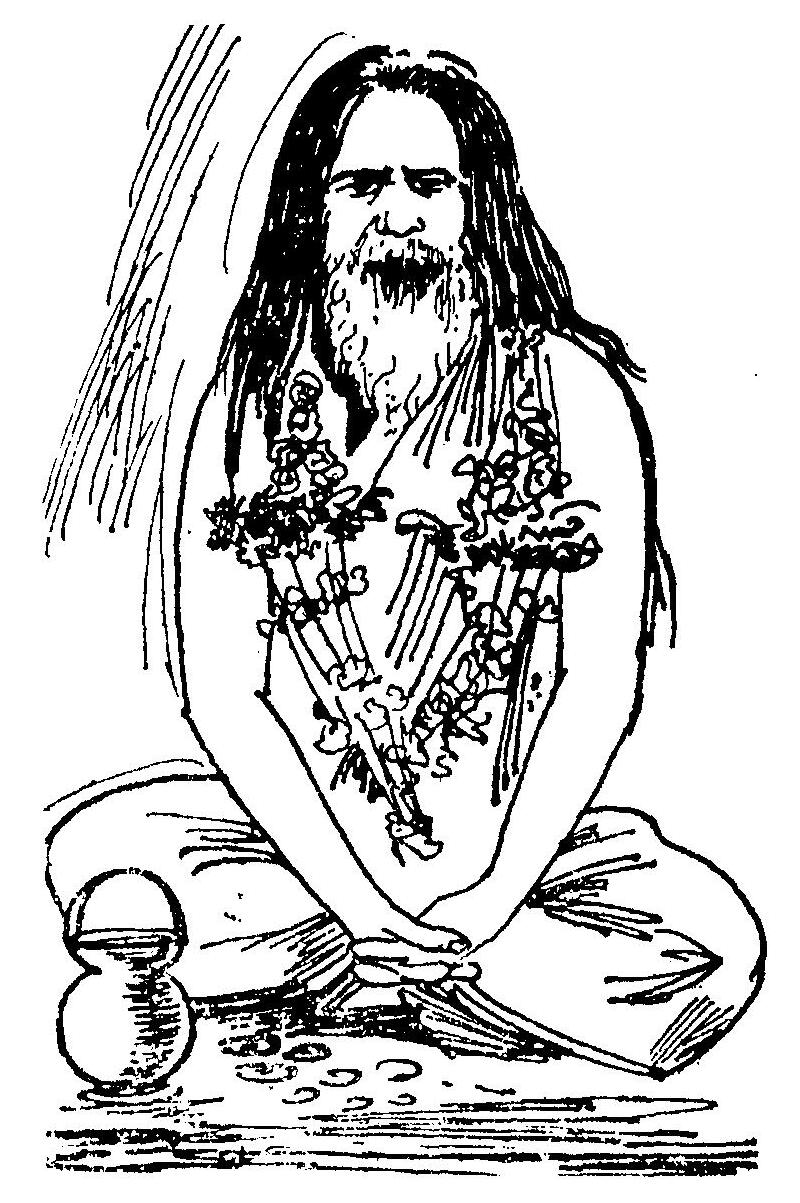
- Born: 1885
- Died: 1955 (aged 69–70)
- Occupations: Social reformer, preacher

Vinayak Maharaj Masurkar (1885 – 1955) was an Indian preacher and social reformer. Inspired by the life of Samarth Ramdas, he committed his life to spiritual practice, public service, and the reformation of Hindu society. He is best known for establishing the Masurashram in 1920 and leading extensive community reconversion (shuddhikaran) initiatives across various parts of India, most notably in Goa.

== Early life ==
Vinayak Maharaj Masurkar was born in 1885 in Masur, located in the Satara region. Emulating the actions of the saint Samarth Ramdas, he fled from his own wedding canopy to pursue a life of spirituality. He spent numerous years performing rigorous penance to attain divine grace, during which time he deeply studied Sanskrit literature and the Dharmashastras.

== Spiritual journey ==
Following his studies, Masurkar undertook a 12-year pilgrimage that spanned from Rameswaram to Kailash-Mansarovar, reaching as far as Kabul and Kandahar. Throughout these extensive travels across India, he closely examined the lifestyles, social status, institutions, castes, and tribes of different regions. This journey led him to dedicate his future endeavors to the advancement and upliftment of Hindu society.

== Masurashram and educational work ==
In 1920, Masurkar established the Masurashram. The primary objective of the institution was to cultivate disciplined, self-sacrificing, scholarly, and service-oriented preachers. Admission to the ashram was granted exclusively to young men who had completed their upanayana (sacred thread ceremony) and demonstrated a profound commitment to serving God, religion, culture, and the nation.

The training at the ashram included spiritual practices such as meditation (dhyan-dharana), pranayama, and yoga. It also included academic coursework covering languages, mathematics, history, and geography.

Masurkar also emphasized physical education and self-defense for youth by setting up gymnasiums (vyayamshalas) across multiple regions. At these centers, young men were trained in traditional physical exercises, yogasanas, and the practical handling of weapons such as daggers (jambiya) and spears.

== Reconversion and social reforms ==
Between 1928 and 1929, Masurkar led a prominent mass reconversion (shuddhikaran) movement in Goa, collectively bringing thousands of Christian Gauda community members, whose ancestors had previously undergone conversion to Christianity, back into Hinduism. This campaign faced significant opposition and harassment from the ruling Portuguese government against Masurkar and his disciples, which ultimately brought widespread recognition to the Masurashram. Following this, he expanded these purification efforts to other regions, including Vasai, Daman, Nagar Haveli, Karnataka, Varhad (Vidarbha), and the Satpura Range. As part of this mandate, he also worked to rescue, purify, and reintegrate women who had been abducted and forcibly converted to other faiths.

Through Masurashram, Masurkar engaged in several other social welfare activities:

- Welfare of marginalized communities: He deployed preachers to assist and resolve the grievances of underprivileged groups, specifically targeting erstwhile untouchables and tribal (Girijan) communities.
- Vedic traditions: To foster unity and sustain Vedic traditions, he organized numerous yajna (sacrificial ritual) ceremonies across various locations.
- Inclusive rituals: He initiated public, mantra-backed, and armed upanayana ceremonies for individuals belonging to the Kshatriya and Vaishya communities.

== Cultural and literary contributions ==
Masurkar utilized literature and public speaking to propagate religious and social education. Believing that the teachings of the text Dasbodh were essential to liberating Indians from subjugation and slavery, he traveled across the country delivering lectures.

To further his educational goals, he printed and distributed several books, including Dasbodh, Manache Shlok, Nityopasana, Shrikrishnacho Sandesh (transl. The Message of Shri Krishna) and Shivajiche Jaysinhak Patra (transl. Shivaji's Letter to Jaysingh).

He also established two regular periodicals: Shridasbodh, a monthly magazine, and Vishwabodh, a weekly publication. Additionally, he distributed artistic depictions of revered Hindu gods like Rama, Krishna, Hanuman, and Samarth Ramdas to the general public.
