= Caste system in Goa =

Hindu and Christian caste system in the Indian state of Goa

The caste system in Goa consists of various Jātis or sub-castes found among Hindus belonging to the four varnas (Brahmin, Kshatriya, Vaishya, and Shudra), as well as those outside of them. A variation of the traditional Hindu caste system was also retained by the Goan Catholic community.

== Hindu caste system ==
According to the Gazetteer of India, Union Territory: Goa, Daman and Diu, Part I, published in 1979 the 'chief castes' found in Goa are:

=== Brahman ===
- Pancha Gauda Brahmins Saraswat Brahmins are spread over widely separated regions spanning from Kashmir and Punjab in the north to the Konkan region of southwest India covering the states of Maharashtra, Karnataka, and Kerala. The word Saraswat is derived from the Rigvedic Sarasvati River.
  - Gaud Saraswat Brahmins popularly known as GSBs. They are landowning though most were engaged in clerical jobs, trade, priests and landlords.
  - Kudaldeshkar Gaud Brahman were landowning class generally associated with agriculture and trade.
  - Chitrapur Saraswat Brahmin were associated with trade.
  - Rajapur Saraswat Brahmin also known as Bhalavalikar Saraswat Brahmins.
- Pancha Dravida Brahmins
  - The two sub-castes was known as the Padye Brahmins and Bhatt Prabhus, popularly known as 'Bhatt' and 'Prabhu' respectively. They generally associate themselves with Karhade Brahmins. They are landowning castes and were engaged as temples priests and in agriculture, some into money lending.
  - Chitpavan Brahmins also known as Konkanastha Brahman are priests, few in area like Sattari are landowners and work in other professions.
  - Kramavanta Joshi or Kriyavant Joshi, they were a class of priests who officiated Hindu funeral ceremony and were looked down upon by the above-mentioned castes.

=== 96 Kuli Maratha ===
Kshatriyas of Goa historically belonged to different clans, and they were collectively referred to as Chardo prior to the Portuguese rule in Goa.

Historian and Journalist B.D. Satoskar has cited Shenoi Goembab Konkani Author and Grammerian had said that "The Konkani word Chardo comes from the Sanskrit word Chatur-Rathi & the Prakrit word Chau-radi literally means The one who rides a chariot yoked with four horses, like Maha-Rathi for the origin of the word 'Maratha'.Chatur-rathi have entered Goa through Dwaraka & Cheddis."

The term Chardo fell into disuse among the Hindu Kshatriyas, in order to differentiate from those Kshatriyas who converted to Catholic Christianity. Later, the Hindus Kshatriyas began to identify themselves as Marathas of the Mahratta confederacy of the Deccan.

=== Vaishya Vani ===
Vaishya/Vaishya Vani: are the traditional community of traders, and are commonly known as Vanis.

=== Daivadnya ===
Daivadnya Brahmins are popularly known as Shetts, they mainly work as jewellers.They are Mahajan of Kasarpali Kalika devi Temple in Bicholim . They're Forward Caste

=== Bhandaris ===
B.D. Satoskar notes that the Naik/Hetkari subcaste of the Bhandari community from the Konkan region served as naval warriors during the Maratha kingdom, with Mainak Bhandari being a notable naval commander. In later periods, members of this community also served in the British Army Called Bhandari Militia. Traditionally, their primary occupation has been toddy tapping. The Bhandari community is classified under the Other Backward Class (OBC) and is one of the largest social groups in Goa.

=== Kalavants ===
Commonly known as Kalavants and now known as Gomantak Maratha Samaj is a group of various sub-castes who served the temples and the aristocrats in the olden days. Gomantak Maratha is relatively a new ameliorative name (coined in the late 20th century) given to these groups for uniting and emancipating them.

=== Artisan castes ===
These include Charis, Chitaris who call themselves Vishwakarma Manu Maya Brahmin, Sutars and Kasars. They are included in the Other Backward Class list of the Government of India. Rest of castes generally referred to as Shudras or Sudirs in Konkani do not really follow the four-fold varna system, but have recently started claiming higher status. Most of them have been practicing different occupations historically and now are categorized as Other Backward Class by Govt of Goa, these include Madval (Rajak, Dhobi), Gosavi, Shimpi, Khumbar, Teli, Nathjogi, this list also includes Roman Catholic counterparts of few Hindu castes too].

=== Scheduled Castes of Goa ===
Following castes are commonly known as Dalits.

- Chambhar
- Mahar
- Mahyavanshi (Vankar)
- Mang

=== Scheduled Tribes of Goa ===
These include the castes Velip, Gauda and Kunbi, which are considered as adivasis in the state of Goa.

=== Historically outside Comunidade ===
==== Dhangars ====
Dhangar, also referred as Gouly or Gavli, is the state's only ancient pastoral community. In Goa under colonialism, the community kept away from the rest of society as they wanted to escape the grazing tax and the ban on Kumeri (shifting cultivation) introduced by the Portuguese Empire. Dhangar leaders claim that they had fled to remote hilly and forested areas to avoid religious persecution and religious conversion. They were not part of the comunidade anywhere in Goa. It is claimed that throughout the Portuguese rule in Goa they were so insulated that not a single Dhangar was converted to Christianity. Their knowledge and experience of deep forests played a major part in finding specific locations to build forts for the Maratha kingdom to flourish. A study carried out by Government of Goa in 2013 stated that the community had a unique identity, and are known for their martial prowess. In Goa, they are classified in the Other Backward Classes category in India's system of reservation.

== Christianity ==
In Goa, mass conversions were carried out by Portuguese Catholic missionaries from the 1510 conquest onwards. The Portuguese clergy imposed Portuguese surnames on the converts at the time of baptism so that it would be difficult to ascertain their original caste. The Portuguese authorities also suppressed untouchability among the converts and attempted to homogenize them into a single class.

However, the converts retained a variation of their caste status based on patrilineal descent from their previous caste affiliations. All Brahmin sub-castes (Saraswats, Padyes and Daivadnyas) were merged into the Christian caste of Bamonns (Konkani: Brahmins). The converts from the Kshatriya and Vaishya Vani castes were merged together as Chardos (Kshatriyas) and those Vaishyas who did not become Chardos formed a new caste called Gauddos. The converts from all the lower castes, as well as the previously Dalit and adivasi groups, were grouped together as Sudirs, equivalent to Shudras. The Bamonns, Chardos and Gauddos have been hierarchically seen as the high castes in the Goan Christian society.

== See also ==
- Hinduism in Goa
- Maratha Clan System
- Christianity in Goa
- Christianity in India
