= Gazetteer of the Union Territory Goa, Daman and Diu =

The Gazetteer of the Union Territory Goa, Daman and Diu is an official publication from the Government of Goa, Daman and Diu. Published in 1979, it contains background information and history about the region.

This book's editor was Dr. V. T. Gune, then Director of Archives, Archaeology, and the Executive Editor and Member Secretary of the Goa Gazetteer Editorial Board. This publication came from the Government of Goa, Daman and Diu's Gazetteer Department (now Government of Goa). It was printed by the Government Central Press of Bombay (now Mumbai).

== History ==
The Goa Gazetteer was founded in 1970, which was nine years after Goa became part of India, nine years following Goa's annexation in 1961. In 2023, it was renamed the Department of Goa Gazetteer and Historical Records. The inaugural edition of the gazette was published in 1979 and was subsequently reprinted in 2009, thirty years after its original release. As of June 2023, there are no announced plans for a new edition.

== Reception ==
This book was published less than two decades after Portuguese rule ended. This probably gets reflected in the attempt to be extra-critical of Portuguese rule, while play-up the positive changes brought in post-1961.
