= Batcara =

1904 Konkani play by Pai Tiatrist

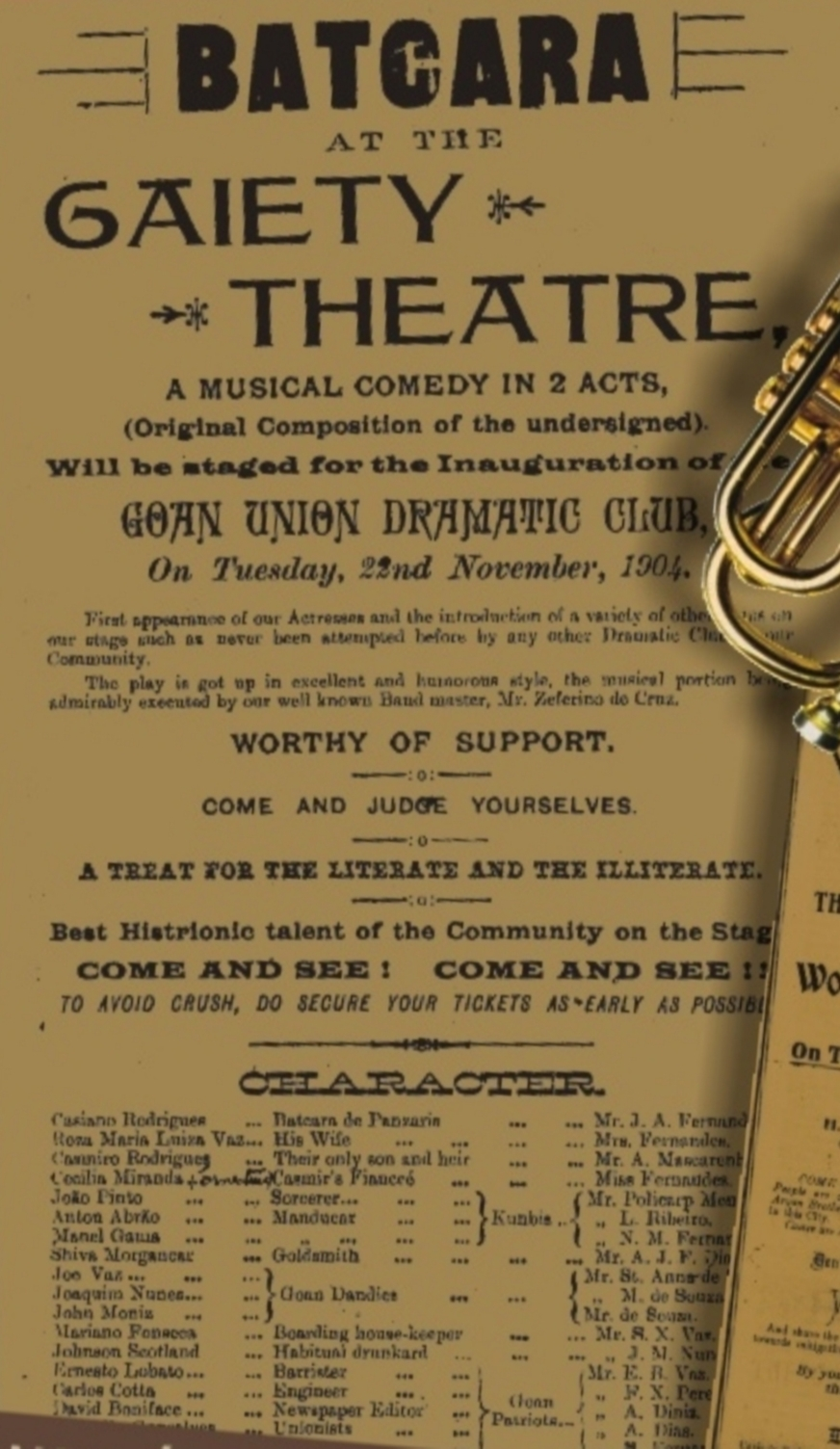
- The original handbill of the play, 1904
- Original language: Konkani
- Written by: João Agostinho Fernandes
- Characters: Casiano Rodrigues; Roza Maria Luiza Vaz; Casmiro Rodrigues; Cecilia Miranda; João Pinto; Mariano Fonseca; Johnson Scotland
- Subject: Casteism in Goa, and atrocities by landlords on kunbis (farmers)
- Genre: Tiatr, comedy drama
- Setting: Ancestral home in Goa, lodging and restaurant in Bombay

Premiere
- Date: 22 November 1904
- Place: Gaiety Theatre, Bombay, British India

Batcara (transl. The Landlord) is a two-act Konkani play written by the Goan playwright João Agostinho Fernandes. First performed at the Gaiety Theatre in Bombay on 22 November 1904, during the inauguration of the Goan Union Dramatic Club, the work is considered a musical comedy. The play was subsequently published on 1 January 1909, marking Fernandes's first play to be printed. It draws inspiration from the author's experiences during the 1896 Bombay plague epidemic and his return to Portuguese Goa. Set in Goa, the play depicts the prevailing caste system and the atrocities committed by landlords against tenant farmers. It also explores themes of Christianity and the concept of equality among people.

== Composition ==
The creation of this play by Fernandes was shaped by his observations during the 1896 Bombay plague epidemic. It represented the inaugural publication among Fernandes' body of works. During the period of the plague outbreak, he voluntarily resigned from his occupation and journeyed back to his native region of Goa. Accompanied by fellow Goans, via a ship he embarked on his fourth voyage to Goa following an extended period away. Spending a period of ten months in Goa, he explored several villages that were under the authority of prominent Goan landholders, which included Margão, Curtorim, Raia, Loutolim, Verna, Navelim, and Chinchinim. Fernandes' composition of the play drew parallels to Joseph Conrad's 1899 novella Heart of Darkness, which was influenced by Conrad's own experiences visiting the Congo Free State in 1890. Both works reflected the authors' personal encounters with colonial settings and dynamics.

During his travels through Goan villages, Fernandes expressed dismay at the prevalence of caste divisions, even in areas that claimed to be civilized and pious. He observed that the predominant attitude among the villagers was one of self-interest and in-group favoritism, rather than universal love and charity as espoused by Christian teachings. Fernandes was troubled to find that these villages, which purported to be bastions of religious devotion, were actually deeply entrenched in caste-based social hierarchies. He noted a common catechism among the villagers: "I for myself and my caste, God for others and people in general." This mentality led Fernandes to question how true Goan unity and Christian charity could ever be achieved as long as the caste system remained deeply rooted. His experiences during this period raised questions for him about the gap between Christian ideals and the realities of social dynamics in Goan communities. He wrestled with the apparent contradiction between the villagers' professed religiosity and their failure to live up to the principles of compassion and inclusivity taught by Jesus Christ.

== Characters ==
Casiano Rodrigues, better known as Batcara de Panzarim, is a wealthy Goan landlord from Panzarim, Goa.

Roza Maria Luiza Vaz is Casiano's wife.

Casmiro Rodrigues is Casiano and Roza's only son and heir to their ancestral properties.

Cecilia Miranda is Casmiro's fiancée.

João Pinto is an illiterate sorcerer and a kunbi.

Anton Abrão is a tenant farmer and a kunbi.

Manel Gauns is the third kunbi among the lot.

Shiva Morgancar is the goldsmith.

Joe Vaz, Joaquim Nunes, and John Moniz are the Goan dandies.

Mariano Fonesca is the boarding housekeeper and proprietor of the lodging in Bombay. He also owns a restaurant.

Johnson Scotland, an Englishman, is the habitual drunkard who is witnessed in a quarrel at Fonseca's restaurant.

Ernesto Lobato is the barrister.

Carlos Cotta is the engineer.

David Boniface is the newspaper editor.

== Synopsis ==
The play is set in the fictional town of Panzarim, which is located in the Portuguese colony of Goa. The central character is Casiano Rodrigues, a Goan landlord who is known by the title "Batcara de Panzarim". He proudly affirms his noble lineage and declares his entitlement to extensive land holdings. Casiano maintains a deliberate aloofness from fellow members of the community in his vicinity. He devotes substantial hours to lounging in a rocking chair, a routine deemed detrimental to his health and prosperity, evident in the emergence of a noticeable pot belly. The play delves into Casiano's hypocrisy as he lectures João Pinto, a village kunbi sorcerer, on the merits of Christian beliefs while falling short in practicing these principles himself. On the other hand, João seeks to boost his earnings by masquerading as a diviner and predictor of fortunes.

Casiano's only child is a son named Casmiro, who holds vastly different beliefs and values compared to his father. Whereas Casiano relies on the inherited wealth of the family's ancestral estates, Casmiro believes in the virtue of earning one's own living through hard work. He harbors resentment towards his father's arrogance and indolence. Initially, his parents, hesitant to see their only son leave, do not readily approve of his aspiration to relocate to the city of Bombay. However, Casmiro's resolute determination to shape his destiny leads his parents to consent to his endeavors in Bombay. His adeptness in the English language proves advantageous in the city. His sojourn in Bombay nurtures a heightened sense of reliance on others. Casmiro faces unemployment following the bankruptcy of the bank where he was employed. Mariano Fonseca, his landlord, demonstrates compassion by letting him stay in his lodgings, he is influenced by Christian principles of benevolence. Fonseca is the proprietor of a restaurant where an Englishman named Johnson Scotland, often seen inebriated, is witnessed causing amusement through his actions, leading to a dispute.

During his time in Bombay, Casmiro is inspired by the Goan Union's impartial social welfare initiatives that transcend caste barriers. Motivated by their inclusive ethos, he chooses to join the organization as a member. Casiano, Casmiro's father travels to Bombay to visit his son, and during this trip, he becomes aware of the existence of wealthier individuals in society beyond the Goan landlords, including himself. Casmiro uses this opportunity to illustrate to his father the detrimental impact of restricting social interactions solely to one's own caste group. Casmiro acknowledges that his survival was made possible by the support and aid from friends who, despite not being as prosperous as him, extended help during his challenging moments. This revelation prompts Casiano, who had adhered staunchly to biased convictions, to recognize the significance of unity in fostering substantial social changes. Consequently, he opts to join the Goan Union, understanding the importance of collaboration and setting aside differences for societal progress.

== History of the play ==
Batcara is considered an important work in the history of Konkani tiatr, the traditional Konkani theatre form. This production featured the first appearances of female actors on the Konkani stage. Prior to Batcara, the Konkani tiatr had been an exclusively male-dominated theatrical tradition. The playwright of Batcara introduced his own wife, Regina Fernandes, as the first female performer in Konkani tiatr. She played three different roles in the production, with her portrayal of the landlord's wife, Roza Maria Luiza Vaz, being particularly acclaimed. She played her role opposite her husband. In addition to Regina, the play also featured two other female actors - Carmelina Fernandes, Regina's sister, and N. Gomes. This pioneering inclusion of women in Konkani tiatr predated similar developments in Marathi and Bengali theatre by around three decades.
