= Brazinho Soares Kalapurkar =

Indian writer and playwright (born 1938)

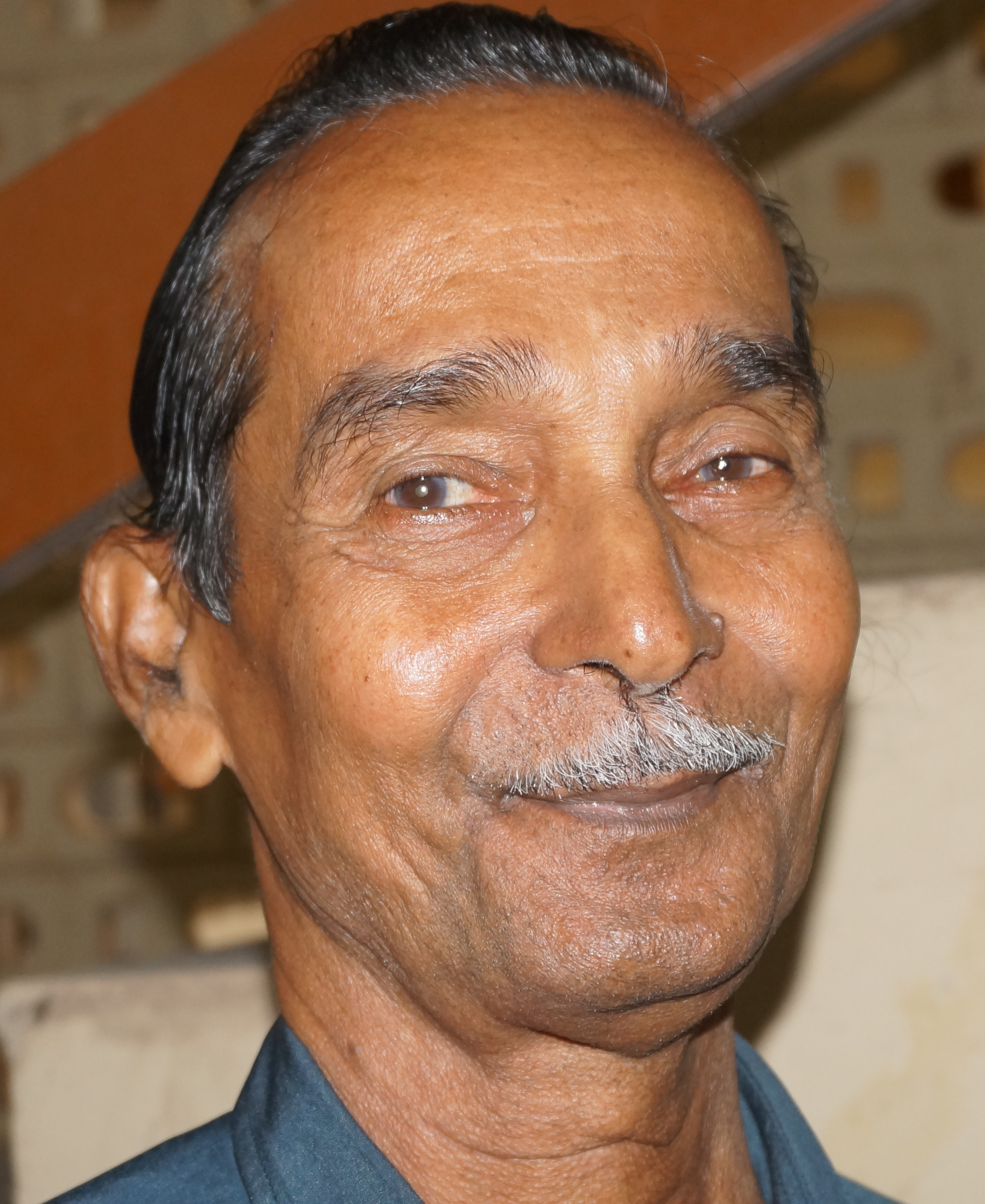
- Soares in 2015
- Born: Brazinho de Santa Nunila Soares; 24 October 1938 (age 87); Calapor, Goa, Portuguese India
- Other name: Brazinho De Vanta Nunila Soares
- Occupations: Writer; playwright; actor; critic; archivist
- Years active: 1958–present
- Spouse: Natalina Fernandes (m. 1964)
- Children: 1

Brazinho de Santa Nunila Soares (born 24 October 1938), known by his pen name Brazinho Soares Kalapurkar, is an Indian writer, playwright, theatre actor, theatre critic, theatre archivist, and former singer known for his work in tiatr (musical theatre) productions.

== Early life ==
Young Soares was known for his extensive collection of publications from Bombay (now Mumbai), India. While employed at Dr. Tamba's laboratory, where Dr. Tamba would eventually join Escola Médica Cirúrgica de Goa, Soares dedicated his free time to perusing a range of news publications originating from Bombay. At a particular moment, a close associate of Soares, who shared a musical education background with him from a parish school, gifted him a copy of the periodical Aitarachem Vachop published by the Salesians. He was a friend of Soares, who worked at a printing press, and recommended that Soares try his hand at composing a poem. Soares composed a poem and submitted it to the periodical, where it was published by the then-editor Fr. Caitan Lobo, an event which appears to have encouraged Soares' interest in writing and publishing.

Soares habitually perused news periodicals, retrieving them and storing them safely at his home. Over the years, he developed an avid interest in collecting publications from Bombay, amassing a large collection that included magazines such as Sot, Sot Uloi, and Cine Times, as well as local Konkani language handbills he found on the streets. Commencing in 1953, he initiated the assembly of this assortment, which expanded considerably as the years passed, eventually occupying a substantial portion of his family's residence. In 1986, as Soares' family required home renovations, the collection was transferred to an alternative site. However, when it was returned a few months later, Soares uncovered that the majority of the materials had succumbed to destruction caused by termites. Saddened by this loss, Soares had to burn the damaged items, an experience that reportedly caused him great distress.

== Career ==
=== Konkani literature: writing and editing ===
Soares has contributed to Konkani literature since the late 1950s. His literary career began with the publication of his first poem, Doriachem Ojeap (1958), in the Konkani weekly Aitarachem Vachop. Throughout his professional career, Soares has written and contributed to a wide range of literary works, such as articles, short stories, essays, plays, and poems. His work has appeared in a wide range of periodicals, such as Ave Maria, Vauraddeancho Ixtt, A. Vanguarda, Porjecho Adhar, Goan Express, Vauraddi, Cine Times, The Goa Mail, Udentichem Noketr, Goencho Sad, Sot, Divtti, Uzvadd, Loksad, Gõykar, Novem Goem, Goencho Avaz, Goenchem Ful, Konkan Mail, O Heraldo, Goan Sports Weekly, Dor Mhoineachi Rotti, Konknni, Arso, Gulab, Goencho Porzoll, The Goan Review, Goenchim Kinnam, Goencho Pormoll, Goencho Fuddari, and Jivit, among others. Soares has also served in editorial roles, working as the assistant editor for several Konkani monthlies, including Karnaval, Goencho Gulab, Hea Sonvsarant, and Konknni Neketracho Uzvadd. He has also authored and released two literary works: Mogachi Doulot (Poems) and Oparincho Jhelo (Collection of proverbs). Additionally, his works in Konkani have been showcased in the compilation, Who is Who of Indian Writers, by the Sahitya Akademi.

Soares's interest in literature began with Romi Konkani books and news publications, at a time when this activity was not widely practiced by the general populace. He is an avid reader of Konkani literature, with a particular fondness for the works of fellow Konkani writer Reginald Fernandes, who was known as the "King of Konkani Fiction". There were frequent exchanges of communication between Soares and Fernandes.

=== Chronicler and critic of tiatrs ===
Soares is a chronicler of the tiatr form of Konkani theater. He authored several Konkani stories and tiatr plays over the course of his career. He has researched and chronicled the historical evolution of Konkani tiatr, meticulously recording the events and progressions in the Konkani theatre. During the mid-1990s, Soares frequently shared his insights on theater in newspapers.

=== Participation in tiatrs: Singing, acting, writing and directing ===
Apart from his contributions to literature and criticism, Soares engaged in writing, directing, and acting in tiatr dramas like Ho To Monis (This is the Man) and Soddvonddar Mel'llo. Soares performed alongside three fellow actors in the latter production. Additionally, his popular tiatr productions included Mogacho Xevott Simiterint (1970), Konn to Khuni (1980), and Bhutanchem Ghor (Ghost House), with the first two works being published as books, in addition to their theatrical productions.

Soares initiated his acting career during his attendance at parochial school by portraying a blind boy in the popular tiatr Jurament Bhogsonam, written by Luis Gonsalves. He went on to distinguish himself in the Kala Academy's Tiatr Competition, winning the first prize for Best Setting three years in a row from 1977 to 1979, for theatrical works penned by Caetano Pereira. Over the course of his career, Soares has acted in several other popular Konkani tiatrs, including Kirmidor Bhav by Anthony Pereira, Norton Advogad by Paulino Dias, Noxibantlem Chukonnam by Peter Fernandes, and Bebdo Put by Gabrial Moraes. In addition to his acting work, Soares has been recognized for his literary accomplishments. In 1982, he won the second prize in the Ave Maria Furtado Award competition for his poem at an event held in Doha, Qatar. In 1992, he won the second prize in the Konkani Tiatristanchi Sonvstha's Tiatr Script Writing Competition for his work Konn To Khunni.

In his early career, Soares was involved in the tiatr performance scene as a singer in productions such as Angvonnecho Put by Frank de Santa Cruz and Kallokuch Kallokh by Caitano Pereira, among others. In the theatrical play Goenchi Suttka, authored by F.X. Dias, he took on four different roles.

=== Collector of tiatr handbills ===
Apart from his roles in tiatr as a performer and writer, Soares has amassed a collection of Konkani literary works and scarce tiatr handbills for preservation in his personal library. As of October 2015, Soares' collection comprised over 2,000 Konkani books and in excess of 1,000 historical tiatr handbills originating from the Portuguese colonial period in Goa. Soares has shared his extensive collection with wider audiences on several occasions. In 2007, he was invited by the Kuwait Goans Tiatristanchi Sonvstha (Kuwait Goan Tiatr Artists' Association) to hold an exhibition of his tiatr handbills and books in Kuwait. He was requested by the Dalgado Konknni Akademi to exhibit his collection during their event Tisrem Konknni (Romi Lipi) Sahitya ani Sonvskruti Sommelon and by the Kala Academy Goa for the Celebration of 100 years of Tiatr in 1992. A 2016 article, titled, Collection of Handbills, on the Sahapedia platform, featured a collection of handbills from Soares' collection of tiatr productions, spanning the years 1956 to 2001.

== Personal life ==
Soares is a resident of the Dando ward in St. Cruz, Goa. Soares' home contains a substantial collection of handbills, publications, and other materials related to the tiatr theatrical tradition and the Romi Konkani dialect.

Accounts have described Soares as being something of an "addict, lover, or crazy collector" of these items. During his early years, to support his collecting passion, Soares was known to carefully save his small daily breakfast allowance of 75 paise (0.79¢ US) in order to quickly purchase books or newspapers before others could acquire them. Soares frequently allocated a significant portion of his funds to purchasing Romi Konkani literature. He would also occasionally take time off from work to travel the 30 km (19 mi) to Margão, in order to expand his collection of Romi Konkani books.
