= Zagor (folk drama) =

Indian folk drama

Coordinates: 15.614537°N 73.770447°E

Zagor (Konkani: जागर), (nocturnal vigil), mainly celebrated in Siolim, in Bardez taluka of Goa is a festival including dance, drama and music.
