= Gauda and Kunbi =

Aboriginal people from Goa, India

Gaudas are aboriginal people residing in the coastal Indian state of Goa. They are believed to be the original inhabitants of Konkan. Most follow folk Hinduism, but many were converted to Catholicism by the Portuguese missionaries during the Christianisation of Goa while still keeping their folk tradition and culture alive.

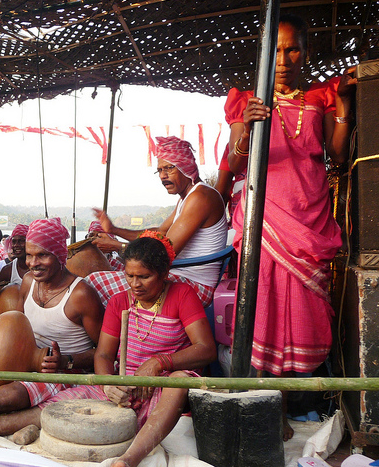
Kunbis of Goa, wearing traditional clothing

== Current social status ==
They are categorised as category I by Government of India along with Velip community. Original Gawda (गौड) community is now known as Gawada (गावडा) community.

== Modern organisations ==
Gaudas, Kunbis, Velip and another shepherding tribe called the Dhangar, have organised themselves into an aboriginal-focussed network, called The Gauda, Kunbi, Velip and Dhangar Federation (GAKUVED). Another Adivasi-rights resource center, called MAND, also works for their betterment.

== Shuddhi movement ==
In the late 1920s, prominent Goan Hindu Brahmins requested Vinayak Maharaj Masurkar, the prelate of a Vaishnava ashram in Masur, Satara district; to actively campaign for the 're-conversion' of Catholic Gaudas to Hinduism. Masurkar accepted, and together with his disciples, subsequently toured Gauda villages singing devotional bhakti songs and performing pujas. On 23 February 1928, many Catholic Gaudas were reconverted to Hinduism, notwithstanding the opposition of the Church and the Portuguese government. The converts were given Hindu names, but the Portuguese government put impediments in their way to get legal sanction to their new Hindu names. 4851 Catholics from Tiswadi, 2174 from Ponda, 250 from Bicholim and 329 from Sattari Catholic Gaudas were re-converted to Hinduism after nearly 400 years. The total number of converts to Hinduism was 7815. The existing Hindu Gauda community refused to accept these neo-Hindus back into their fold because their Catholic ancestors had not maintained caste purity, and the neo-Hindus were now alienated by their former Catholic coreligionists. These neo-Hindus developed into a separate endogamous community, and are now referred to as Nav-Hindu Gaudas (New Hindu Gaudas).
