= Capitol Cinema (Mumbai) =

Theatre in Mumbai, India

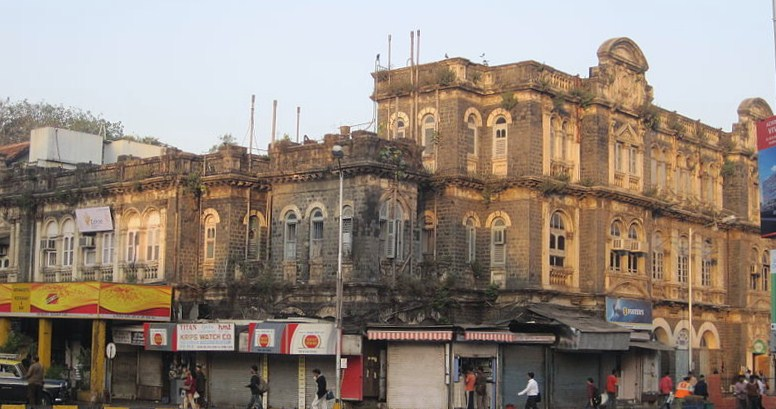
- Capitol Cinema

- Location within Mumbai
- Address: Opposite Chhatrapati Shivaji Terminus; Mumbai; India
- Coordinates: 18.939343°N 72.834313°E

Construction
- Opened: 1928

Capitol Cinema is one of the Mumbai's oldest theatres. Located just opposite Chhatrapati Shivaji Maharaj Terminus, it was built by Kunvarji Paghtivala. It is a Heritage grade II Victorian structure constructed in 1879. Originally a theatre for performing arts known as Tivoli it got its present name in 1928 when it was converted to a Movie theatre. Prior to its renaming to Capitol, it was known as Gaiety Theatre.
