= Roman Catholic Kshatriya =

Chardo
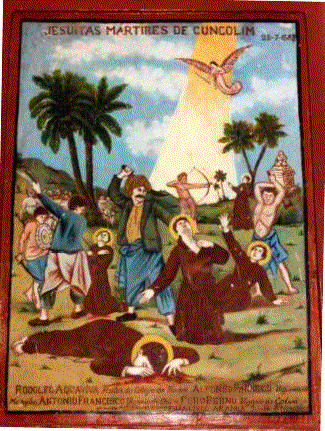
- Martyrs of Cuncolim killed by dhoti clad warriors of pre-Christian Konkani Cxatrias

Languages
- Konkani, British English, Hindi-Urdu and Bombay Mahratti. Previously Indo-Portuguese, Latin and Sanskrit

Religion
- Latin Church in India

Related ethnic groups
- Shetts, Somvanshi Kshatriya Patharees, Daivajnas, Christian Brahmins, Aagri, Koli, Kharvi, Kunbi and Chaukalshis

Roman Catholic Kshatriyas or Christian Kshatriyas (simply Cxatrias in Romi Konkani, Indo-Portuguese and Indian English) are a modern Christianised caste among Goan, Bombay East Indian, Mangalorean, Kudali and Karwari Catholics. They are patrilineal descendants of Kshatriya and Vaishya Vani converts to the Latin Church, in parts of the Konkan region that were under Portuguese Goan rule. They are known as Chardo in Goan Konkani, Charodi (Kanarese Tsāroḍi) in Canarese Konkani and as Sandori or Vadval in Damanese-Maharashtrian Konkani; while others also converted from the Khatri, Panchkalshi, and Sonar subcastes who speak the Bombay East Indian dialect. Some Chardos have maintained endogamy, while others have intermarried with Bamonns.

== Etymology ==
The precise etymology of the word Chardo is unclear. Two most probable explanations are as follows:

- The roots of this Konkani word is said to lie in the Prakrit word Chavda, which is the name of a dynasty who are said to have migrated to Old Goa from Saurashtra in the 7th and 8th centuries, after their kingdom was destroyed by the Sunni Caliphate's conquest in around 740 AD.
- Another explanation given by historian B.D. Satoskar is that the Konkani word comes from the Sanskrit word Chatur-rathi or the Prakrit Chau-radi, which literally means "the ones who ride a chariot yoked with four horses".

== Origins ==
Kshatriyas of the Konkan region were composed of the warrior class, they ranked second in the Hindu Varnashrama system. Those who were into trading by profession, were known as Chattim, which was an occupational appellation common to Brahmans as well. The origins of this Christian caste can be traced back to the Christianisation of the Velhas Conquistas (Portuguese: Old Conquests) by the Portuguese East Indies, during the 16th and 17th centuries. Missionaries of the Jesuit, Franciscan & Dominican Orders converted many Kshatriyas to Christianity. The caste appellation of Chardo eventually fell into disuse among the remaining few Hindu Kshatriyas, who began calling themselves Maratha, in order to differentiate themselves from those Kshatriyas, who had embraced Christianity & to also align themselves with the Hindu Mahrattas in the neighbouring Mahratta Confederacy. The Kshatriyas and Vaishya Vanis, who were among the last to convert & could not be admitted to the Chardo fold identify as Gauddos.

The earliest known instance of Kshatriya conversions to Christianity in what is present-day Goa, took place in 1560, when 700 Kshatriyas were baptised en masse at the Carambolim village of Tiswadi. Their decision to embrace Christianity was made after deliberation of the village assembly, the decision came about as they were subjects of Portuguese rule. Another instance of a Kshatriya group of 200 members being baptized en masse at Batim in Bardez, in August, 1560; the event is mentioned in a letter of a Jesuit missionary, Luís Fróis, dated 13 November 1560.

The Charodis form one of the largest groups in the Mangalorean Catholic community. In South Canara, many Charodis took up service in the army of the Keladi Nayakas, and came to constitute the bulk of the Christian soldiers in their army. The Naik-Lewis families of Kallianpur near Udupi, produced many distinguished soldiers and officers in the Keladi army. In recognition of their service, the Keladi Nayakas rewarded them with large tracts of land in Kallianpur. During the Indian independence struggle, Chardos were perceived by Indian nationalists to be more sympathetic to Indian nationalist leanings and less likely to be pro-European loyalists than Bamonns.

The Chardos have generally been an endogamous group, so they did not inter-marry or mingle with lower castes, while the statutes and norms of the Roman Catholic Church & Portuguese rule prevented them from indulging in Hindu caste based discrimination. Padvals are a subcaste within Roman Catholic Cxatrias of Jain Bunt origin.

== See also ==
- Reddy Catholics
- Kamma Catholic Christians
- Christianisation of Goa
- Christianity in Goa
- Christianity in Karnataka
- Christianity in Maharashtra
- Kadambas of Goa
- Christianity in Damaon
- Christianity in Gujarat
- Cuncolim Revolt
- Mussoll
- Roman Catholicism in Goa
- Roman Catholicism in Bombay
