= People of the Konkan Division =

Ethnic communities residing in the Konkan Division of Maharashtra

The Konkan Division is the administrative division in the coastal region of the Indian state of Maharashtra. It has a diverse number of ethnic and religious communities.

== Communities ==
- Agri
- Bhandari
- Neo-Buddhists
- Chitpavan
- Maratha
- Chaukalshi
- Daivadnya
- Kharvi
- Gaud Saraswat Brahmin
- Bombay East Indians
- Kayastha Prabhu
- Kunbi
- Vaishya vani
- Kupari
- Kumbhar
- Pathare Prabhu
- Somvanshi Kshatriya Pathare
- Samvedi Brahmin
- Konkani Muslims
- Siddis
- Bene Israel
- Konkani Catholics
