= Kamat =

Kamat or Kamath is a surname from Goa, Maharashtra and coastal Karnataka in India. It is found among Hindus of the Goud Saraswat Brahmin, Saraswat and Rajapur Saraswat Brahmin communities following Madhva Sampradaya of either Gokarna Math or Kashi Math.

== Variations ==
Kāmat is a common surname of Konkani Saraswat Brahmins and of a few Konkani Hindus of Goa, Maharashtra, Damaon and Canara. "Kāmat" is mostly used in the Konkan area which includes Goa, Maharashtra and around the North Canara district in Karnataka. Kāmath is used by Brahmins around Dakshina Kannada and Udupi districts and of Karnataka and Hosdurg in Kerala. "Camotim" was used in the erstwhile Portuguese Goa but has given way to "Kāmat" today. "Camat" word is still in use in Indonesia which was a Portuguese colony at some point of time in the history. In Indonesia "Camat" means administrative and political head of the sub-district or taluk. Taluk may be said as kecamatan (spelled as ke-chamatan). The name is also in use among some Konkani Catholics who trace their ancestry to the Goud Saraswat Brahmins of Goa.

== Notable people ==
The following is a list of notable people with last name Kāmat.

- Hari Vishnu Kamath, Freedom fighter and member of the Forward Bloc movement led by Subash Chandra Bose
- Vice Admiral V. A. Kamath, PVSM (1921–2017), the founding Director General of the Indian Coast Guard (1978–1980), Vice Chief of Naval Staff (1973–1977), Led the Southern Naval Area during the Indo-Pakistani War of 1971
- Chandrika Kamath, Computer scientist
- Digambar Kamat, Chief Minister of Goa (2007 to 2012)
- Durgabai Kamat (1899–1997), first actress of Indian cinema, debuted in Mohini Bhasmasur (1913), second movie of Phalke
- Ninad Kamat, Marathi and Hindi actor
- Umesh Kamat, Marathi actor
- K. V. Kamath, Notable banker
- Manvita Kamath, Kannada actress
- Rekha Kamat, Marathi actress

== See also ==
- Christian Brahmins
- Christian Kshatriyas
