= Konkan =

Region of southwest India

- Region
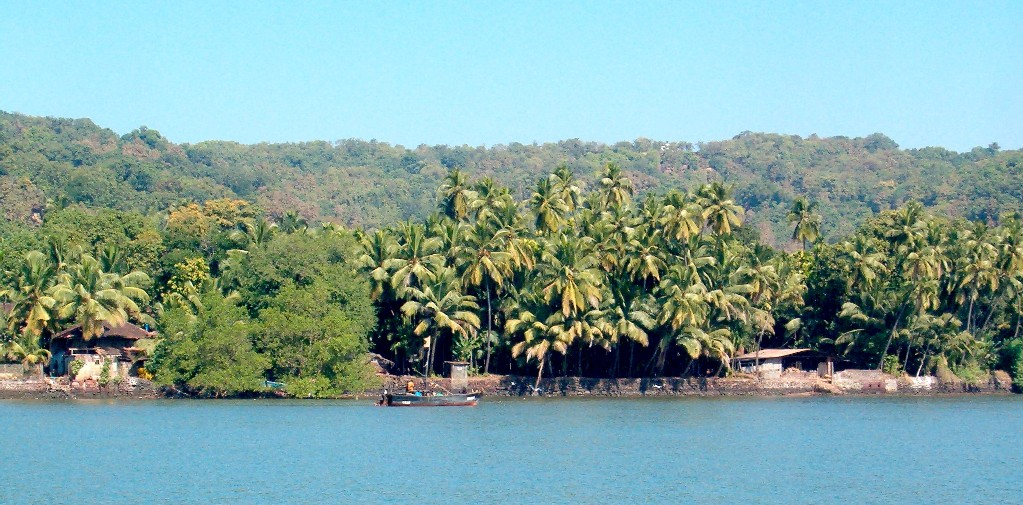
- Dabhol in Ratnagiri district, Konkan division, Maharashtra. Beaches dotted with swaying coconut palms are a ubiquitous sight along the Konkani coast.

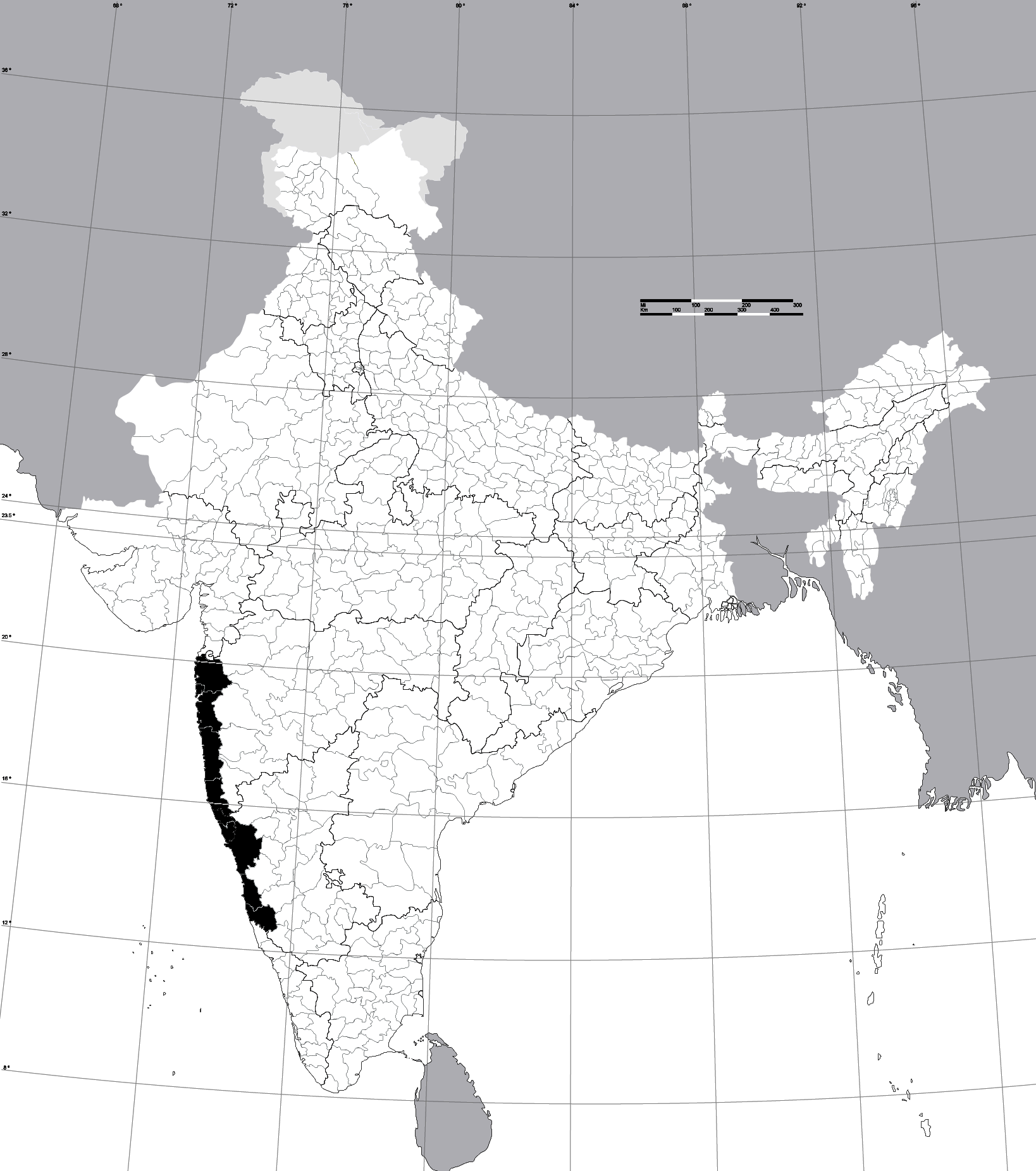
- Districts encompassing the Konkan and Karavali region.
- Country: India

The Konkan is a stretch of land by the western coast of India, bound by the river Daman Ganga at Damaon in the north, to Anjediva Island next to Karwar town in the south; with the Arabian Sea to the west and the Deccan Plateau to the east. The hinterland east of the coast has numerous river valleys, riverine islands and the hilly slopes known as the Western Ghats; that lead up into the tablelands of the Deccan. The Konkan region has been recognised by name, since at least the time of Strabo, in the third century CE. It had a thriving mercantile port with Arab tradesmen from the 10th century onwards. The best-known islands of Konkan are Ilhas de Goa, the site of the Goa state's capital at Panjim; also, the Seven Islands of Bombay, on which lies Mumbai, the capital of Maharashtra & the headquarters of Konkan Division.

== Definition ==
Historically, the limits of Konkan have been flexible, and it has been known by additional names like "Aparanta" and "Gomanchal", the latter being defined as the coastal area between the Daman Ganga River in the north and the Gangavalli River in the south.

The ancient Sapta Konkan was a larger geographical area that extended from Gujarat to Kerala and included the whole region of coastal Maharashtra and coastal Karnataka i.e. Tulunad. However, this segment overlaps the Konkan, Kanara and Malabar Coasts continuum; and usually corresponds to the southernmost and northernmost stretches of these locales respectively.

== Etymology ==
According to the Sahyadrikhanda of the Skanda Purana, Parashurama threw his axe into the sea and commanded the Sea God to recede up to the point where his axe landed. The new piece of land thus recovered came to be known as Saptah-Konkana, meaning "piece of earth", "corner of the earth", or "piece of the corner", derived from Sanskrit words: koṇa (कोण, corner) + kaṇa (कण, piece). Xuanzang, the noted Chinese Buddhist monk, mentioned this region in his book as Konkana Desha; Varahamihira's Brihat-Samhita described Konkan as a region of India; and 15th-century author Ratnakosh mentioned the word Konkandesha.

== Geography ==
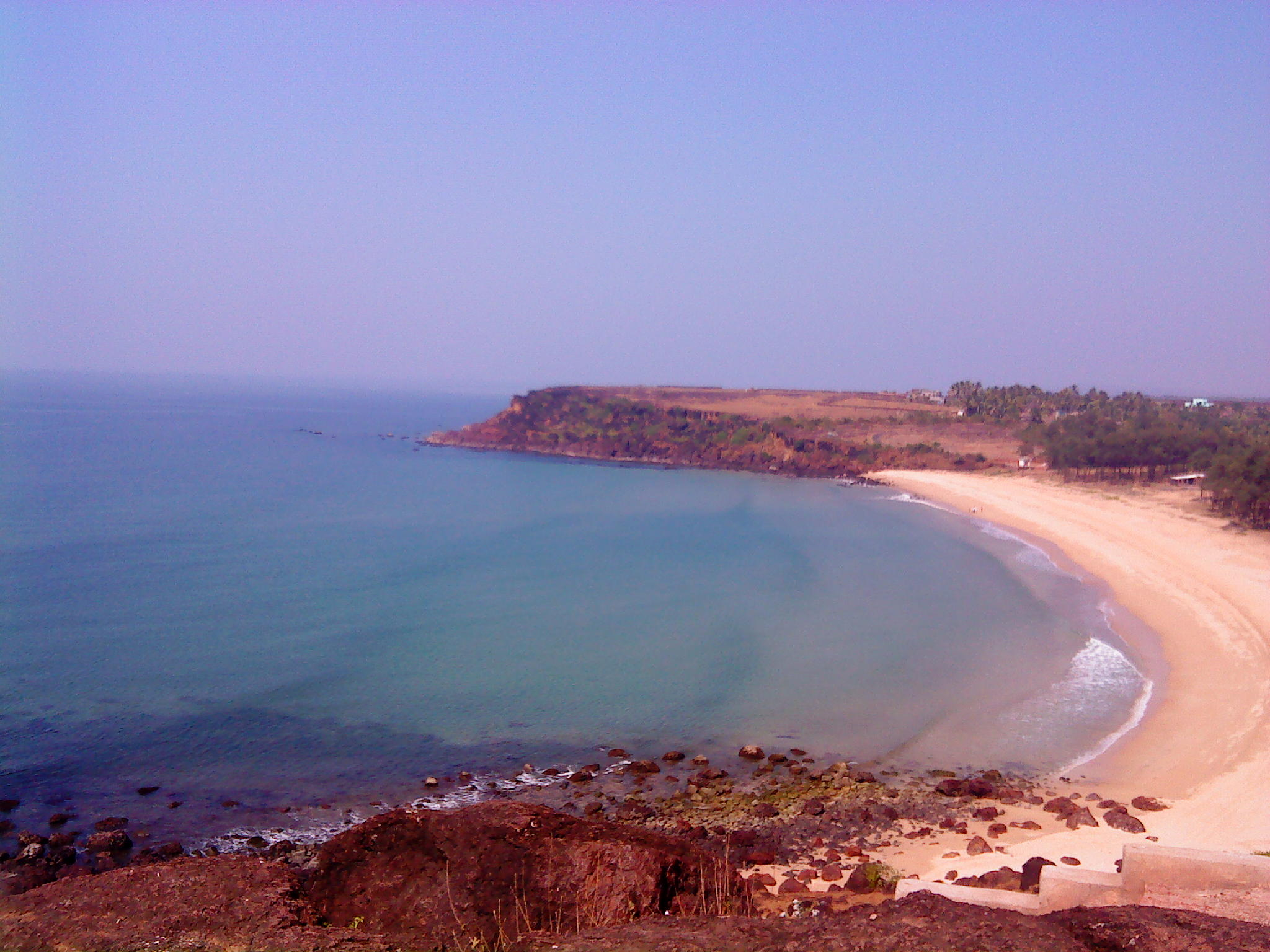
Beach of Devgad taluka, Sindhudurg district, in the State of Maharashtra

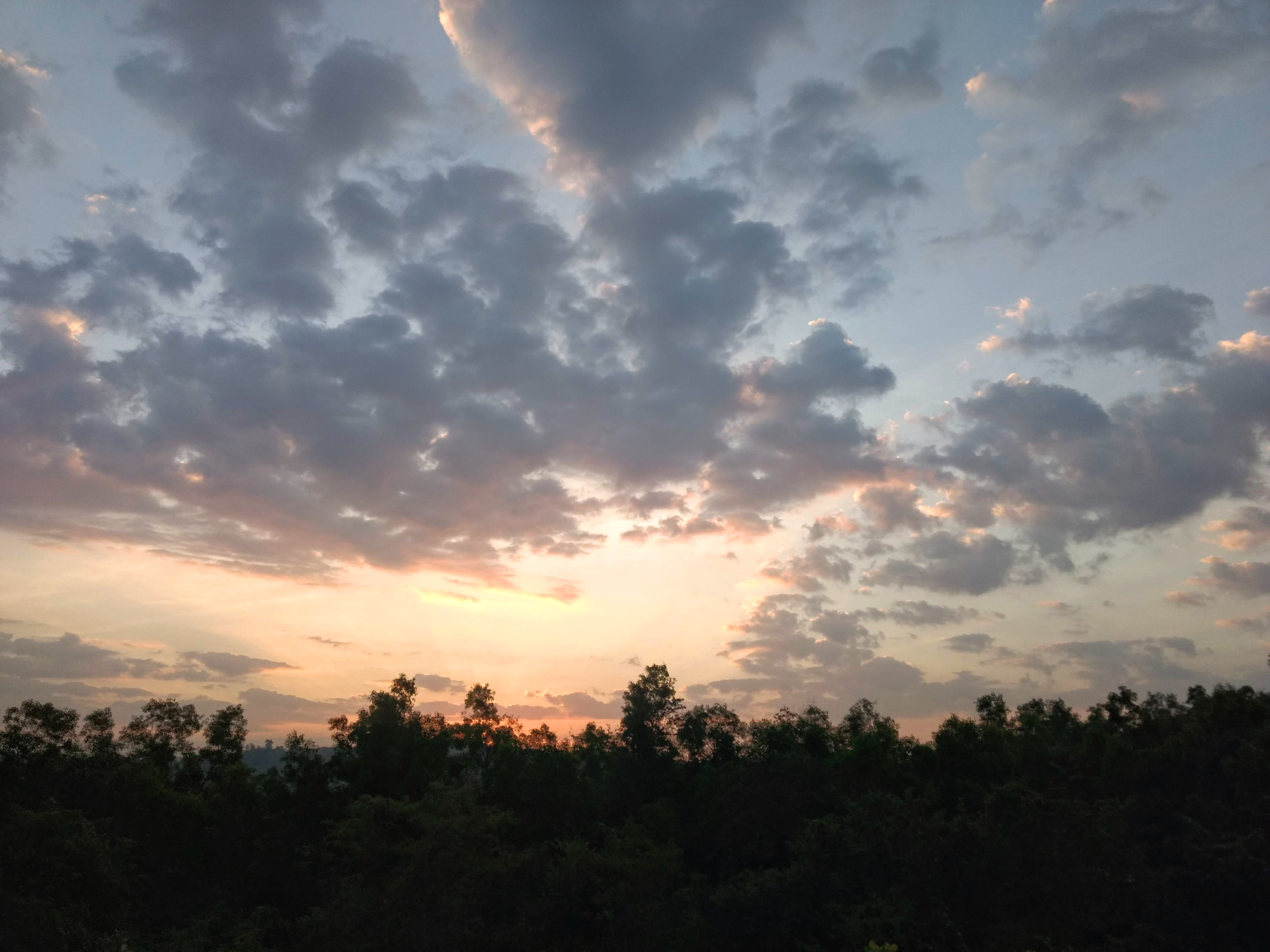
View of the Sahyadri Mountains in the village of Sathare Bambar, Ratnagiri district

The Konkan extends throughout the western coasts of Maharashtra, and Goa. It is bounded by the Western Ghats mountain range (also known as Sahyadri) in the east, the Arabian Sea in the west, the Daman Ganga River in the north, and the Aghanashini River in the south. The Gangavalli flows in the district of Uttara Kannada in present-day Karnataka. Its northern bank constitutes the southernmost portion of Konkan. The towns of Karwar, Ankola, Kumta, Honnavar, and Bhatkal fall within the Konkan coast. The largest city on the Konkan coast is Mumbai, the state capital of Maharashtra. Districts on the Konkan coast are, from north to south:

- Daman
- Palghar
- Thane
- Mumbai Suburban
- Mumbai City
- Raigad
- Ratnagiri
- Sindhudurg
- Uttara Kannada (Karwar to Bhatkal)

== Ethnology ==
The main ethnolinguistic group of the Konkan region is the Konkani people. Specific castes and communities found in the region are the Agri, Koli, Bhandari, Kunbi, Maratha, Gabit, Mangela, Karadi, Phudagi, Vaiti, Kharvi, Teli, Kumhar, Nhavi, Dhobi, Kasar, Sutradhar, Lohar, Chambhar, Mahar, Dhangar, Gaud Saraswat Brahmin (also includes Rajapur Saraswats and Chitrapur Saraswats), Kudaldeshkar, Pathare Prabhu, Gomantak Maratha, Chitpavan Brahmin, Chandraseniya Kayastha Prabhu, Karhade Brahmin, Daivadnya (Sonar), Panchkalshi, Vani, Komarpant, Vadval, Gavli, Ghorpi, Nath Jogi, Gurav, Pagi, Kalan, Ghadi, Padti, Vanjari, Namdev Shimpi and others. Billava, Bunt, Nador (caste), Mogaveera and Lingayats communities found in the parts of Karnataka which are near to Konkan.

Tribal communities include the Katkari, Thakar, Konkana, Warli and Mahadev Koli, mainly found in the northern and central parts of Konkan. The Dubla and Dhodia tribes live in southern Gujarat, Dadra and Nagar Haveli and Palghar district of Maharashtra. Palghar district has the largest percentage of tribal population in Konkan. A small nomadic tribe called the Vanarmare is found in southern parts of Konkan, which was originally associated with the hunting of monkeys. The Gauda and Velip tribes are found in Goa.

The Jewish community called Bene Israel is mainly found in Raigad district. The Christians included Bombay East Indians in North Konkan and Mumbai, Goan Catholics in Goa, Karwari Catholics in Uttara Kannada as well as Mangalorean Catholics in Udupi and Dakshina Kannada.

Major Muslim communities like Konkani Muslims and Nawayaths are scattered throughout the whole region. They are reportedly descendants of people who came from Hadhramaut (in Yemen or South Arabia), some who fled from Kufa in the Euphrates' valley circa 700 CE, North India (Haryana or Punjab), as well as various regions of Arabia and the broader Middle East. The Siddi have their roots in Africa.

== See also ==
- Coromandel Coast
- Furus
- Jaitapur Nuclear Power Project
- Konkan Railway
- Malabar Coast
- People of the Konkan Division
- Tulunad Coast
