= Roman Catholic Brahmin =

Caste of Goan, Bombay East Indian and Mangalorean Christians in India

Roman Catholic Brahmin or Christian Brahmin (IAST Bamonns /baməɳ ~ bamɔɳ/ in Romi Konkani and Kupari in Bombay East Indian dialects) is a Christianised caste among the Goan, Bombay East Indian and Mangalorean Catholics, who are patrilineal descendants of Brahmin and Prabhu converts to the Latin Church. This occurred in parts of the Konkan region that were annexed into the Portuguese East Indies, with the capital (metropole) at Velha Goa, and Bombay (Bom Bahia) was the largest territory (province) of Portuguese India. They retain some of the ethno-social values and customs of their ancestors and most of them exhibit a noticeable hybrid Latino-Concanic culture.

== Origins ==
In Goa, the Brahmins were engaged in the priestly occupation, but had also taken up various occupations like agriculture, trade, goldsmithing, etc. The origins of this particular caste can be traced back to the Christianisation of the Velhas Conquistas (Portuguese: Old Conquests) that was undertaken by the Portuguese, during the 16th and 17th centuries. It was during this period that, the Jesuit, Franciscan and Dominican missionaries converted many Brahmins to Christianity. The first mass conversions took place among the Brahmins of Divar and the Kshatriyas of Carambolim (Karmali).

All converts from Brahmin sub-castes (Chitpavan Brahmins, Deshastha Brahmins, Karhada Brahmins, Saraswat Brahmins etc) and Prabhus were unified into a single Christian caste of Bamonn. Since the conversions of Brahmins of a particular area, were instrumental in the conversions of members of other castes, due to the resulting loss of priests, such converts were highly valued by the church and Portuguese rulers alike.

The Christian Brahmins were even allowed to wear the Yajnopavita (sacred threads) and other caste markings by a special dispensation of Pope Gregory XV in 1623; on the condition that these were to be blessed by a Catholic priest.

The Bamonns in general consider their Indian caste system, to be a class form of social categorisation. Since their concept is divorced from the religious elements associated to it, by their Hindu counterparts, they tend to justify their maintenance of caste as a form of social stratification, similar to the Western class concept. They are an endogamous group and have generally refrained from inter-marriage with Catholic Christians of other castes. However, while the Bamonns never inter-married or mingled with the lower castes, the statutes or norms of the Roman Catholic Church restrained them from practising Hindu caste based discrimination against the latter.

Although most now carry Portuguese surnames, some have retained the knowledge of their ancestral pre-conversion surnames; such as Bhat, Kamat, Nayak, Pai, Prabhu, Shenoy, Shett and others. The konkanised variants of these surnames are Bhôtt, Kāmot, Nāik, Poi, Porbų (Probų), Šeņai, Šet etc. However, only Pundit, Bhatta, Shenoy (Shenvi) and Joshi suggest Brahminical roles; such as priesthood, astrology, etc. The meanings of the other surnames are as follows: Kamath (cultivator or landholder), Nayak (military leader), Dessai (headman), Pai/ Prabhu (lord), Baaliga (soldier) and so on. The Gaud Saraswat Brahmin subcaste was created by Shenoi Goembab in the 19th century, Shenoi found the supporting genealogy of GSBs in the writings of the Christian Brahmin Jose Gerson da Cunha, during this time the Brahminhood of Saraswats was denied by Hindu Marathi Brahmins and Jose was labeled a "defiled Christian" by a Mahratti-speaking Saraswat Brahmin.

Mudartha is a unique surname to be found among some Bamonn families that hail from Udipi district in Karnataka. Some Mangalorean Catholic Bamonn families trace their patrilineal descent to Konkani Saraswat Brahmins. There was one instance in the Mangalorean Catholic community, wherein some Protestant Anglo-Indians were admitted into the Bamonn fold, by Catholic priests at the time of their conversion to Catholic Christianity, their descendants are known as Pulputhru Bamonns (Pulpit Brahmins).

In 1976, a genetic testing study conducted on three groups of Goan Saraswat Brahmins and one group of Goan Catholic Bamonns in Western India; confirmed the historical and ethnological evidence of a relationship between, Goan Catholic Bamonns and Chitrapur Saraswat Brahmins. The study further revealed that intergroup differences between the subject groups suggested a genetic closeness, with genetic distance ranging from 0.8 to 1.5.

Some Christian Brahmins such as the Pinto brothers Jose Antonio and Fransisco from the famous Goan noble family joined the army of Baji Rao II in Poona (Pune), after trying to overthrow Portuguese rule in the Conspiracy of the Pintos.

== In popular culture ==
- In her poem entitled de Souza Prabhu, the Goan poet Eunice de Souza muses about her Bamonn heritage:
  No, I'm not going to
  delve deep down and discover,
  I'm really de Souza Prabhu
  even if Prabhu was no fool
  and got the best of both worlds.
  (Catholic Brahmin!
  I can hear his fat chuckle still.)
- The main protagonist of Mangalorean writer Richard Crasta's erotic novel The Revised Kamasutra is Vijay Prabhu, a small-town, middle-class Bamonn youth living in Mangalore during the 1970s. Filled with erotic longing and a deep desire to flee staunchly conservative Mangalore, he embarks on a sexual and spiritual odyssey that eventually lands him in the relatively liberal United States.
- The protagonists of Konkani novelist V. J. P. Saldanha's novels such as Balthazar from the novel Belthangaddicho Balthazar (Balthazar of Belthangadi), Sardar Simaon and Sardar Anthon from Devache Kurpen (By the Grace of God), Salu and Dumga Peenth from Sordarachim Sinol (The sign of the Knights) are Bamonns. A few characters such as Jaculo Pai and Monna Kamath from Sordarachim Sinol, Sardar Simaon Pedru Prabhu, Sardar Anthon Paul Shet and Raphael Minguel Kamath from Devache Kurpen have evidently Brahmin surnames.
- Antonio Gomes' debut novel The Sting of Peppercorns (2010) focuses on the trials and tribulations faced by the de Albuquerques, a Bamonn family from Loutolim in Salcette. The family is headed by its patriarch Afonso de Albuquerque, a namesake of the conqueror of Goa to whom the family is linked through legend. Apart from him, it consists of his wife Dona Isabella, their two sons Paulo and Roberto, their daughter Amanda, an aunt Rosita noted for her cooking skills, ayah Carmina, and several servants who live on the de Albuquerque estate.
- Shakuntala Bharvani's novel Lost Directions (1996) features a minor Goan Bamonn character, Donna Bolvanta-Bragança. She is a fervent Catholic who takes pride in her Brahmin heritage, scornfully reprimanding the protagonist Sangeeta Chainani for mistaking her to be an Anglo-Indian. When Chainani innocently inquires as to how she can call herself a Brahmin while adhering to Roman Catholicism, her inquiry is contemptuously dismissed by the character.

== Notable persons ==
- Joseph da Cunha
- Gerson da Cunha
- Rodolf Dalgado

== Footnotes ==
1. In his A Konkani grammar published in Mangalore by the Basel Printing Press in 1882, Italian Jesuit and Konkani philologist Angelus Francis Xavier Maffei stated that Mangalorean Catholic Bamonn families then were still referred to by their paik surnames. In the book, Maffei also gives a Konkani language grammar exercise:
  Mezār lugaţ gallāiñgī? Galtāñ.
  Have you covered the table with cloth? I will!
  Suriār kiteñ assā moņ, amkāñ sǎrkeñ kǎļnāñ: zipki mǎnis moņtāt, suriār sǎbār kǎtañ assāt.
  We do not know properly what’s there in the moon: Learned people say that there are many spots in the moon.
  Kitleañ uorānčer amiñ yēzāi? Dånparā yā sānjer.
  At what time should we come? Afternoon or in the evening?
  Amiñ Devā kurpā sāmbaļtāuñ moņasăr, Deu amger rāutā.
  God resides at our home, as long as we keep His grace.
  Pātkiānger Deu rãutãgī? Rāutā, puņ išţa bǎri niñ.
  Does God stay at sinners' home? He stays, but as a friend.
  Tuzo pūtų khǎiñ assā? To seireānger assā.
  Where is your son? He is at a relatives' house.
  Tūñ khǎiñčea gǎrānt assāi? Āuñ Porbuger assāñ, mozo bāu Kāmtiger, moji boiņ Nāikāger, moji māusi Šēţiger, mozo sentur Šeņǎiñger.
  In whose house do you reside? I stay at the Prabhu household, my brother at the Kamath household, my sister at the Naik household, my aunty at the Shet household, my great-grandchild at the Shenoy household.
  Somi Jezu Krist vāur kǎrtālo, teātz jinsār tūñ vāur kǎr ani asseñ sompūrņ zatoloi.
  Everyone should live as Jesus Christ did; Live like him and you will become complete.
  Zōkōņ Jezu Kristāčer sǎtmāndināñ, pātienāñ ani tātso mōg kǎrināñ, takā zǎrti zāun zǎli.
  The man who does not trust, believe in, and love Jesus Christ, will be judged.

== See also ==
- Christianisation of Goa
- Christianity in India
- Christianity in Goa
- Christianity in Karnataka
- Christianity in Maharashtra
- Christianity in Gujarat
- Forward caste
- Caste system among Indian Christians
- Latin Church in India
- Christianity in Pakistan
- Padval
- Konkani people
- Koli Christian
- Gauda and Kunbi
- Roman Catholic Kshatriya
