= Bhandari (caste) =

Caste in western India

- Bhandari men in western India (c. 1855-1862)

Regions with significant populations
- Primary populations in: Goa; Maharashtra; Karnataka

Languages
- Marathi and various dialects of Konkani

Religion
- Hinduism

Related ethnic groups
- Konkani people

The Bhandari is a caste that inhabits the western coast of India. Their traditional occupation was toddy tapping. They were also good naval warriors. They form the largest caste group in the state of Goa, reportedly being over 30% of that state's Hindu population, and play a major role in deciding the future of any political party there. The Bhandaris are included in the Other Backward Class (OBC) list in Goa and Maharashtra. However, in Uttarakhand, Bhandaris are recognized as part of the Rajput community, tracing their lineage back to the reign of Shivaji. Known for their valor, leadership, and warrior spirit, the Bhandari Rajputs have historically played a significant role in governance, administration, and military affairs. Their rich heritage reflects a legacy of bravery, honor, and dedication to their land and people.

== History ==
Bhandaris prefer derivation from Bhandar, which means treasury, because they used to be treasury guards in the past.

Traditionally, their occupation was drawing toddy from palm plants. Historical evidence suggests that they were foot soldiers in the Maratha Empire and British Indian Army. The famous "Hetkaris" in the army of Chhatrapati Shivaji Maharaj were Bhandaris. During Shivaji Maharaj's time, Maynak Bhandari was a chief Admiral.

Bhandaris are divided into various sub-castes such as Kitte, Hetkari, Thale and Gavad. During British Raj, Bhandaris lacked unity among various sub-castes and the differences within these sub-jatis hindered the community progress. The leaders of these sub-castes established their independent caste associations. A Bhandari author from the British era says that they were traditionally active in teaching and learning, and were involved in setting up schools for all castes either in temples or outside someone's house. He says that the community should not blame Brahmins for lack of their education as they did not avail educational opportunities in the British era.

In 1878, the British colonial government passed a law that would enable them to control liquor market in India and maximize profit. This resulted in low quality liquor flooding the market. In protest, the Bhandari community - whose traditional occupation was to ferment toddy - declined to supply toddy to the government.

== Varna status ==
During the British era, M. R. Bodas, a Brahmin pleader, published an article in Chitramay Jagat (1922) where he opined that Bhandari caste was of Shudra origin. This received strong response in another article where the author claimed that the community existed from the era of Mahabharata and that the Bhandaris were originally from Rajputana and were Kshatriya converts to Jainism whose occupation was trading. The author mentioned Sati and Jauhar as proof for their heritage. The article by Bodas piqued the Bhandari community and the community members met in 1922 to address the issue. Tukaram Padaval, who belonged to Bhandari caste and a close associate of Jyotiba Phule, said that the claim to Kshatriya status was common among many upper and lower castes but there was no certainty at all as to who among them are the original Kshatriyas.

== See also ==
- People of the Konkan Division
- Bhandari Militia
