= Gabit =

Gabit is a community found in the Konkan regions of the Indian states of Goa. Karnataka and Maharashtra.

In Goa, they are distinct from the Kharvi community found mostly in the south of that state, although they share a similar traditional occupation. The Gabits are primarily a fishing community and are concentrated in the northern talukas of Canacona, Pernem and Salcete. They are Malvani-speaking Hindus and generally live in joint family arrangements, although a movement towards the nuclear family is evident.
