= Padval =

Subgroup of the Christian caste

Padval is a subgroup of the Christian Cxatria caste, bearing the same paik surname among Mangalorean Catholics, they converted from the Jain Bunt varna that is native to Canara in Karnataka.

== History ==
A large number of Goan Catholics immigrated to Canara in the 16th and 17th centuries due to various causes. Padvals were the local Catholic converts of South Canara and did not mix with these Christian immigrants from Goa. In The Marriage Customs of the Christians in South Canara, India (1965), Severine Silva speculated that the Padvals in the Christian community were converts from Jainism.

According to Mangalorean genealogist Michael Lobo, the major Padval clans are the Rodrigues family of Ambepol, Bantwal, Bejai, Nod and Kadri; Tauro family of Bantwal, Kodialbail and Kankanadi; Lobo family of Bellore, Derebail and Mermajal; and D'Souza family of Bejai, Kadri and Vamanjoor.

== See also ==
- Christianity in Karnataka
- Roman Catholicism in Mangalore
- Roman Catholic Brahmin
- Roman Catholic Kshatriya
- Forward caste
- Konkani people
- Tulu Jains
