= Vartak =

Vartak is an Indian surname found in the Konkan in Kelshi Maharashtra.

== Chitpavan (Kokanastha brahmin) Vartaks ==
Vartak is a Hindu surname found among the caste of Chitpavan Kokanastha Brahmins, the origin of the Vartak chitpavans supposedly was in the small coastal village of Kelshi (240 km from Mumbai, 54 km from Dapoli).

== Somvanshi Kshatriya Vartaks ==
Vartak surname is also common among Somvanshi Kshatriya Pathare, a small community residing on the outskirts of Mumbai (formerly Bombay), on the western shores of India. The settlements are mostly around Vasai, Virar, Agashi, Saphale, Kelve Road, Palghar, Mahim, Kelawa, Boisar, Tarapur, Chinchani, Vangaon, Bordi, Gholvad and Dahanu Road. This community is also known as Panch Kalshi, Choukalshi, Vadval. Somvanshi literally translates to descendants of the Moon.

There are many educational institutions like English medium high school, Vidyavardhini's Bhausaheb Vartak Polytechnic, and Vidyavardhini's College of Engineering and Technology around Vasai area founded by Late Padmashri H. G. alias Bhausaheb Vartak and Hon’ble Smt. Tarabai Vartak.
