= Christianization of Goa =

Conversion of population to Christianity

The indigenous population of the erstwhile Portuguese colony of Goa, Daman and Diu was Christianised following the Portuguese conquest of Goa in 1510 and the subsequent establishment of the Goan Inquisition. The converts in the Velhas Conquistas (Old Conquests) to Catholic Christianity were then granted full Portuguese citizenship. Almost all of the present-day Goan Christians are descendants of these native converts; they constitute the largest Indian Christian community of Goa state and account for 25 percent of the population, as of 2011 Census of India.

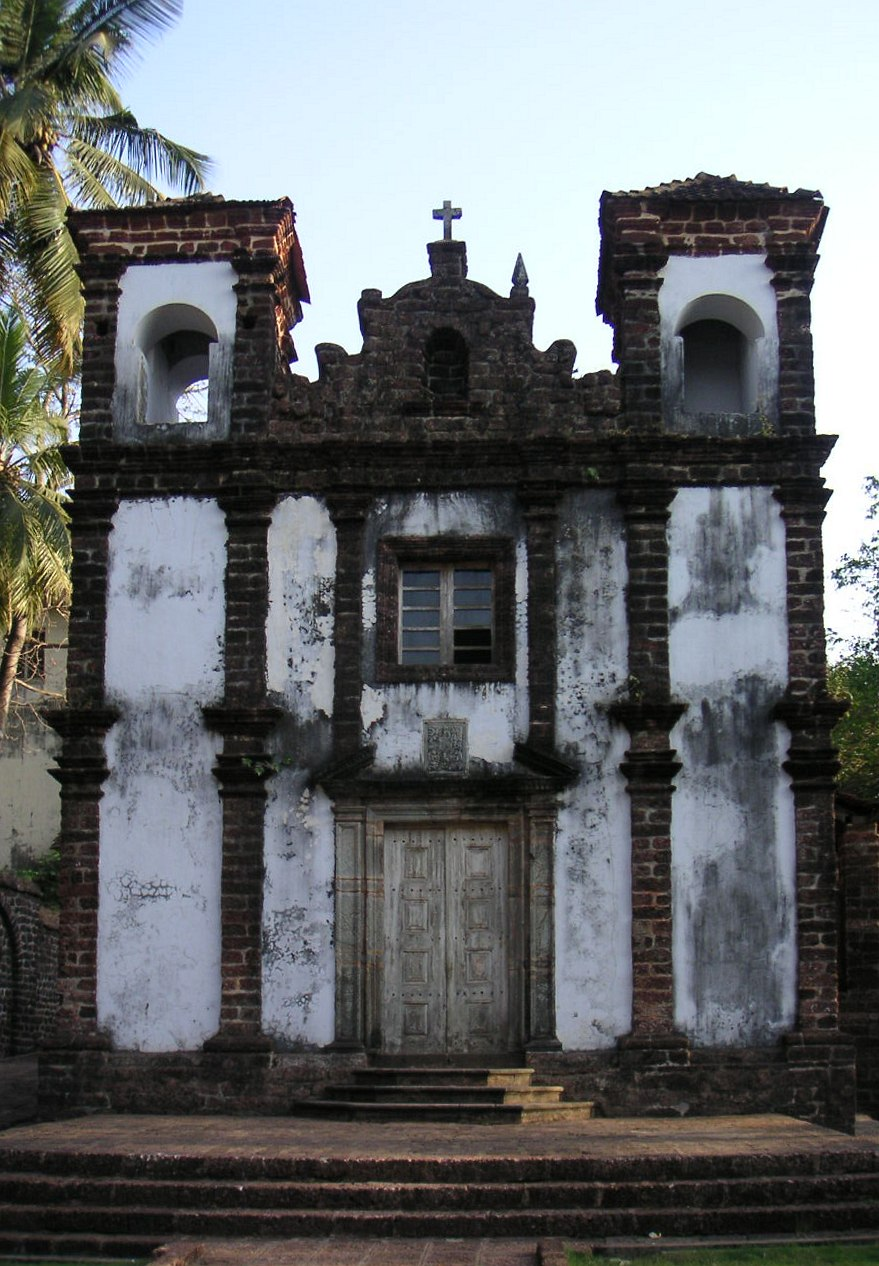
Chapel of St. Catherine, built in Old Goa during Portuguese rule. It should not be confused with the Cathedral of Santa Catarina, also in Old Goa.

Many Kudali, Mangalorean and Karwari Catholics in present-day Karnataka and Maharashtra share common origins with Goans, due to migration in the 16th and 17th centuries. Korlai and Bombay East Indian Catholics of the Konkan division, and the Damanese of Damaon, Diu & Silvassa have had Goan admixture and interactions in the Portuguese Bombay territory, which was ruled from the capital at Old Goa. Bombay East Indians were formerly Portuguese citizens until the Seven Islands of Bombay were taken over by the English East India Company, via the dowry of Catherine de Braganza, in marriage to Charles II of England. Salsette islanders and Basseinites of the Bombay East Indian community were also Portuguese citizens, until the Mahratta Invasion of Bassein in 1739.

== Pre-Portuguese Era ==
It has been said that prior to the en-masse Christianization, there were a few communities of Eastern Christians (Nestorians) present in the age-old ports of Konkan, that were caught up in the Spice trade and the Silk Route. The conversion of the Indo-Parthian (Pahlavi) King Gondophares (abbreviated Gaspar) into the Thomasine Church, and the finding of a Persian Cross in Goa, are subjects of ongoing debate and research.

== Conversion to Christianity ==
The first converts to Christianity in Goa were native Goan women who married Portuguese men that arrived with Afonso de Albuquerque during the Portuguese conquest of Goa in 1510.

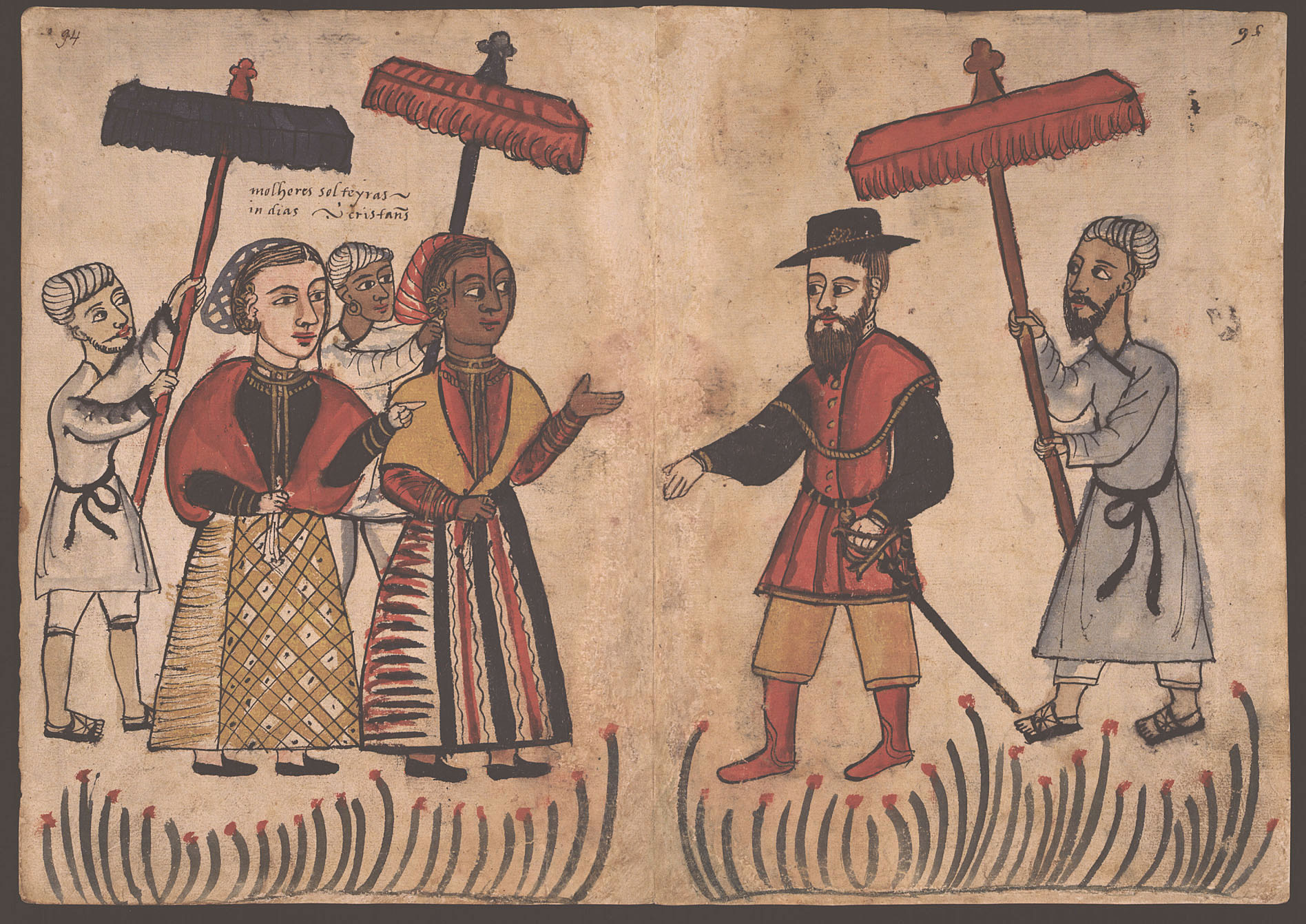
Christian maidens of Goa meeting a Portuguese nobleman seeking a wife, from the Códice Casanatense (c. 1540)

During the mid-16th century, the city of Goa, was the center of Christianization in the East. Christianization in Goa was largely limited to the four concelhos (districts) of Bardez, Mormugao, Salcette, and Tiswadi. Furthermore, evangelization activities were divided in 1555 by the Portuguese viceroy of Goa, Pedro Mascarenhas. He allotted Bardez to the Franciscans, Tiswadi to the Dominicans, and Salcette, together with fifteen southeastern villages of Tiswadi, including Chorão and Divar, to the Jesuits. The city of Old Goa was shared among all, since all the religious orders had their headquarters there. Prior to that, the Franciscans alone christianized Goa till 1542. Other less active orders that maintained a presence in Goa were the Augustines, Carmelites, and Theatines.

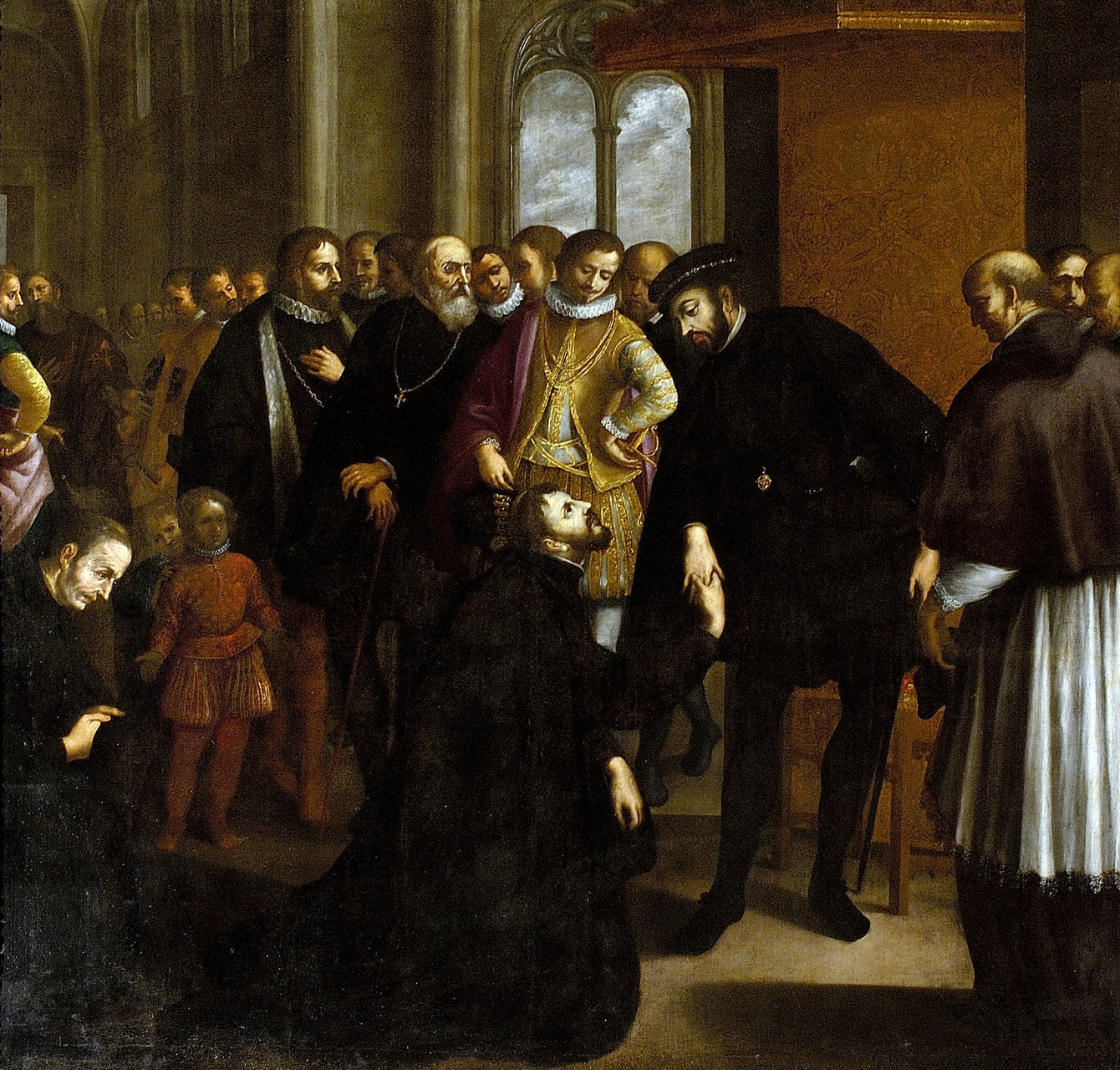
Jesuit missionary Francis Xavier taking leave of John III of Portugal before his departure to Goa in 1541, by Avelar Rebelo (1635)

The first mass conversions took place among the Brahmins of Divar, and the Kshatriyas of Carambolim. In Bardez, Mangappa Shenoy of Pilerne converted to Christianity in 1555, adopting the name Pero Ribeiro and thus becoming the first native Christian male convert of Bardez. His conversion was followed by that of his brother Panduranga and his uncle Balkrishna Shenoy, who is the direct patrilineal ancestor of Goan historian José Gerson da Cunha. In Salcette, Raia was the first village to have been Christianized, when its populace converted en masse to Christianity in 1560.

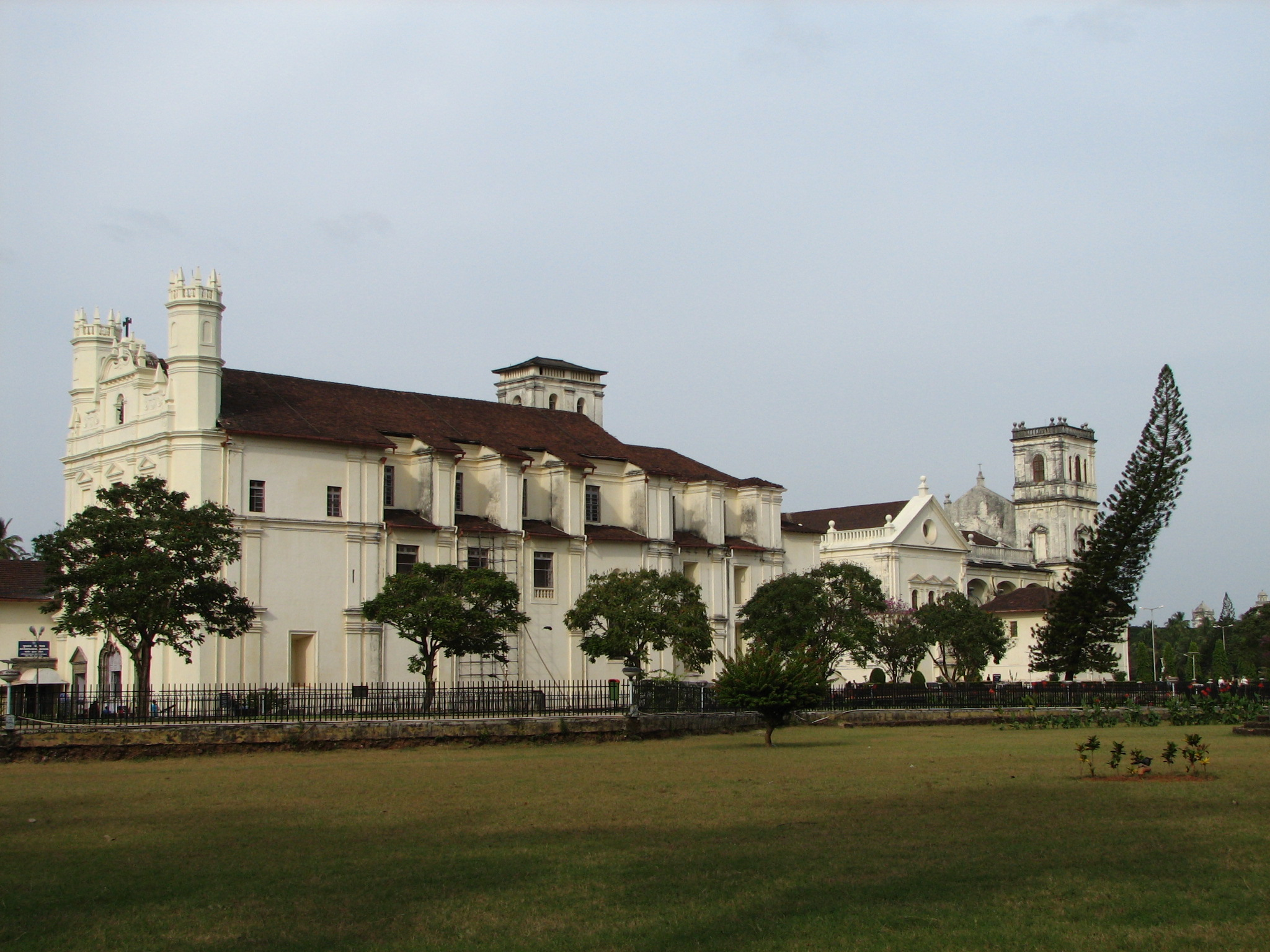
A view of the Se Cathedral

In 1534, Goa was made a diocese and in 1557 an archdiocese. The Archbishop of Goa was the most important ecclesiastic of the East, and was from 1572 called the "Primate of the East". The Portuguese rulers implemented state policies encouraging and even rewarding conversions among Hindu subjects. Conversion was aided by the Portuguese economic and political control over the Hindus, who were vassals of the Portuguese crown.

=== Name changes ===
The process of Christianization was simultaneously accompanied by Lusitanization, as the Christian converts typically assumed a Portuguese veneer. The most visible aspect was the discarding of old Konkani Hindu names for new Portuguese Catholic names at the time of Baptism. The 1567 Provincial Council of Goa — under the presidency of the first Archbishop of Goa Gaspar Jorge de Leão Pereira, and then under the presidency of his successor Jorge Temudo — passed over 115 decrees. One of them declared that the Goan Catholics would henceforth not be permitted to use their former Hindu names.

The converts typically adopted the surnames of the Portuguese priest, governor, soldier or layman who stood as godfather for their baptism ceremony. For instance, the Boletim do Instituto Vasco da Gama lists the new names of some of the prominent ganvkars (Konkani: Freeholders). Rama Prabhu, son of Dado Vithal Prabhu from Benaulim, Salcette, became Francisco Fernandes; Mahabal Pai, son of Nara Pai, became Manuel Fernandes in 1596. Mahabal Kamat of Curtorim became Aleisco Menezes in 1607, while Chandrappa Naik of Gandaulim became António Dias in 1632. In 1595 Vittu Prabhu became Irmão de Diogo Soares and the son of Raulu Kamat became Manuel Pinto in Aldona, Bardez. Ram Kamat of Punola became Duarte Lobo in 1601, while Tados Irmaose of Anjuna became João de Souza in 1658.

Since in many cases, family members were not necessarily baptized at the same time, this would lead to them having different surnames. For instance in 1594, the son of Pero Parras, a ganvkar from Raia acquired at baptism the new name of Sebastião Barbosa. Later in 1609, another of his sons converted and took the name of João Rangel. As a result, members of the same vangodd (clan) who initially all shared a common Hindu surname ended up adopting divergent Lusitanian ones.

=== New laws ===
Various orders issued by the Goa Inquisition included:

- All qadis were ordered out of Portuguese territory in 1567
- Non-Christians were forbidden from occupying any public office, and only a Christian could hold such an office;
- Hindus were forbidden from producing any Christian devotional objects or symbols;
- Hindu children whose father had died were required to be handed over to the Jesuits for conversion to Christianity;
- Hindu women who converted to Christianity could inherit all of the property of their parents;
- Hindu clerks in all village councils were replaced with Christians;
- Christian ganvkars (freeholders) could make village decisions without any Hindu ganvkars present, however Hindu ganvkars could not make any village decisions unless all Christian ganvkars were present; in Goan villages with Christian majorities, Hindus were forbidden from attending village assemblies.
- Christian members were to sign first on any proceedings, Hindus later;
- In legal proceedings, Hindus were unacceptable as witnesses, only statements from Christian witnesses were admissible.
- Hindu temples were demolished in Portuguese Goa, and Hindus were forbidden from building new temples or repairing old ones. A temple demolition squad of Jesuits was formed which actively demolished pre-16th century temples, with a 1569 royal letter recording that all Hindu temples in Portuguese colonies in India have been demolished and burnt down (desfeitos e queimados);
- Hindu priests were forbidden from entering Portuguese Goa to officiate Hindu weddings.

== Impact of Christianity on the caste system ==
However, the converted Hindus retained Konkani as their mother tongue and their caste status even after becoming Christian. Based on their previous caste affiliations, the new converts were usually lumped into new Catholic castes. All Brahmin subcastes (Goud Saraswat Brahmins, Padyes, Daivadnyas), goldsmiths and even some rich merchants, were lumped into the Christian caste of Bamonns (Konkani: Brahmins). The converts from the Kshatriya and Vaishya Vani castes became lumped together as Chardos (Kshatriyas) and those Vaishyas who didn't become Chardos formed a new caste Gauddos. The converts from all the lower castes were grouped together as Sudirs, equivalent to Shudras. The Bamonns and Chardos have been traditionally seen as the high castes in the Goan Catholic caste hierarchy.

=== Persistence of the caste system ===
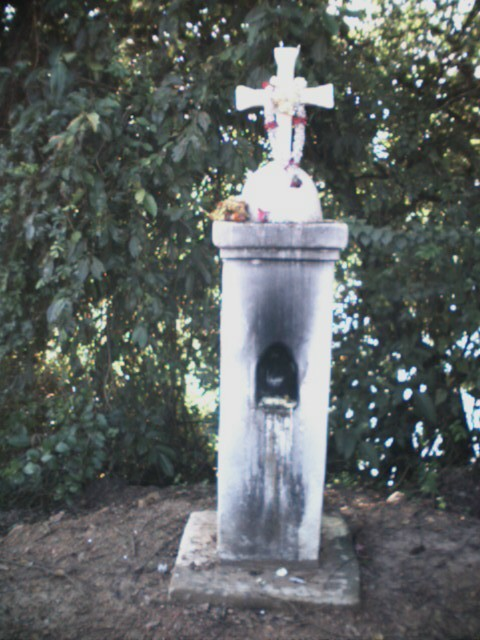
A typical white Sant Khuris (Holy Cross), of a Goan Catholic family, constructed in the style of Portuguese architecture

The Portuguese attempted to abolish caste discrimination among the local converts and homogenize them into a single entity. Caste consciousness among the native converts was so intense that they even maintained separate Church confraternities. In church circles, the Bamonn and Chardo converts were rivals and frequently discriminated against each other. Caste discrimination even extended to the clergy. However, some non-Bamonn priests did achieve distinction. The Portuguese church authorities decided to recruit Gauddo and Sudir converts into the priesthood, to offset the increasing hostilities of the Bamonn and Chardo clerics. The church authorities initially used these native priests as Konkani interpreters in their parishes and missions.

== Discrimination against native Christians ==
Since the 1510 conquest, the Portuguese had been intermarrying with the natives and created a Mestiço class in Goa that followed Portuguese culture. The Portuguese also desired a similar complete integration of the native Christians into Portuguese culture. The retention of the caste system and Hindu customs by the converts was contemptuously looked down upon by the Portuguese, who desired complete assimilation of the native Christians into their own culture.

Some Portuguese clergy bore racial prejudices against their Goan counterparts. In their letters, they made frequent references to the fact that the native clergy were dark skinned, and that the parishioners had no respect for them as a result. The Franciscan parish priest of Colvale Church, Frei António de Encarnação, excommunicated for striking a Goan assistant, wrote a bitter and virulent essay against the native clergy wherein he called them ' negros chamados curas ' (Portuguese: blacks called curates) and termed them as 'perverse' and 'insolent'. The Franciscans further expanded on the viceregal decree of 1606 regarding making the natives literate in Portuguese to qualify for the priesthood. However, the Archbishop of Goa Ignacio de Santa Theresa is known to have respected the native Goan clerics more than the Portuguese ones, whom he considered to be insolent and overbearing.

== Re-conversion of Gaudas ==
In the late 1920s in what was Portuguese Goa and Daman, some prominent Hindu Goan Brahmins requested the Vinayak Maharaj Masurkar, a guru of an ashram in Masur, Satara district of British Bombay (present-day Maharashtra); to actively campaign for the 're-conversion' of Catholic Gauda and Kunbis to Vaishnavite Hinduism. Masurkar accepted, and together with his disciples, subsequently toured Gauda villages singing devotional bhakti songs and performing pujas. These means led a considerable number of Catholic Gaudas to declare willingness to come into the Hindu fold, and a Shuddhi ceremony was carefully prepared. Their efforts was met with success when on 23 February 1928, many Catholic Gaudas were converted en masse to Hinduism in a Shuddhi ceremony, notwithstanding the vehement opposition of the Roman Catholic Church and the Portuguese authorities. As part of their new religious identity, the converts were given Hindu names. However, the Portuguese government refused to grant them legal permission to change their names. Around 4,851 Catholic Gaudas from Tiswadi, 2,174 from Ponda, 250 from Bicholim and 329 from Sattari became Hindus in this ceremony. The total number of Gauda converts was 7,815. The existing Hindu Gauda community refused to accept these neo-Hindus back into their fold because their Catholic ancestors had not maintained caste purity, and the neo-Hindus were now alienated by their former Catholic coreligionists. These neo-Hindus developed into a separate endogamous community, and are now referred to as Nav-Hindu Gaudas (New Hindu Gaudas).

== Current status of Christianity ==
According to the 1909 statistics in the Catholic Encyclopedia, the total Catholic population in Portuguese controlled Goa was 293,628 out of a total population of 365,291 (80.33%). Since 20th century, the percentage of the Christian population of Goa has been facing continual decline although the number of Christians has increased. This is caused by a combination of constant emigration of Christian Goans from Goa to cosmopolitan Indian cities and foreign countries (e.g. Portugal, United Kingdom) along with the mass immigration of non-Christians from the rest of India since the Annexation of Goa by India. (Ethnic Goans represent less than 50% of the state's residents.) Currently, Christians constitute 366,130 of the total population of 1,458,545 in Goa (25.10%) according to the 2011 census.

== See also ==
- Pre-Portuguese Christianity in Goa
- Christianity in Goa
- Christianity in India
- Conspiracy of the Pintos
- Cuncolim Massacre
- Goa Inquisition
- Sackings of Goa and Bombay-Bassein
- Violence against Christians in India
