= Bhandari Militia =

Bhandari Militia was the first police establishment in Mumbai (then Bombay) during the time of British East India Company. In Bombay, Governor Aungier formed a militia of local Bhandari youth to deal with organized street-level gangs that robbed sailors in 1669. In those days the Bhandaris were referred as Bandareens.

== See also ==
- History of Bombay under British rule
