= Karwari Catholics =

Roman Rite ethno-religious Christians in south-western India

Karwarchem Katholika

Regions with significant populations
- Karwar township and North Kanara district

Languages
- Konkani

Religion
- Christianity (Latin Catholicism)

Related ethnic groups
- Goan Catholics, Kudali Catholics, Mangalorean Catholics, Bombay East Indian Catholics & Damanese Catholics

Karwari Catholics (Konkani: Karwarchem Katholika) are Indian Christians following the Roman Rite of the Catholic Church, primarily from the Karwar township and also the North Kanara district, situated in the Kanara subregion of Karnataka, India. Colloquially called "Karwar district", this area falls under the jurisdiction of the Diocese of Karwar. At the turn of the new century, the diocese had about 50,000 Catholics, comprising 3% of the total population of the district. They are Konkani people and speak the Karwari dialect of the Konkani language. Karwari Catholics share ancestry with Goan Christians and other Christians of the Konkan region and the Konknni language.
