= Daivadnya =

Hindu caste

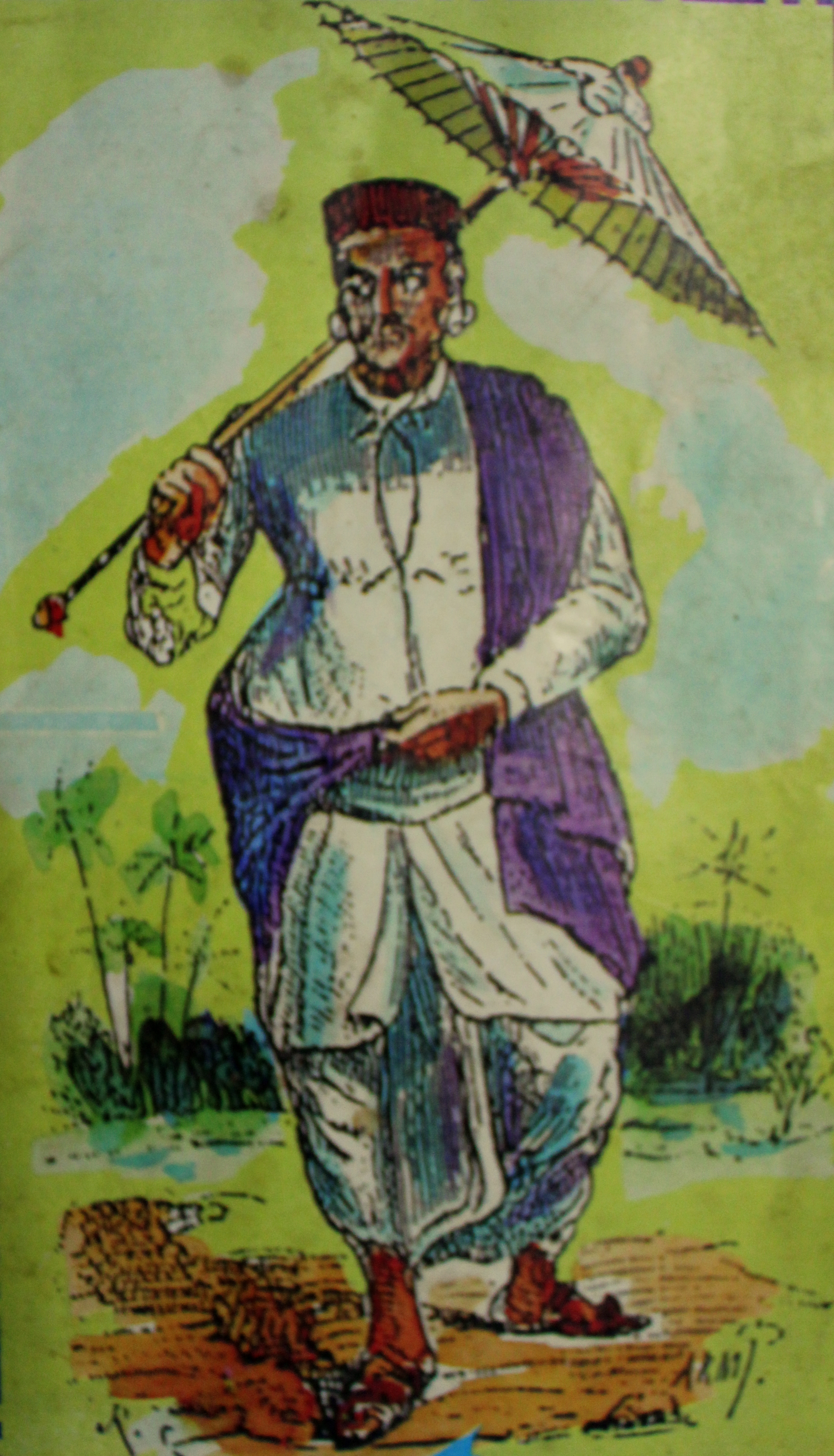
- Shet gentlemen from Goa, from late 18th to early 19th century (Courtesy: Gomant Kalika, Nutan Samvatsar Visheshank, April 2002)

Regions with significant populations
- Goa, Coastal and west Maharashtra, Coastal Karnataka and Kerala.

Languages
- Konkani (majority), Marathi, Tulu and Kannada.

Religion
- Hinduism, Christianity

The Daivadnya, (also known as Sonar or Panchal or Vishwa Brahmin), is a community from Goa and Karnataka, who claim to have descended from Vishwakarma. Although they claim themselves to be Brahmin, but these claims are not accepted by Brahmins. They are native to the Konkan and are mainly found in the states of Goa and Damaon, Canara (coastal Karnataka), coastal Maharashtra, and Kerala. Daivadnyas in the state of Karnataka are classified by National Commission for Backward Classes as an Other Backward Class.

Daivadnya Sonars in Maharashtra claim to be Brahmins and call themselves as Daivadnya Brahmins however this is not accepted by Brahmin communities of Maharashtra. The Poona government of the Peshwa era did not accept the claim either but the Bombay Sonars continued with the claim. However, Oliver Godsmark, a researcher on late colonial and early postcolonial South Asia, considers them a subcaste of the Brahmins that were originally from the coastal regions of Maharashtra, Karnataka and Goa. They are popularly known in Goa as Shets. This word is derived from the word Shrestha or Shresthin

== Names ==
Their name has many alternative spellings, including Daivajna, Daivajnya, Daiwadnya, and Daivadnea.

Daivadnyas are commonly known as Shet. This appellation comes from their guild organisations, during the medieval ages. European documents mentions them as "Chatim" or "Xette", which is corruption of Konkani Shett, or Shetty. The guild or members of the guilds of traders, merchants, and their employees who were mainly artisans, craftsmen, and husband-men in ancient Goa like elsewhere in ancient India, were called Shreni, and the head of the guilds were called Shrestha or Shresthi, which meant His Excellency. Of all the trade guilds, the Daivadnya guild, was highly esteemed in Goa. These guilds enjoyed such a reputation for trustworthiness that people deposited money with these guilds, which served as local banks and also made huge donations to the temples. Gomantak Prakruti ani Sanskruti, a comprehensive work on Goan culture also suggests that they called themselves Sreshtha to distinguish themselves from other groups who were assigned status of Sankra jati or mixed origin in the Shastras.

Old Portuguese documents mention them as Arie Brahmavranda Daivadnea class (Orgon Somudai).

== Traditional history ==
Though their history is obscure, Daivadnyas claim to have descended from Davidnya or Vishvadnya the younger son of Vishwakarma, the Hindu architect god. Shets or Daivadnyas also claim Brahmin varna status, however, this is not accepted by local Brahmins and other communities of the region. There is also a claim that Daivdnyas are descent from the Vedic Rathakara as mentioned in Taittiriya Brahmana of Yajurveda, and Smritis, however Daivadnya community deny this. Hindu doctrines Hiraṇyakeśisutra, Bṛhajjātiviveka, Jātiviveka, Saṅkha smṛti, and Añjabila mention different types of Rathakaras. Most of them can be called Saṅkara Jāti or mixed caste, and their social status varies from those with high social status, who are ritually pure and have the right to perform "strata-smarta" rituals and to those considered fallen or degraded. Daivadnyas (during the conflicts that arose in the 19th century) refuted this claim, which called them Rathakaras of impure descent, on the basis of Shastra

=== Medieval and modern history ===
==== Migrations ====
Author Vithal Raghavendra Mitragotri says, The Bhojas are well-known sculptures and have migrated to various regions of India. Therefore, the Sthapatis who themselves claim to be Brahmins may have been descendants of Bhojas. The gold-smiths claim themselves to be Daivadnya Brahmins. According to Viṭhṭhala Mitragotrī, the migration to Goa dates back to the early 4th to 6th century CE, with the Bhoja dynasty. Bā. Da. Sātoskār in his encyclopedic work on Goan culture, suggests that they are a part of the tribe and reached Goa around 700 BC. From 1352 to 1366 AD Goa was ruled by Khiljī.In 1472, the Bahāmanī Muslims attacked, demolished many temples, and forced the Hindus to convert to Islam. To avoid this religious persecution, several Śeṭ families fled to the neighbourhood kingdom of Sondā. Several families from western India had settled down in Kashi since the late 13th century.

In 1510 the Portuguese invaded Goa. King John III of Portugal issued a decree threatening expulsion or execution of non-believers in Christianity in 1559 AD; the Daivadnyas refused conversion and had to decamp. Thousands of Daivadnya families fled to the interior of Maharashtra and coastal Karnataka. About 12,000 families from the Sāsaṣṭī region of Goa (from Raia, Cuncolim, Loutolim, Verṇa and other places), mostly of the Śeṇavīs and the Shetṭs, including Vaishya Vani, Kudumbi, and others, departed by ship to the southern ports of Honnāvara to Kozhikode. A considerable number of the Sheṭts from Goa settled in Ratnagiri and the Thane district of Maharashtra, especially the Tansa River valley, after the Portuguese conquest of Goa.

==== Portuguese period ====
===== Daivajnas and Christianity =====
The Portuguese imposed heavy restrictions on all Goan Hindus, but the Shetṭs were granted exemption from certain obligations or liabilities. It is rare to find a Christian Goan Shetṭ, while all the other castes find some representation in the convert society; this is because the economic power the Śeṭs wielded in the sixteenth century enabled them to live and work in Goa on their own terms or emigrate with their religion intact. Their commercial knowledge and skills were held in high esteem by the Portuguese; because of the protection the Portuguese gave them, they had a little religious freedom. For example, they were permitted to wear the horizontal Vibhutī caste-mark on the forehead, and were even exempted from punishment when they committed crimes. The very few who converted were assigned the caste of Bamonn among the Goan Catholics. According to the gazetteer of Goa state they are called Catholic Śeṭs, but no such distinction is found amongst Goan Catholics. A detailed study of Comunidades^{[h]} shows that Whether Hindu or Catholic, the community always enjoyed their social status, and were permitted to remain in Christianised parts of Goa, provided they kept a low profile, observed certain disciplines, and paid a tax of three xeraphims of (gold mohor) annually to the Portuguese.

A few Daivadnya families who converted to Catholicism migrated to Mangalore due to attacks by the Marathas in Goa during the late 17th and early 18th century.

===== Relationships with other communities =====
The trade in Goa was mainly in the hands of three communities classes, being the Gaud Saraswat Brahmins, the Vanis and the Sets.

Conflict between Daivadnyas and Vaishyas, in 1348 in Khaṇḍepar or Khaṭegrama, is mentioned in Khaṇḍepar copperplate. This issue was solved in Gaṇanātha temple in Khāṇḍepār, its antecedents are not known. Another conflict in the 17th century, between Shenvi Brahmins and Shets of Goa, these over social status was evidenced in arguments about use of traditional emblems like Suryapan, parasol etc. during religious rituals, functions and festivals. The hatred was so severe until the 19th century that only fear of the police kept the peace. Later, the Portuguese banned the use of Hindu symbols and wedding festival processions.

==== Diaspora ====
Documents mention a Gramanya^{[j]} that lasted from 1822 to 1825, between the Daivadnyas and the Brahmins of Pune or the Puna Joshis. This dispute started because the Puna Joshis were against Daivadnyas employing their own priests and not employing the Vyavahare Joshis for their religious functions. These Daivadnya families had migrated from Ratnagiri, to Pune during the reign of Baji Rao I, who always upheld their claims against the Vyavahare Brahmans or the Puna Joshis. The opponent Brahmins were against the Daivadnyas administering Vedokta Karmas or Vedic rituals, studying and teaching Vedas, wearing dhoti, folding hands in Namaskar. They urged the Peshwas, and later, the British to impose legal sanctions, such as heavy fines to implement non-observance of Vedokta Karmas, though the later had been always observing the Vedic rites. The Joshis denied their Brahmin claim, allegedly argued that they are not even entitled to Upabrāhmaṇa status which are mentioned in the Śaivāgama. Thus they claimed that latter were not entitled to Vedokta Karmas and should follow only Puraṇokta rites and they were also against the Brahmins who performed Vedic rituals for the Daivadnyas, they incriminated that Daivadnyas have an impurity of descent and have a mixed-caste status or Saṅkara Jāti. The British also issued orders to the Daivadnyas by which the Vedas not be applied for an improper purpose, the purity of the Brahmin caste be preserved and did not impose any restrictions on the Daivadnyas. This dispute almost took a pro-Daivadnya stance in Bombay in 1834, and were ordered to appoint the priests of only their own Jāti and not priests of any other caste as per the tradition. It is during these disputes Daivadnya Pundits came up with extensive literature like versions of Sahyadrikhanda of Skandapurana, to clear their maligned image by the Pune Brahmins.

In 1849, the king of Kolhapur, Shahu Maharaj, provided land grants to the Daivadnyas who had migrated to princely states of Kolhapur and Satara and helped them build their hostels for the students pursuing education.

Many families like the Murkuṭes, the Paṭaṇkars, the Seṭs of Karvara and Bhaṭkala kept their tradition alive and excelled in trade, playing a major role in socio-cultural development of the major metropolis of India such as Bombay.

The Daivadnya priests who officiated at the Gokarṇa Mahabaleswara temple were prosecuted in 1927 by the Havyakas of Gokarṇa, who thought they would take over the puja authority at the temple. The case reached the Bombay High Court, which ruled in favour of the Seṭs.

==== Modern period ====
Some Goan Daivadnya families migrated to Pune and overseas. The Akhīla Bharatiya Daivajña Samajonnati Pariṣat has existed since 1908 for their betterment.

Similarly, about 3500 Sheṭts migrated to Bangalore city after 1905 from South Canara. Many families have migrated to Mumbai and have founded organisations such as the Kanara Daivajna Association, and Daivajna Shikṣṇa Maṇḍala. The Shimoga, Chikkamagaluru, Koḍagu, Davangere, and Hubli-Dharwad districts of Karnataka now have a considerable Daivadnya population.

Shetṭs have also migrated abroad. They are found in the Arab countries and have been migrating overseas in pursuit of higher education and employment for number of years, notably to the US and UK. A small number have Portuguese or Kenyan citizenship, and a few live in Karachi, Lahore Pakistan, but most of them have settled as refugees in Ulhasnagar after partition.

== Religion ==
Their earliest religious beliefs could have been based on a mixture of Brahmanism, Bhagavata religion, sun worship and Shaivism, though it cannot be ascertained to a particular period of time or geographical region. Different schools of Shaivism have existed in Goa and Konkan since ancient times. Similarly, Shaivism was very popular amongst Goans of all walks of life, and was very widely practiced. Their religious and cultural beliefs were constantly influenced by other religions such as Jainism, Buddhism and later the Nath sect when the ruling dynasties patronised them. Up to 1476 there was no proper Vaishnavism in Goa, but later under influence of Madhvacharya many of them embraced Madhwa philosophy.

=== Deities ===
Daivadnyas are followers of Madhvacharya and Adi Shankara. The followers of Adi Shankara worship deities as prescribed by him as Panchayatana puja – a concept of worshipping God in any of the five forms, namely Shiva, Devi, Ganesha, Vishnu and Surya, that was propagated by Adi Shankara (8th century) is observed by Daivadnyas today. Daivadnyas worship the Pancayatana deities with Devi or Shiva as the principle deity. A possible Pancayatana set may be: Shantadurga, Shiva, Lakshminarayan (Vishnu with his consort Lakshmi), Ganesha and Surya. Pancayatana may also include guardian deities like Vetala, Ravalnath, Bhutanath, Kala-Bhairava, Kshetrapala and deities like Gramapurusha.

Daivadnyas who follow the Vaishnavism of Madhvacharya worship Vishnu and Lakshmi as their prime deities and have established many temples of Vishnu in the form of Lakshminarayan, Krishna, Venkatesha, Narasimha and Vithoba. They were converted into Madhva fold by Vadiraja Tirtha and they are followers of Sodhe Matha, one of Ashta Mathas of Udupi.

==== Kuladevatas ====
Their tutelary deities are primarily in the form of the Mother Goddess, though they revere all Vedic, Puranic and folk deities equally.

==== Ishtadevata ====
Ishta-devata is a term denoting a worshipper's favourite deity. Ganesha is ishta-devata of all the Śeṭs. Ganesh Chaturthi or Siddhivināyaka Vrata is a major festival of the Daivadnyas.

Kalika, Kansarpal, Goa – is worshipped as Ishta-devata by Gomantaka Daivajñas. This temple is more than 800 years old and is located at a distance of around 14 kilometres from Mapusa. It was built by Kadambas and was renovated by a Daivadnya minister who was serving Sawant Bhonsale – kings of Sawantwadi, Maharashtra. It is one of the most important temples in the northern part of Goa. The main festivals celebrated in this temple are Śiśirotsava, Navrātrī, Rathasaptamī, Āvalībhojana and Vasantapujā.

Other Ishta-devata of Daivadnyas include Rama, Dattatreya Hanuman, Vithoba of Pandharpur, Hayagriva of Udupi, Mahalakshmi, Krishna, Gayatri, Durgā Parameśvarī, Lakshmi-narayan, Mañjunātha of Dharmasthala and Gokarṇa Mahābaleśvara. Daivadnyas maintain several temples in Goa, and about 38 temples in North Canara district of Kanarataka, and many temples in other parts of Karantaka, Maharashtra and few in the state of Kerala.

Daivajñas also honour various saints like Sathya Sai Baba, Dada Maharaj of Patgaon, Raghavendra Swami, Narasimha Saraswati, Swami Samarth Maharaj, Sai Baba of Shirdi, Shreedhar Swami, Mata Amritanandamayi and Maṅkipura Svāmī.

=== Maṭha tradition and Saṃpradāyas ===
==== Shankara or Smarta sect ====
- Shets of Goa, Maharashtra and some parts of Karnataka follow the religious rules of the Smritis and are thus called Smarta, i.e. the followers of the Smṛitis. They were followers of Sringeri Sharada Peetha
- Due to some unavoidable conflicts between the two sects in the community a new maṭha was established in Sri Kshetra Karki, Honnāvara, in North Canara district. The maṭha is called Jnaneshwari Peeth.

==== Vaishnava or Madhva sect ====
- The Daivadnya diaspora in North Canara, Udupi, South Canara and Kerala, who had migrated from Goa due to Arab and Portuguese invasions, were influenced by Vadiraja and adopted Vaishnavism. History says that a Daivajña named Gopalashetṭi was sculpting a Gaṇesha idol, but it took form of a horse or Hayagriva. He offered it to Vadiraja, the pontiff of Sode maṭha, who later expanded his sphere of influence by taking all the Daivadnyas of north Canara into the fold of his Vaishnavism by extending to them dikṣa and mudra.

== Classification ==
=== Subdivisions ===
Śeṭs were divided according to the place from where they hailed, the maṭha they followed and other criteria.

==== The Subdivisions of Gomantaka Daivajñas ====
Until the early 19th century, Goan Śeṭs were divided into three sub-divisions based on their geographical location, but these divisions no longer exist:

- Vāḍkār (from Peḍṇe, Sattarī, Divcal)
- Goyṃkār (from Sāsaṣṭi, Mūrgānv, Tisvāḍī, Bārdes)
- Sauṃdekār (from Phoṇḍā, Kāṇkoṇ, Sāṅge, Kepe)

These sub-divisions never intermarried nor did they accept food from their counterparts.

==== Diaspora in Maharashtra ====
There are no prominent distinctions found in Maharashtra, but there are mentions of groups of Śeṭs of Goa, especially from Sāsaṣṭī, Bārdes, Tīsvāḍī, landing in places like Ṭhāṇe, Sāvantvāḍī, Ratnagiri, Khārepāṭaṇ, Mālvaṇ, Kudāl etc. Daivajñas from Koṅkaṇa later migrated elsewhere in Maharashtra, and hence they were also known as Koṅkaṇe or Konkane Devajnas as mentioned in old documents.

Previously, Daivajñas from Goa refrained from having matrimonial alliances outside Goa. Today they arrange them with the Daivajñas of Karnataka and Maharashtra.

==== Shetṭs of Kerala ====
The emigration of Goan Shetṭs to Kerala dates from the early 13th century, when most of them settled in the port of Cochin. Some Shets migrated from Goa during the later half of the 16th century due to the religious persecution of the Portuguese. These people settled in places such as Quilon, Trichur, Kozhikode, and Kasaragod, along the coast of Kerala.

The Keralite Shets have a temple dedicated to Gopalakrishna, which is perhaps the oldest temple in Fort Cochin.

== Society and culture ==
=== Language ===
Daivadnyas speak Koṅkaṇi and its dialects. Gomantaka Daivadnyas speak a dialect of Koṅkaṇi known as Goan Koṅkaṇi which the Ethnologue recognises as the Gomāntakī dialect, further divided into sub-dialects such as the Bārdescī Bhās or north Goan, Pramāṇa or standard Koṅkaṇī and Sāśṭicī Bhās or south Goan. Their Konkani sociolect is different from others and is more closer to the Saraswat dialect.

Daivadnyas in Maharashtra, i.e. Mumbai, Ṭhane, Pune, Kolhapura, Satara, contemporarily speak Maraṭhi. In the Koṅkaṇa region of Maharashtra they speak dialects of Koṅkaṇi such as Malvani, Kudali and others. Daivadnyas in Kanara speak different dialects of Koṅkaṇi, such as Karvari in the Uttara Kannada district and Maṅgluri in the South Canara district.

Almost all of them are bilingual, Goan seṭs can speak Maraṭhi fluently, Canara Seṭs speak Kannaḍa and Tulu outside home, likewise a very small fraction of Keralites can speak Malayalaṃ with an accent, most of them can speak English fluently. Many of them have accepted Maraṭhi/Kannaḍa as their cultural language but noticeably, this has not led to an assimilation of these languages with Koṅkaṇi. Similarly Daivadnyas settled in various parts of Gujarat use the local Gujarati language. Portuguese language is known by many members of older generation of Goans who had done their formal education during the Portuguese rule.

Historians say that the period of migration of Daivajñas and the Kudāldeskārs, from the northern part of India is same, and they settled in Goa in the same period, for this reason members of both the communities speak the same dialect of Koṅkaṇī in Goa.

Historically, many scripts have been used writing either Koṅkaṇī or Marāṭhī. An extinct script called as Goykanadi^{[i]} was used by the traders in the early 16th century. The earliest document written in this script is a petition addressed by Ravala Śeṭī to the king of Portugal. Other scripts used include Devanāgarī, Moḍī, Halekannaḍa and Roman script.

==== Kali Bhasha secret lexicon ====
Daivajña traders had developed a unique slang called Kalī Bhās, which was used to keep the secrecy of the trade by the traders. Remnants of this jargon are still found in the language used by the Daivajña traders.

=== Diet ===
The Daivadnyas are generally non-vegetarians and eat fish, mutton and chicken, but abstain from eating beef, pork and buffalo meat. Rice with fish curry is their main food.

=== Ceremonies and rituals ===
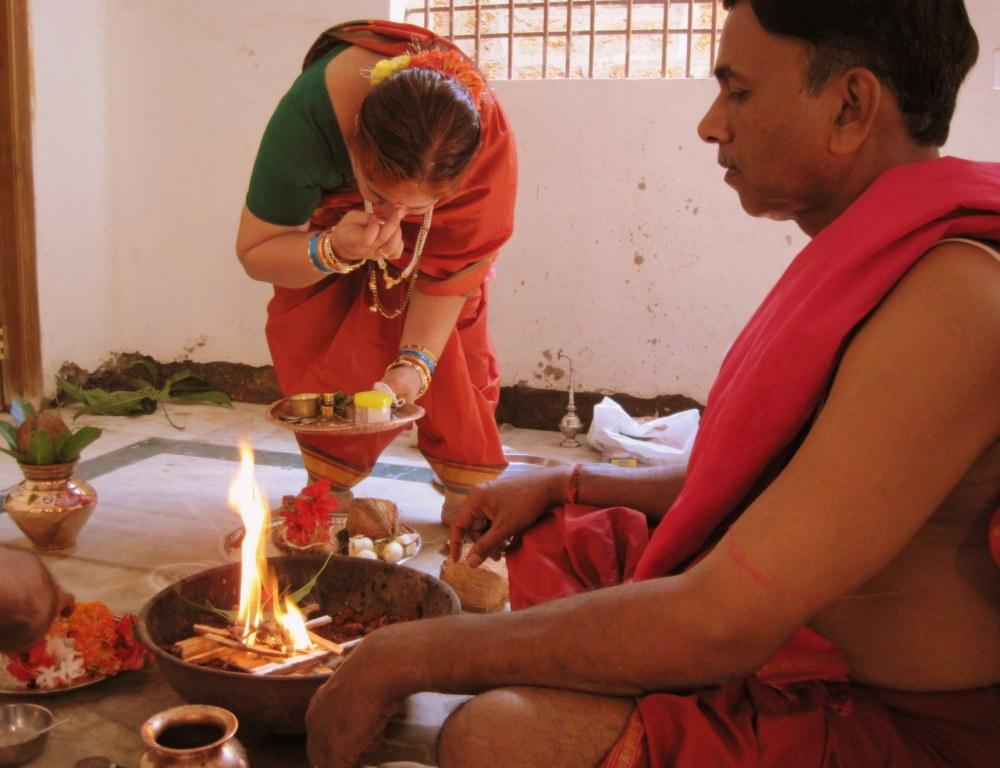
A couple performing religious rituals

Konkani people in general though speak Indo-Aryan languages follow Dravidian kinship practices (see Karve, 1965: 25 endnote 3). One's father's brother's children as well as mother's sister's children are considered as brothers and sisters, whereas mother's brother's children and father's sisters children are considered as cousins and potential mates. Cross-cousin marriages are allowed and practised. Like dravidian people, they refer to their father's sister as mother-in-law or atte, and their mother's brother as father-in-law – mama, and one's husband's mother is generally referred to as mother-maay.

Daivadnya people are not so orthodox but they strictly adhere to all the Ṣoḍaśa Saṃskāra or the 16 sacraments, and other Brahminical rituals according to the Rig Veda. The Saṃskāras begin to be observed right from the day of conception, but the prenatal sacraments like Garbhadhāna, Puṃsavana, are usually performed as a part of the wedding ceremony nowadays, unlike some 30 years ago these sacraments were held separately after the wedding ceremony at the right time.

Usually the birth of the first child is supposed to take place in woman's mother's home. After the child is born, ten days of birth pollution or Suyer is observed, by keeping an oil lamp lit for ten days. On the sixth day following childbirth, the goddess Śaṣṭī is worshipped. On the 11th day, a purification Homa is performed. The Nāmakaraṇa or the Bārso, a naming ceremony, is performed on the 12th day. It is sometimes held one month following the child birth if the stars are not favourable. The Karṇavedha or Kān topap ceremony is held on the 12th day in case of a male child, or for a female child, it is held a month after the birth. For Uśṭāvaṇ, Annaprasana or the first feeding ceremony child's maternal uncle feeds the baby with cooked soft rice mixed with milk and sugar. Another similar ritual, Dāntolyo is also performed by the maternal uncle when the baby gets new teeth, on the first birthday of the child. Ceremonies like the first outing or Niṣkrāmaṇa, Jāval or cūdākarṃa i.e. cutting child's hair for first time, Vidyāraṃbha or commencement of studies, are performed as per caste rules.

When the boys grow up, and before they attain the age of 12, Munj or Upanayana is performed with great fanfare. All other sacraments related to it, like Keśānta or the first shave, Vedarambha or, Samāvartana or Soḍ Munj are performed as a part of thread ceremony nowadays. In case of girls(who were always married before attaining puberty some 75–100 years ago), a ceremony associated with a girl's first menstruation was observed in olden days.

The most important sacrament for them is Vivāha, Lagna or the wedding. Various ceremonies held before the actual wedding ceremony are Sākarpuḍo or the betrothal, Devkāre or Devkārya that includes Puṇyāhvācana, Nāndi, Halad, Tel, Uḍid muhurtaSome of their customs are different from any others castes. etc. The actual wedding ceremony is performed as per Ṛgveda.Sīmāntapujā, Kanyādāna, Kaṅkaṇa-bandhana, Maṅgalasutra-bandhana, Saptapadi, Lājahoma, Aṣmārohaṇa, Vāyanadāna form the actual parts of the wedding ceremony. Ceremonies like Gṛhapraveśa, changing the maiden name of the bride, and the puja are followed by some games to be played by the newly wed couple, and the visit to the family deity temple.Pancpartavaṇ or a feast is organised five days after marriage. They strictly observe Gotra exogamy. The custom of dowry in its strict form does not exist any more, but Sālaṅkṛta Kanyādāna with Varadakṣiṇā is followed as a custom. Intercaste marriages are not common in Daivajñas

A widower is and was allowed to remarry but traditionally this was not the case for widows. In more recent times, post-independence of India, social reforms have allowed widows to remarry but the practice is still frowned upon by the society. The age for girls for marriage is from 18 to 25 and that for boys is from 25 to 30. Child marriage is absent though girls were married off before attaining puberty, this custom was prevalent till the 19th century.

Their dead are cremated according to the vedic rights, and various Śhrāddhas श्राद्ध and other Kriyās, Tarpaṇas are performed by the son or any other paternal relative, or in some cases by the son-in-law of the deceased. As per the Vedas, dead infants without teeth must not be cremated, and are supposed to be buried. The body is generally carried to the cremation ground by the son of the deceased and his/her close relatives. Death pollution or Sutaka usually lasts for twelve days. They usually own their own cremation grounds. Women are not allowed in the crematorium. If the deceased was male, his widow was tonsured and strict restrictions were imposed on widows. There was no custom of widow remarriage in the past neither is it very common nowadays nor was there any custom of divorce.

Their priests are usually from their own caste otherwise, particularly Karhade priests officiate their ceremonies whom they show much reverence.

=== Festivals ===
Daivajñas observe all the Hindu festivals but Ganesh Chaturthi, Nag Panchami and Diwali are the most important annual festivals. Other festivals and Vratas observed by them are — Saṃvatsarāraṃbha, Saṃvatsar Pāḍvo or Yugādi, Vaṭa Paurṇimā, Vadāpunav, Ṛk Śrāvaṇi, Sūtāpunav, Gokulashtami, Āditya pujan, Āytārā puja, Haritālikā Tṛtiyā, Tay or Tayī, Navratri, Lalita Panchami, Dasaro, Āvatāñcī pujā, Bhaubeej, Tulaśī Lagna, Ekadashis like Āṣādhī, Kārtikī, Mālinī Paurṇimā or Mānnī Punav, Makar Sankranti, Shigmo, Holi, Mahashivratri, Veṅkaṭapatī Samarādhanā'

=== Dressing style ===
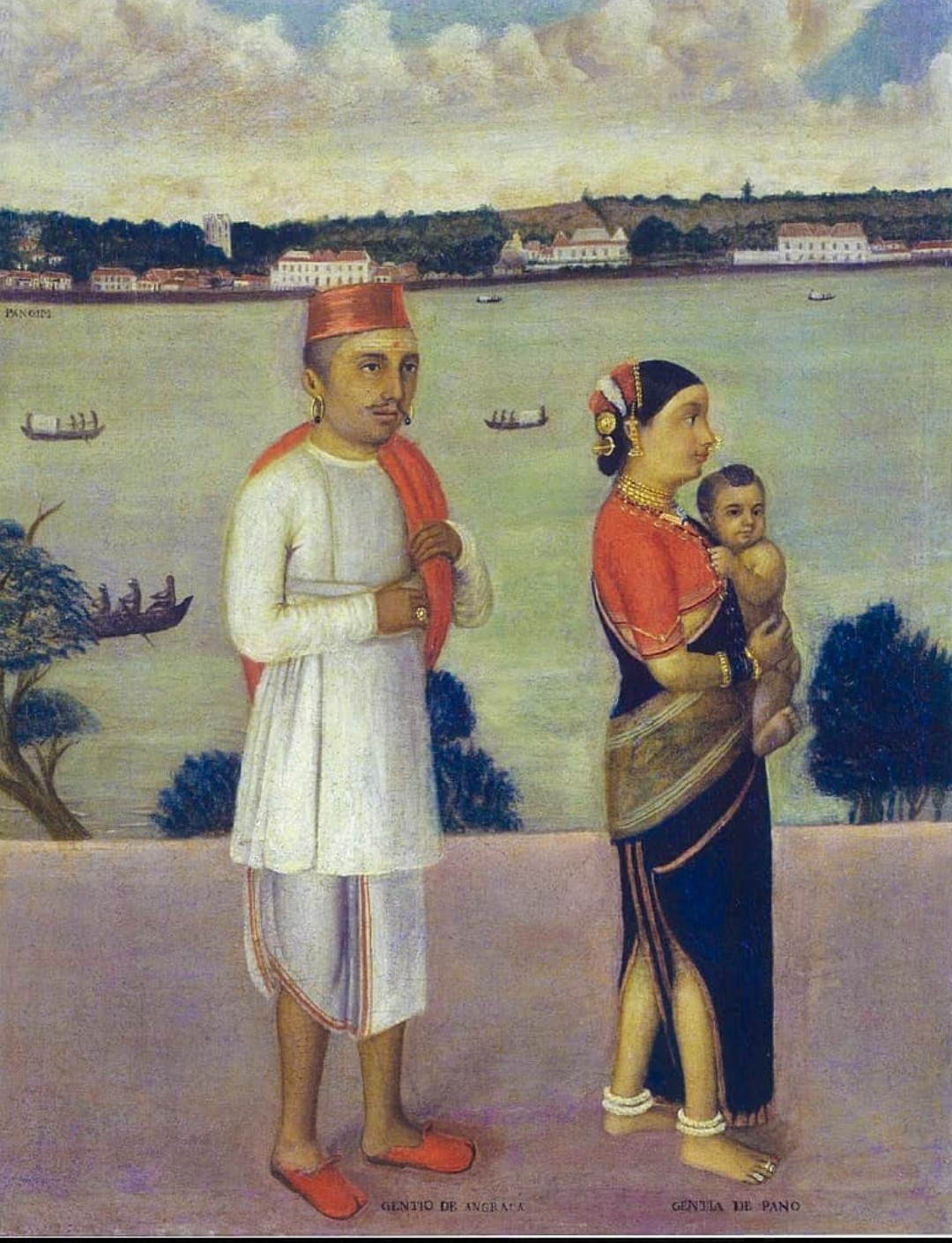
A Daivajna couple from Goa, late 18th century

Daivajña men traditionally wear Dhotīs called Puḍve or Aṅgavastra, which cover them from waist to foot. These are made of cotton and sometimes silk on special occasions and wore Judi or Sadro to cover upper part of their bodies, and a piece of cloth called Uparṇe over the shoulders. They wore turbans and Pagdis, Muṇḍāso, a red velvet cap or Topī was used by the traders and merchants so that they would not be troubled by the Portuguese. Men had their ears pierced and wore Bhikbālī, sported Śendī and wore Vibhutī or Sandalwood or Gopīcandana paste on their foreheads. Men were fond of gold jewellery, too.

Traditional Daivajña woman wear a nine-yard saree, also known as Kāppad or Cīre in such a way that the back was fully covered. The fashion of wearing a blouse became popular in the 18th century. Ghāgro and a five yards saree was worn by unmarried girls. Women wore gold ornaments on different parts of their bodies (e.g. Ghonṭ, Pāṭlī, Todo, Bājunband, Galesarī, Valesar, Kudī), and wore silver ornaments to decorate their feet (e.g.;Paijaṇ, Salle, Māsolī, Vāle).

=== Socio-economic background ===
The traditional occupation of Daivajña people is the jewellery trade. Why this became their occupation is not known. There are no mentions of the Śeṭs practising this occupation in the early history, although they used to make gold and silver images for the temples, which old texts suggest they have inherited this art from the Bhojaks who made idols of the Sun god, hence were also called as Murtikāras. They were well versed in Śilpaśāstra and in Sanskrit hence received royal patronage. Dhume mentions that the Śeṭs also studied medicine, astrology, astronomy in ancient university of Brahmapuri in Goa.

They were renowned for their skills even in the western world and were the first to introduce exquisite jewellery designs to Europe, and were extensively involved in gold, silver, perfumes, black pepper export and even silk, cotton textiles, tobacco and import of horses during Portuguese and pre-Portuguese era. Texts maintain names of many wealthy traders e.g. Virūpa Śeṭī of Coḍaṇe,Āditya Śeṭī of Śivāpura or Śirodā Viṭhṭhala Śeṭī, Dama Śeṭī, who was appointed as an administrator of the Bhatkaṭa port by the Portuguese, and others. Ravala Śeṭī from Caraim who was summoned to Lisbon by the king of Portugal, was a collaborator with Afonso de Albuquerque and retained a high office in Goa. Since days of yore their business has been flourishing on the banks of river Mandovi, historical records mention them as prosperous and wealthy traders and business class. These traders, merchants with their fellow artisans, craftsmen had organised themselves into Śreṇīs or guilds, Śreṣṭhīs or the head of the guilds were very wealthy, and made huge donations to the temples, and their guilds also served as local banks and treasuries.

Few of them also worked as interpreters in king's court and were called Dubash, Gaṇa Śeṭī from Loutolim village was in Kadamba rajas court. From the old documents it can be also seen that few of them were involved in politics, and were employed by the kings for their service. Some of them were even associated with salvage operation of the vessels, and sometimes even provided the Portuguese with troops, ships and crew.

They assisted the kings in minting and designing the coins; during Maratha rule some Daivadnya families were given a title of Potdar, which literally means treasurer in Persian, who were in charge of testing the genuineness of the minted coins and their prescribed weight, and played an important role in the revenue system of the Marāṭhas.

The tradition of studying Vedas amongst the Goan Śeṭs does not exist any more, but Daivadnyas from Gokarṇa, Honnavara and many other places in coastal Karnataka and Koṅkaṇa division of Maharashtra have kept this tradition alive. Many of them are priests who offer religious services to the community, very few of them are astrologers and temple priests.

Along with educationally advanced communities in the 1850s – the CKPS, Pathare Prabhus, Saraswats, Parsis;Daivadnyas were one of the communities in the Bombay Presidency that allowed female education.

Daivadnyas in the state of Karnataka are classified by National Commission for Backward Classes as an Other Backward Class.

== Notable people ==
- Jagannath Shankarseth - philanthropist and educationalist.

== Notes ==
- ... Śrī Mulapuruṣāne Gauḍadeśāhūna devilā āṇūna ticī sthāpanā chudāmaṇī betāvarīl, Kārai hyā jāgī, Gomatī nadīcyā tīrāvar kelī ... (Translation:Mulapuruṣa brought the images of the goddess from the Gauḍadeśa, and installed them in a place called as Kārai on the Chudamani island on the banks of river Gomatī.)
  Source:Smaranika:published by Śrī Gajantalakṣmī Ravalnatha Devasthana Mārsel Goa, May 2004
- A study of Comunidade de Caraim was done by Śrī Gajantalakṣmī Ravalnatha Devasthana. This temple used to exist in Caraim until 1510, and was later shifted to Mahem and then to Mārsel, as mentioned in the documents preserved by the temple and the Comunidade de Caraim documents, all the Gauncars of this comunidade were of Daivadnea bramane Casta, and were divided in three vangors. Most of the Gauncars fled in other places to avoid conversions, no Hindu Gauncars are found in Caraim any more, but only two families of Gauncars of the Comunidade de Caraim are found in Caraim now and they belong to the Roman Catholic Brahmin or Bamonn category. Same is the case with Comunidade de Sangolda, and Comunidade de Aldona.
  Sources:Smaranika:published by Śrī Gajantalakṣmī Ravalnatha Devasthana Mārsel Goa, May 2004
  Ad. Paṇduraṅga Puruṣottama Śiroḍkara (Bharatiya samajavighaṭaka jātivarṇa vyavasthā)
  Goa: Hindu temples and deities, By Rui Gomes Pereira, Antonio Victor Couto Published by Pereira, 1978, p. 41
- ... The earliest instance of this script we have in a petition addressed by a certain Ravala Śeṭī, most probably a Gaunkar of Caraim in the islands of Goa, to the king of Portugal ...
  This signature of Ravala Śeṭī in Koṅkaṇī written in Goykānaḍī:
  Ravala Śeṭī baraha, which means writing of Ravala Śeṭī
  This petition also includes signature of Ravala Śeṭī in Roman script.
  Source:History of Goa through Gõykanadi
- Grāmaṇya is a crystallisation of conflicts between two castes of individuals belonging to the same caste, and the same group, about observance of certain religious practices vis-a-vis other members of the society or of the particular caste group. There are two types of Grāmaṇyas inter-caste, and intra-caste. (Source:The Satara raj, 1818–1848: a study in history, administration, and culture By Sumitra Kulkarni, Pages: 187,188.)
- Sanskrit Suvarṇakāra, is corrupted to Prākṛta Soṇṇāro from which Koṅkaṇī and Marāṭhī word Sonār is derived. (Source: The Koṅkaṇî language and literature By Joseph Gerson Cunha, p. 18.)
