= Mangela Kolis =

Subcaste of Koli caste of Maharashtra

Mangela Koli मांगेळा कोळी
- Surname
- Ethnicity: Koli
- Location: Maharashtra; Goa; Gujarat
- Varna: Ethnic group
- Parent tribe: Koli
- Language: Wadiyara Koli; Parkarai Koli; Kachi Koli; Marathi; Gujarati; Hindi
- Religion: Hindu
- Surnames: Patil; Nayak}

The Mangela, or Mangala is a Koli surname found in the Indian state of Maharashtra.

The Mangelas (Koli) some of them work at Coastal areas for their livelihood.

== History ==
In the year of 1922, the Mangela Kolis were hit by an epidemic of smallpox. They believed this epidemic to have been caused by a goddess who had therefore to be propitiated. Ceremonies were held at which Mangela Koli women became possessed by the deity. Through these mediums she made it known to the community that she would be satisfied only if they gave up meat, fish, liquor and toddy. The propitiation ceremony of the Mangela Kolis and Vaitty Kolis conformed to this pattern. As their spirit-mediums were normally female, women were possessed by the goddess and made her wishes known. One of these wishes was that they abstain from alcoholic drinks and meat. The Koli women who were possessed by goddess known as Salahbai or advising sister because she gave the advice of goddess.

The Mangela Kolis of Gujarat and Maharashtra started Devi movement to rid themselves of bad habits such as the consumption of meat (nonvegetarianism) and liquor.

== Clans ==
Here are some of the prominent clans of Mangela Kolis,

- Mangela
- Pagdhare
- Chaudhari
- Mhatre
- Gharat
- Tandel
- Patil
- Raut
- Hambeere
- Ambhire
- Damankar
- Dhanu
- Marde
- Mandekar
- Vaidya
- Arekar
- Tamore
- Meher
- Dawane
- Keni
- Bhoir
- Akrekar
- Nijap
- Nijai
- Vinde
- Dhanmeher
- Govadkar

== Classification ==
The Mangela Kolis are Koli ethnic group mainly found in Maharashtra, kolis are an historical ethnic group according to anthropologists.
