= Chaukalshi =

Ethnic community of Maharashtra and Goa

Chaukalshi is an ethnic community of Maharashtra and Goa.

They are related to Panchkalshi community. It is a local folk that they are one of the original tribes, who migrated to Bombay in 13th century AD with King Bhimdev. The community is widespread mostly across konkan region from Palghar district to Ratnagiri district in Maharashtra.

Post independence of India, there were some efforts for unification of Chaukalshi & Panchkalshi tribes and a foundation named Kshatriya Parishad was founded in 1949 for the purpose.
