= Kharvi =

Fishing community from the Konkan region of India

Regions with significant populations
- Goa, Maharashtra, Karnataka

Languages
- Konkani, Kannada, Marathi

Religion
- Hinduism

Related ethnic groups
- Konkani people, Marathi people

The Kharvi are a traditional fishing community found along the western coastal regions of India, particularly in the states of Goa, Maharashtra, and Karnataka. The community is historically associated with marine fishing and related occupations along the Konkan coast.

Kharvi communities have traditionally depended on the Arabian Sea for their livelihood. Fishing, fish trading, and other activities connected with the marine economy have long been central to their way of life.

== Traditional occupation ==
Fishing has historically been the principal occupation of the Kharvi community. Many members of the community are involved in catching fish in coastal waters and selling seafood in local markets. Fishing knowledge, boat handling, and navigation skills have traditionally been passed down through generations.

In addition to fishing, the community is also involved in fish processing, drying, and trade. Over time, some members of the community have entered other professions including small businesses, private employment, and government service.

== Subgroups ==
The Kharvi community has various traditional sub-groups including the Taris, Tarukars, and Ramponkars. These groups historically had different roles within the fishing economy, including fishing, boat ownership, and coastal trade.

== Karnataka ==
In Karnataka, the Kharvi community is mainly found in the coastal districts, especially in Uttara Kannada and parts of Udupi. Significant populations are present in coastal towns and villages such as Karwar, Honnavar, Bhatkal, and areas near the Gangavali River.

Smaller communities are also present in nearby taluks including Sirsi, Siddapur, and Yellapur. Traditionally the community has been involved in marine fishing, fish trading, and related coastal occupations.

In recent decades, members of the Kharvi community in Karnataka have diversified into other occupations such as small business, transportation, tourism-related work, and government employment while maintaining cultural ties to fishing traditions.

Kharvis in Karnataka commonly speak Konkani along with Kannada in daily communication.

== Culture ==
The Kharvi community traditionally follows Hinduism. Temples and local religious traditions form an important part of community life in coastal villages. Community festivals and rituals are often connected to the sea, fishing seasons, and local deities.

Food traditions commonly include rice and fish curry along with other seafood dishes typical of the Konkan coastal region.

== See also ==
- Konkani people
- Fishing communities in India
- Konkan

== See also ==
- Konkani language
- Canara konkani
- Koli people
