= Christianity in Goa =

Type of religion in Goa, India

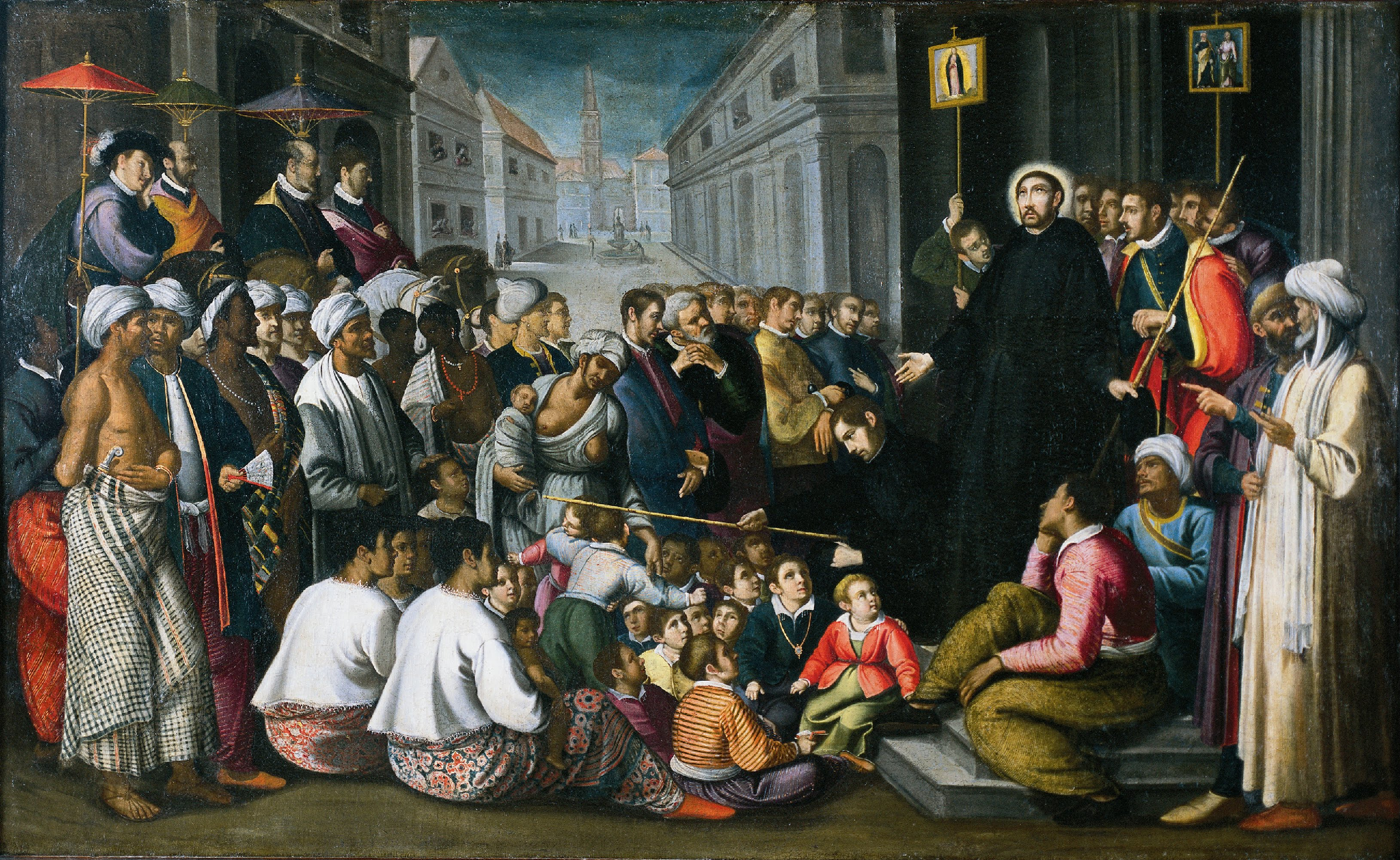

Total population
- 366,130 (2011)▲25.10% ▼

Languages
- Latin (sacred); Roman Konkani (native); Portuguese

The Christian population of Goa consists mostly of Goan Catholics, whose ancestors converted to Catholicism during the Portuguese rule in India. Christianisation followed the Portuguese conquest of Goa in 1510, which was followed by the Goa Inquisition from 1560 onwards. Although Christians make up over 80% of ethnic Goans (293,628 out of a total population 365,291 in 1909), they were less than 27% of Goa's population in 2011 because ethnic Goans are less than 50% of the state's residents. There is a higher proportion of Christians in Velhas Conquistas than in Novas Conquistas.

Christians in Goa
Year	Number	Percentage
2001	359,568	26.68
2011	366,130	25.10

Christianity is the second largest religious grouping of residents in Goa, India. According to the 2011 census, 25% of the resident population are Christian, while 66% are Hindu.

== History ==
=== Portuguese rule ===
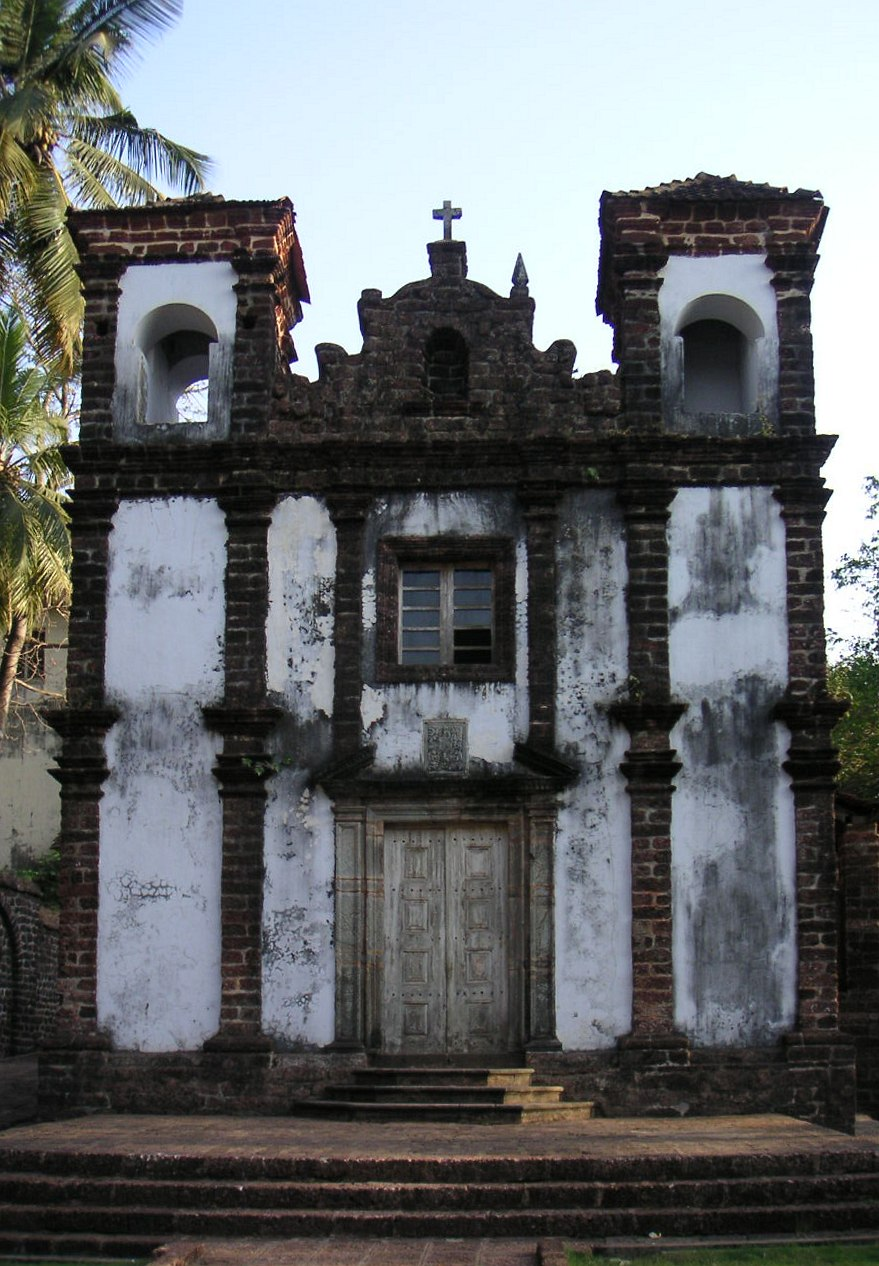
Chapel of St. Catherine, built in Old Goa during Portuguese rule. It should not be confused with the Cathedral of Santa Catarina, also in Old Goa.

After the Portuguese Conquest of Goa in 1510 and its subsequent rule by Portugal, Goa's indigenous population underwent a large-scale conversion to Roman Catholicism. The first converts to Christianity in Goa were native Goan women who married Portuguese men that arrived with Afonso de Albuquerque. The city of Goa became the center of Christianisation in the east.

The evangelisation activities in Goa were divided in 1555 by the Portuguese viceroy of Goa, Pedro Mascarenhas. He allotted Bardez to the Franciscans, Tiswadi to the Dominicans, and Salcette, together with fifteen southeastern villages of Tiswadi, including Chorão and Divar, to the Jesuits.

After conversion, locals were usually granted Portuguese citizenship. The rapid rise of converts in Goa has been described as mostly the result of Portuguese economic and political control over the Hindus, who were vassals of the Portuguese crown.

The process of Christianisation was simultaneously accompanied by "Lusitanisation", as the Christian converts typically assumed a Portuguese veneer. This was most visible by the discarding of old Hindu names for new Christian Portuguese names. Converts usually adopted the surnames of the Portuguese priest, governor, soldier or layman who stood as godfather for their baptism ceremony.

For instance, the Boletim do Instituto Vasco da Gama lists the new names of some of the prominent ganvkars (Konkani: Freeholders): Rama Prabhu, the son of Dado Vithal Prabhu from Benaulim, Salcette became Francisco Fernandes, while Mahabal Pai, the son of Nara Pai, became Manuel Fernandes in 1596. Mahabal Kamati of Curtorim became Aleixo Menezes in 1607, while Chandrappa Naik of Gandaulim became António Dias in 1632. In 1595, Vittu Prabhu became Irmão de Diego Soares and the son of Raulu Kamat became Manuel Pinto in Aldona, Bardez. Ram Kamat of Punola became Duarte Lobo in 1601, while Tados Irmaose of Anjuna became João de Souza in 1658.

However, the converted Hindus retained Konkani as their first language and also an approximation of their original caste status, even after becoming Catholic. Based on their previous caste affiliations, the new converts were usually lumped into their new respective Catholic castes. All converted Brahmins (Saraswat, Daivadnya, etc.) were lumped together into the Christian caste of Bamonn. The converts from the Kshatriya and even some Vaishya Vani castes became Chardos (Konkani word for Kshatriya); remaining Vaishyas became Gauddos; and converts from the Shudra castes as well as the previously Dalit and adivasi groups became Sudirs (Konkani word for Shudra).

The Portuguese also oversaw the destruction of many Hindu temples. The majority of Hindu temples had already been demolished by the Bahmani and Bijapur sultanates by the time the Portuguese arrived in 1510. The Portuguese demolished almost all the remaining temples from the Velhas Conquistas and converted the majority of villagers to Catholicism. The few Hindus wishing to retain their religion relocated with their idols and built temples for them in the Novas Conquistas.

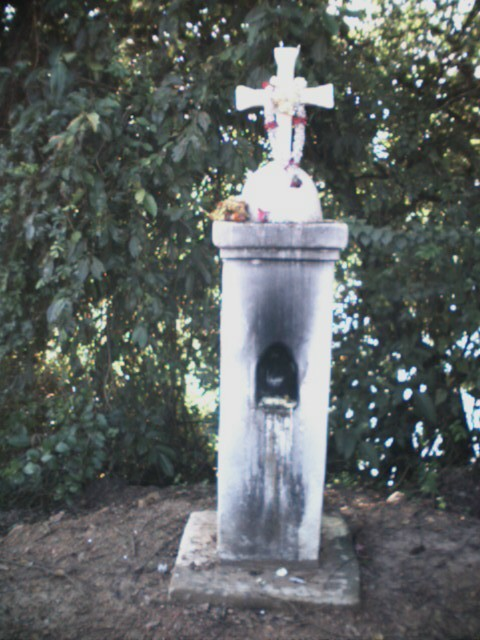
A typical white Sant Khuris (Holy Cross), of a Goan Catholic family, constructed using olden-style Portuguese architecture.

=== Goa inquisition ===
In 1560, the Inquisition established an office in Goa. It was finally abolished in 1812. Of the 1,582 persons convicted between 1560 and 1623, 45.2% were convicted for offenses related to Judaism and Islam. A compilation of the auto-da-fé statistics from 1560 to 1812 of the Goa Inquisition reveal that a total of 57 persons were burnt in the flesh and 64 in effigy (i.e. a statue resembling the person). All the burnt were convicted as relapsed heretics or for sodomy.

=== Indian Occupation ===
Since the 20th century, the percentage of the Christian population of Goa has been facing continual decrease. This is caused by a combination of permanent emigration of native Goans from Goa to cosmopolitan Indian cities (e.g. Mumbai, Bangalore) and foreign countries, combined with mass immigration of non-Goans from the rest of India since the 20th century, which has made Goans a virtual minority in the state. According to the 1909 statistics in the Catholic Encyclopedia, the total Catholic population was 293,628 out of a total population 365,291 (80.33%). Currently, Christians constitute 366,130 of the total population of 1,458,545 in Goa (25.10%) according to the 2011 census.

== Roman Catholicism ==
The Archbishop of the Roman Catholic Archdiocese of Goa and Daman carries the title Patriarch of the East Indies. Old Goa was once called "Rome of the East" and was the capital of the Roman church in the eastern world. The remains of the Jesuit St. Francis Xavier are kept in veneration in the Basilica of Bom Jesus. The Sé Catedral de Santa Catarina is one of the largest church buildings in Asia. The Igreja de São Francisco de Assis, built in 1661, now houses an archaeological museum. Churches and convents of Goa were declared a World Heritage Site by UNESCO in 1986. Plenty of churches can be seen all over the state with impressive Portuguese-Manueline-Baroque architecture. The Goan Catholics still prefer to use Konkani in the Roman script rather than its Devanagiri counterpart, especially during the liturgy.

== See also ==
- Christianity in India
- Goa Inquisition
- Cuncolim Massacre
- Christianization of Goa
