= Konkani people =

Indo-Aryan ethnolinguistic group

Konkanites
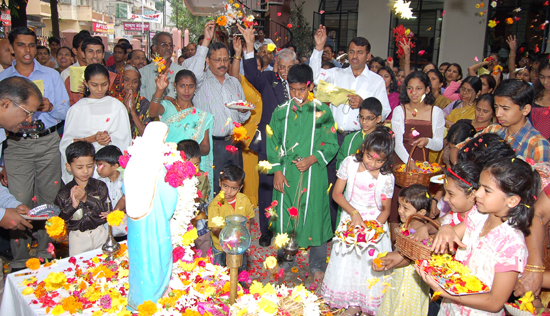
- Konkanite Christians celebrating Monti Fest in Poona (Pune), 2009.

Total population
- c. 2.3 million

Regions with significant populations
- Goa: 964,305
- Karnataka: 788,204
- Maharashtra: 399,204
- Dadra and Nagar Haveli and Daman and Diu: 96,305
- Dang district, Gujarat: 92,210
- Kerala: 70,000(approx.)

Languages
- Konkani; Marathi, Malvani, English, Kannada, Hindi-Urdu, Indo-Portuguese, Malayalam & Gujarati

Religion
- Hinduism Islam Buddhism Christianity

Related ethnic groups
- Indo-Aryans · Tuluvers · Luso-Indians · Marathis · Saurashtrians

The Konkani people or Konkanites are an Indo-Aryan ethnolinguistic group native to the Konkan region of the Indian subcontinent. They speak various dialects of the Konkani language. Following the Konkani language agitation, Konkani became the premier official language of Goa state. Konkani is also spoken by populations in Karnataka, Maharashtra, Damaon, Kerala and Gujarat. A large percentage of Konkani people are bilingual.

== Etymology ==
The word Koṅkaṇa (कोंकण) and, in turn Koṅkaṇi, is derived from Kuṅkaṇa (कुङ्कण) or Kuṅkaṇu (कुङ्कणु). Different authorities elaborate etymology of this word differently. They include:

- Koṇa (कोण) meaning top of the mountain.
- The name of aboriginal mother goddess, which is sometimes Sanskritised to mean goddess Renuka.
- Some scholars believe that Koṅkaṇa (कोङ्कण) comes from koṇa (कोण) "corner" and kaṇa (कण) "land". This arises from the legend of Paraśurāma's axe, which created a strip of land. This land is normally identified with Gomantaka or Govapuri (गोमन्तक or गोवपुरी), Keralaputra-Deśa (केरलपुत्र देश), Karāvaḷi (करावली; ಕರಾವಳಿ) or the whole of the Koṅkaṇa coast. It is therefore called Paraśurāma-Sṛṩṭi (परशुराम सृष्टि).

Ultimately, the name Konkani, comes from the word Konkaṇ, which means the people of Konkan.

== Sub-ethnic groups ==
=== Endonyms ===
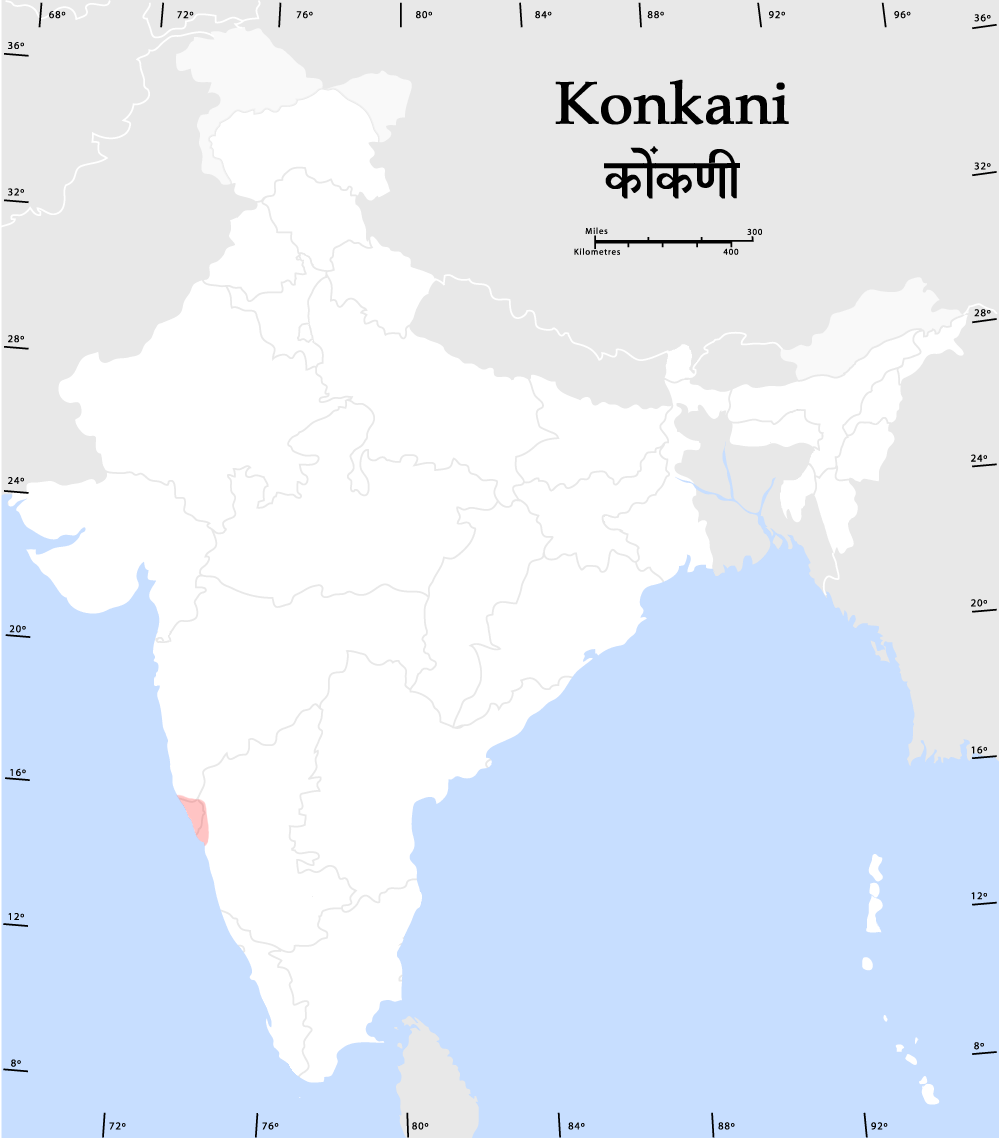
Goa: a State in India where Konkani is the official language

In general, in Konkani the masculine form used to address a Konkani speaker is Koṅkaṇo and the feminine form is Koṅkaṇe. The plural form is Konkane or Konkani. In Goa Konkano now refers only to Hindus, as Konkani Catholics do not address themselves as Konkanos, since they were banned by the Portuguese from referring to themselves this way. Saraswat Brahmins of Canara refer to the Konkanis as Āmcigelo /Āmcigelī. This literally means our tongue or people speaking our tongue. Though this is not common amongst the Goans, they normally refer to Konkani as Āmgelī bhās or our language. Sometimes Āmgele can be used in the Goan context to mean people from my community.

=== Exonyms ===
Many of the colonial documents mention them as the Concanees, Canarians, Concanies.

== History ==
=== Prehistory ===
The prehistoric region consisting of Modern Goa and some parts of Konkan adjoining Goa were inhabited by the Homo sapiens in Upper Paleolithic and Mesolithic phase i.e. 8000–6000 BC. The rock engraving in many places along the coast has proven the existence of hunter-gathers. Nothing much is known about these earliest settlers. Figures of mother goddess and many other motifs have been recovered which do not really shed light on the ancient culture and language. Traces of Shamanic religion have been found in Goa.

It is believed that tribes of Austric origin like Kols, Mundaris, Kharvis may have settled Goa and Konkan during the Neolithic period, living on hunting, fishing and a primitive form of agriculture since 3500 BC. According to Goan historian Anant Ramakrishna Dhume, the Gauda and Kunbi and other such castes are modern descendants of ancient Mundari tribes. In his work he mentions several words of Mundari origin in the Konkani language. He also elaborates on the deities worshiped by the ancient tribes, their customs, methods of farming and its overall impact on modern day Konkani society. They were in a Neolithic stage of primitive culture, and they were food-gatherers rather. The tribe known as the Konkas, from whom is derived the name of the region, Kongvan or Konkan with the other mentioned tribes formed reportedly the earliest settlers in the territory. Agriculture was not fully developed at this stage, and was just shaping up. The Kols and Mundaris might have been using stone and wood implements as iron implements were used by the megalithic tribes as late as 1200 BC. The Kol tribe is believed to have migrated from Gujarat. During this period worship of mother goddess in the form of anthill or Santer, was started. Anthill is called as Roen (Konkani:रोयण), this word has been derived from the Austric word Rono meaning with holes. The later Indo-Aryan and Dravidian settlers also adopted anthill worship, which was translated to Santara in Prakrit by them.

=== The later period ===
The first wave of Vedic people came and settled from Northern India in then Konkan region. Some of them might have been followers of Vedic religion. They were known to speak the earliest form of Prakrit or Vedic Sanskrit vernacular. This migration of the northerners is mainly attributed to the drying up of the Sarasvati River in Northern India. Many historians claim only Gaud Saraswat Brahmins and few of the other Brahmins to be their descendants. This hypothesis is not authoritative according to some. Balakrishna Dattaram Kamat Satoskar a renowned Goan Indologist and historian, in his work Gomantak prakruti ani sanskruti, Volume I explains that the original Sarasvat tribe consisted of people of all the folds who followed the Vedic fourfold system and not just Brahmins, as the caste system was not fully developed then, and did not play an important role.(see Gomantak prakruti ani sanskruti, Volume I).

The second wave of Indo-Aryans occurred sometime between 1700 and 1450 BC. This second wave migration was accompanied by Dravidians from the Deccan plateau. A wave of Kusha or Harappan people a Lothal probably around 1600 BC to escape submergence of their civilisation which thrived on sea-trade. The admixture of several cultures, customs, religions, dialects and beliefs, led to revolutionary change in the formation of early Konkani society.

=== The classical period ===
The Maurya era is marked with migrations from the East, advent of Buddhism and different Prakrit vernaculars.

The advent of Western Satrap rulers also led to many Scythian migrations, which later gave its way to the Bhoja kings. The Yadava Bhojas patronised Buddhism and settled many Buddhist converts of Greek and Persian origin.

The Abhirs, Chalukyas, Rashtrakutas, Shilaharas ruled the then Konkan-Goa for several years which was responsible for many changes in the society. Later The powerful Kadambas of Goa, came to power. During their rule, the society underwent radical transition. Close contact with the Arabs, Turks, introduction of Jainism, patronising Shaivism, use of Sanskrit and Kannada, the overseas trade had an overwhelming impact on the people.

=== 13th–19th century AD ===
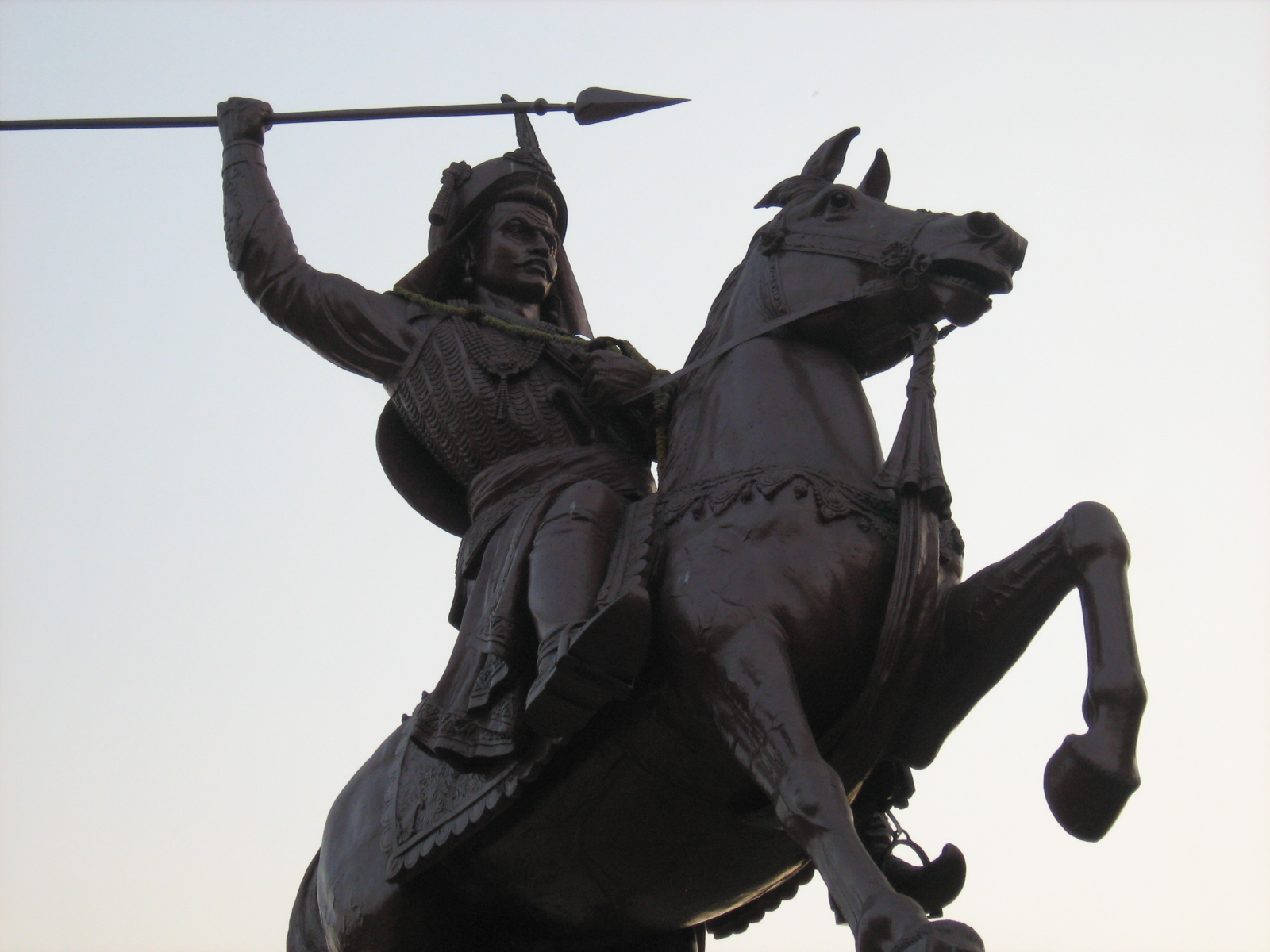
Baji Rao I, the second Peshwa of the Maratha Empire, was a Konkani and belonged to the Chitpavan community

==== Turkic rule ====
In 1350CE, Goa was conquered by the Bahmani Sultanate of Turkic origin. However, in 1370, the Vijayanagara Empire, a resurgent Hindu empire situated at modern day Hampi, reconquered the area. The Vijayanagara rulers held on to Goa for nearly 100 years, during which its harbours were important landing places for Arabian horses on their way to Hampi to strengthen the Vijayanagara cavalry. In 1469, however, Goa was reconquered, by the Bahmani Sultans. When this dynasty broke up in 1492, Goa became a part of Adil Shah's Bijapur Sultanate, who made Goa Velha their second capital.

==== Portuguese rule of Goa ====
The Portuguese conquest of Goa occurred in 1510 under the leadership of Afonso de Albuquerque and with the assistance of the local Hindus led by Timoji. The Christianisation of Goa and its simultaneous Lusitanisation soon followed.

The Goa Inquisition was established in 1560, briefly suppressed from 1774 to 1778, and finally abolished in 1812. Its main aim was to investigate New Christians for heresy, and to preserve the Catholic faith. Crypto-Jews who emigrated to Goa from the Iberian Peninsula to escape the Spanish Inquisition and the Portuguese Inquisition, were the main cause behind the launch of the Goa Inquisition. Some 16,202 persons were brought to trial by the Inquisition. 57 were sentenced to death and executed in person, another 64 were burned in effigy. Of these, 105 of them were men and 16 women. The rest of those convicted were subjected to lesser punishments or penanced. Those sentenced to various punishments totaled 4,046, out of whom 3,034 were men and 1,012 were women.

Seventy-one autos da fe were recorded. In the first few years alone, over 4000 people were arrested. According to the Chronista de Tissuary (Chronicles of Tiswadi), the last auto da fe was held in Goa on 7 February 1773.

In 1567, the campaign of destroying temples in Bardez was completed after the majority of the local Hindus had converted to Christianity. At the end of it, 300 Hindu temples were destroyed. Laws were enacted from 4 December 1567 prohibiting the public performance of Hindu rituals such as marriages, sacred thread wearing and cremation. All persons above 15 years of age were compelled to listen to Christian preaching, failing which they were punished. In 1583, Hindu temples at Assolna and Cuncolim were also destroyed by the Portuguese after the majority of the locals had converted.

The remaining few Hindus who wanted to keep their Hindu religion did so, by emigrating to the neighbouring territories that continued to be ruled by Bijapur, where these Hindus again had to pay jizya tax.

==== Impact on culture and language ====
Konkani language had originally been studied and Roman Konkani promoted by Catholic missionaries in Goa (e.g. Thomas Stephens) as a communication medium during the 16th century. The Maratha threat was compounded by their attacks on native Catholics and destruction of local churches during their repeated attacks on Goa in the 17th century. This led the Portuguese government to initiate a positive programme for the suppression of Konkani in Goa, in order to make native Catholic Goans identify fully with the Portuguese Empire. As a result, Konkani was suppressed and rendered unprivileged in Goa by the enforcement of Portuguese. Urged by the Franciscans, the Portuguese viceroy forbade the use of Konkani on 27 June 1684 and further decreed that within three years, the local people in general would speak the Portuguese language and use it in all their contacts and contracts made in Portuguese territories. The penalties for violation would be imprisonment. The decree was confirmed by the king on 17 March 1687. However, according to the Inquisitor António Amaral Coutinho's letter to the Portuguese monarch João V in 1731, these draconian measures were unsuccessful.

The fall of the "Province of the North" (which included Bassein, Chaul and Salsette) in 1739 led to the suppression of Konkani gaining new strength. On 21 November 1745, the Archbishop of Goa, Lourenço de Santa Maria e Melo (O.F.M.), decreed that fluency in Portuguese was mandatory for the Goan applicants to the priesthood, and also for all their immediate relatives (men as well as women). This language fluency would be confirmed via rigorous examinations by ordained priests. Furthermore, the Bamonns and Chardos were required to learn Portuguese within six months, failing which they would be denied the right to marriage.

The Jesuits, who had historically been the greatest advocates of Konkani, were expelled from Goa by the Marquis of Pombal in 1761. In 1812, the Archbishop decreed that children should be prohibited from speaking Konkani in schools. In 1847, this rule was extended to seminaries. In 1869, Konkani was completely banned in schools until Portugal became a Republic in 1910.

The result of this linguistic displacement was that Konkani in Goa became the língua de criados (language of the servants). Hindu and Catholic elites turned to Marathi and Portuguese, respectively. Ironically, Konkani is at present the 'cement' that binds all Goans across caste, religion and class and is affectionately termed Konkani Mai (Mother Konkani). Due to negative propaganda from the Maharashtrawadi Gomantak Party, Marathi was made the official language of Goa following the Annexation of Goa in 1961. Konkani received official recognition only in February 1987, when the Indian government recognized Konkani as the official language of Goa.

== Notable people ==
=== Actors ===
- Deepika Padukone

=== Athletes ===
- Brahmanand Sankhwalkar, footballer.
- Maximiliano Araújo, Uruguayan footballer who is quarter Konkani.

== See also ==
- Karnataka ethnic groups
- Udupi
- Malvani Konkani
- Malvani people

== Bibliography ==
- Hindu Temples and deities by Rui Gomes Pereira
- Bharatiya Samaj Vighatak Jati Varna Vyavastha by P. P. Shirodkar, published by Kalika Prakashan Vishwast Mandal
- Gazetteer of the Union Territory Goa, Daman and Diu: district gazetteer by Vithal Trimbak Gune, Goa, Daman and Diu (India). Gazetteer Dept, Published by Gazetteer Dept., Govt. of the Union Territory of Goa, Daman and Diu, 1979
- The Village Communities. A Historical and legal Perspective – Souza de, Carmo. In: Borges, Charles J. 2000: 112 and Velinkar, Joseph. Village Communities in Goa and their Evolution
- Caste and race in India by Govind Sadashiv Ghurye
- The cultural history of Goa from 10000 B.C.-1352 A.D. by Anant Ramkrishna Sinai Dhume
