= Panchkalshi =

Hindu community

Panchkalshi is a Hindu community. They are one of the original native communities of Mumbai metropolitan area in the Konkan division of India. Since the 19th century the community has called itself Somvanshi Kshatriya Pathare (SKP).

SKPs share an important status in the history of this city as land owners and as a community which gave the city of Mumbai many architects, engineers, building contractors and visual artists. Their last names reflect the locations of the land they owned in the different parts of the city - Chemburkar, Dadarkars, Mahimkar, Goregaonkars, Paralkars, Chaulkar,Urankar, Jukar(Juhukar) etc. The Chogles were credited to be the navy builders of the Maratha Navy. They were rewarded by the ruling Marathas with land near Mumbai, which now constitutes Borivali and the surrounding suburbs. The SKPs are also based in the nearby places of Mumbai like Alibag, Uran, Chaul, Revdanda, Murud, Maap gaon, Kihim and others.

== Culture ==
Ritually, their practices resemble CKP and Pathare Prabhu rituals.

Pachkalshi have founded at least three Hindu temples in Mumbai. The Malkeshwar temple in Parel and the Shiva (Mahadev) temple named after the Parli Vaijnath temple is said to have been built by them. Another temple built by Pachkalshi is the Vajreshwari Temple, for their Kuldevi (clan deity). The community celebrates a unique festival. On Pithori Amavasya (the last date in Lunar Shaka month of Shravan), the women in the family pray to sixty-four yoginis for the wellbeing of the children. The women make offerings to figurines of the 64 deities made of flour. The eldest woman in the family holds the figurines on her head and the children surround her. It signifies that the deities will keep a watch on the children.

== Notable community members ==
- Gangaji Naik, prominent 18th-century Maratha warrior and ally of Chimaji Appasaheb Peshwa during the battle of Vasai (1737–1738).
- Padma Shri Hari Govindrao Vartak from Vasai, former Minister Government of Maharashtra.
- Trp th. Flrp GT g Sakharam Arjun (1839–1885), physician and a founding member of the Bombay Natural History Society. Stepfather of the pioneering woman physician Rukhmabai
- Dr Rukhmabai (1864–1955), One of the first female Indian doctors.
- Sanjay Raut, Member of Parliament Rajya Sabha, Shiv Sena (UBT).
- Pandhari Juker, veteran Bollywood make-up artist.
- Hitendra Thakur, politician from Vasai.
- Sachit Patil, Marathi Actor,Director, Writer
