= Prabhu =

Prabhu means master or prince in Sanskrit and many of the Indian languages; it is a name sometimes applied to God.

== As as caste name ==
Prabhu has been the name of 2 endogamous communities of Kshatriyas from Mumbai and surrounding districts, named Chandraseniya Kayastha Prabhu and Pathare Prabhu. These two communities further had subdivisions called Davane Prabhu and Kanchole Prabhu, which have ceased to exist now as they have merged back into their parent communities. They have historically been large feudal lords, statesmen, administrators, soldiers & commanders, revenue collectors & accountants, and held other bureaucratic positions.

Along with the Saraswat, Deshastha and Chitpawan Brahmin communities they have been considered as "advanced castes" due to equal ritual status, even as Kshatriyas, and similarities in education and occupational status.

The Chandraseniya Kayastha Prabhus descended from ancient Haihaya Yadavas who settled in the western Himalayas claiming Lunar descent, and the Pathare Prabhus (earlier known as Dhruv Prabhus) descended from Raghuvanshi Kshatriyas claiming Solar descent as well as Paurava Kshatriyas of the Gangetic plains claiming Lunar descent as well, before arriving down towards coastal Maharashtra during the late medieval era.

== As a title/surname ==
Prabhu is a surname among Gaud saraswat Brahmins, saraswat Brahmins and other Brahmins across the Konkan Coast in India, from Karnataka and Maharashtra to Goa.

"Prabhu" as a title is mainly found among Gaud saraswat Brahmins, Saraswat Brahmins, Karhade Brahmins and other Brahmins in Maharashtra, Karnataka and Goa, based on the similarity of occupations to the Chandraseniya Kayastha Prabhu community present to the North of Ratnagiri and the Maval region. Prabhu was a title accorded to the governor or mayor of the main village/town of the taluka (district). The Prabhus may have also occupied official posts in the central administration, without prejudice to their original posts which were hereditary. Traditionally, a Prabhu was a village chief, Ministers, Zamindars, administrators, landlord and as such a master to the many agricultural labourers that were needed to cultivate his lands.

== Notable people ==
- Prabhu (actor), Indian actor and film producer
- Lakshman Prabhu, a minister in the court of the Silhara dynasty
- Rai Gogadev Prabhu Pradhan (1265-1305), Pradhan and Rai(defacto ruler) of the Malwa region
- Baji Prabhu Deshpande, Maratha army general-Sarnaubat and Deshpande of Bandal army
- Murarbaji Prabhu Deshpande, Maratha army general-Senapati and Deshpande of More army
- Balaji Avji Prabhu Chitnis, Chief Secretary of the Maratha Empire
- Khando Ballal Prabhu Chitnis, Chief Secretary of the Maratha Empire
- Sakharam Hari Prabhu Gupte, Military commander and Secretary of the Maratha Empire
- Vitthalrao Devaji Prabhu Dighe, commander-in-chief of Kathiawar and Saurashtra region
- Rango Bapuji Prabhu Gupte, Political Diplomat of the Maratha Empire and 1857 uprising leader
- Manohar Prabhu Parrikar (1955–2019), Indian politician
- Suresh Prabhu (born 1953), Indian politician
- Bolanthur Krishna Prabhu (1882–?), wrote Chandrahas Natak
- Gayathri Prabhu (born 1974), Indian novelist
- Girish Prabhu, Indian musician
- Uday Krishna Prabhu (born 1954), Indian sprinter
- Mamta Prabhu (born 1983), table tennis player
- Manjiri Prabhu (born 1964), Indian author, TV producer and filmmaker
- N. U. Prabhu (1924–2022), Indian-American mathematician
- Neeraj Prabhu (born 1976), Indian-born former English cricketer
- R.S. Prabhu (born 1950), Indian film producer and film director
- Rakesh Prabhu, Indian cricketer
- S. R. Prabhu, Indian film producer
- Satyajit Prabhu, music arranger, composer, and multi-instrumentalist
- Seetharam Prabhu (born 1964), Indian cricket umpire
- Shashi Prabhu (born 1944), Indian architect
- Srinivas Prabhu, actor
- Sunil Prabhu (born 1969), Indian politician
- Vasant K. Prabhu, professor

== See also ==
- Prabhu Communities, a group of distinct Hindu castes found in Maharashtra, India
- Chaitanya Mahaprabhu (1486–1533)
- A. C. Bhaktivedanta Swami Prabhupada (1896–1977), Indian spiritual teacher
- Rani, the Sanskrit word for "princess"
- Prabhu (film), a 1979 Indian Malayalam-language film
- Hey Prabhu!, a 2019 Indian web TV show
