= Prabhu Communities =

Group of related Hindu castes

The 'Prabhu caste' or Prabhu communities are a group of related Hindu castes of Madhya Pradesh, Gujarat, Daman and Northern districts of Konkan region in Maharashtra, India. There are four such castes, all having different ritual and social status within the caste system of Maharashtra, but all of them having traditions traced back to the 12th century. They are Chandraseniya Kayastha Prabhu, Pathare Prabhu, Kanchole Prabhus and the Davane Prabhu.

== Subdivisions ==
- Chandraseniya Kayastha Prabhu (popularly known as CKP)
- Pathare Prabhu
- Drauv Prabhu also known as Kanchole Prabhus or Pathare Prabhu Kanchole

== Details ==
=== Chandraseniya Kayastha Prabhu (CKP) & pathare prabhu ===
The CKPs and Pathare Prabhu are one of the subdivisions of Prabhu community along with Davane prabhus were later included in CKPs. Along with the Saraswat, Deshastha and Chitpawan they have been considered as an "advanced caste" due to similarities in education and occupational status.

The Chandraseniya Kayastha Prabhu (CKP) and Pathare Prabhu are considered intellectual classes (other than Brahmins) and have been advanced in education. Both have vedic upanayana (thread ceremonies or 'munj' in marathi) and their 'vedokta' or rights to study of Vedas and perform Vedic rituals has been formally approved by the Brahmin councils and ratified by the Shankaracharyas based on shastras. In case of Pathare Prabhus the formal approval was given by the Shankaracharya of Shingeri and in the case of CKPs by Brahmin councils of Pune, Banares, Bajirao II and the Shankaracharya of Karvir and Sanakareshwar Math (a Deshastha Brahmin). (Note: quote on page 173:Rajvadyanchi Gagabhatti appendix 4, pp-1-21. The Shankaracharya's letter contains three documents which he produces verbatim, two from Banares Brahmins (1779, 1801) proving the CKPs vedokta and one from Pune Brahmins award Ratified by Bajirav II in 1796.)

=== Kanchole Prabhus ===
The Drauv (or Dhurus) are also known as Kanchole Prabhus. It is said that they were part of the Pathare Prabhu community but were excommunicated for disobeying caste rules. The Kacholes made several attempts and appeals to the Pathare Prabhu caste to accept them back. The first was made in 1836, the second and third in 1881. In November 1881, 38 gentlemen from the Pathare Prabhu community confirmed the Kanchole's "purity of blood", similar religious beliefs, similar gotras and characteristics and professions, similarity in writings, status etc. Despite these proofs they were not readmitted due to rigid 19th century rules regarding caste pollution.
