= Kudaldeshkar Gaud Brahmin =

Brahmin community from Konkan region of India

Regions with significant populations
- Primary populations in: Goa, Maharashtra, Karnataka Populations in: United Kingdom, United States, Canada

Languages
- Konkani, Marathi, Malwani, Maharashtrian Konkani

Religion
- Hinduism

Related ethnic groups
- Konkani people, Goud Saraswat Brahmin, Chandraseniya Kayastha Prabhu, Pathare Prabhu, Padye, Karhade Brahmin

Kudaldeshkar Gaud Brahmin is a Brahmin sub-caste from the western coast of India, residing in the Konkan division of Maharashtra and Goa. They also known as Kudaldeshkar Aadya Gaud Brahmin, Kudaldeshkar and sometimes Kudalkar Brahmins. They speak Marathi, and the Malwani dialect of Konkani.

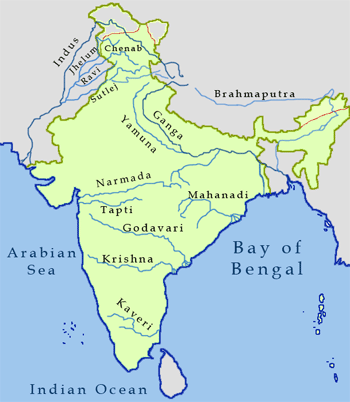
The location of state of Maharashtra in India. Majority of Kudaldeshkars live in Maharashtra and the adjacent state of Goa (left)

== History ==
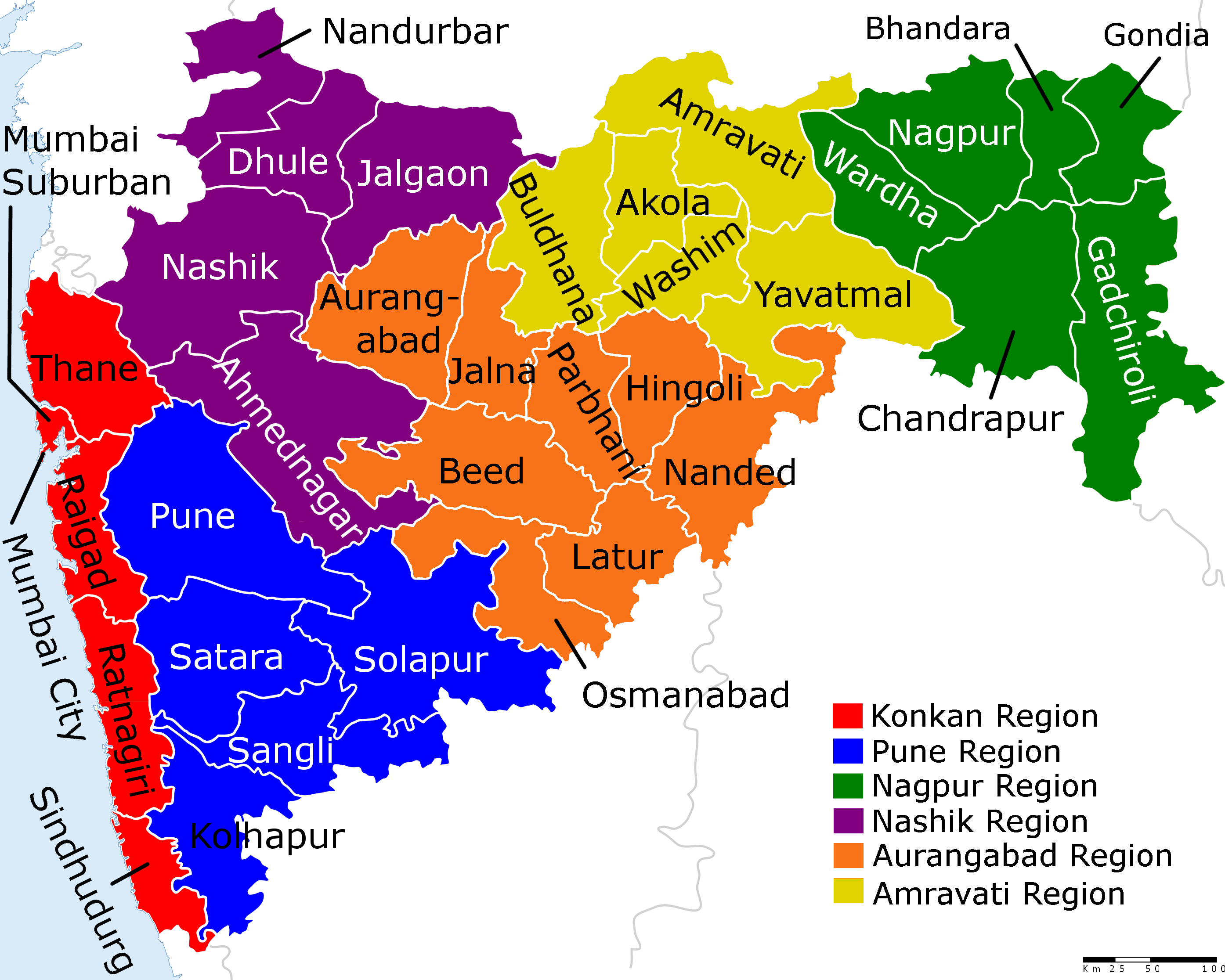
Divisions of Maharashtra. The red region is an approximate indication of Konkan, the coastal region of Maharashtra and the ancestral home of Kudaldeshkars

The Aadya Gaud Brahmins who settled near the Kudal region, from the region of Gudadesh near Shravasti in north India and not from Bengal.

== Philosophy ==
Kudaldeshkar Gaud Brahmins follow Shankaracharya's Advaita school of philosophy, and have their own three centuries old Matha in Dabholi village in the Indian state of Maharashtra. The first pontiff of the Shreemat Purnanand Swamiji was initiated into Sanyasa by Vishwananda Swamiji. The present 20th pontiff of the Math is Pradyumnanand Swamiji.

== Language ==
The original language of Kudaldeshkars is Malwani. The Malvani dialects of Konkani are also referred to as creoles between Konkani and Marathi. Today Malwani is more significantly identified as the principal language of Kudaldeshkars and also of the natives of the Sindhudurg district. There is no unique script or text characters for Malwani and it is generally written in Devanagari. They also speak Marathi in Maharashtra, and Konkani in Goa and Karnataka. Malwani is also called Kudali, originally known as Kudwali.

== See also ==
- Goud Saraswat Brahmin
- Kudal
- Konkan
- List of Goan Brahmin communities
- Rajapur Brahmins
