= List of Goan Brahmin communities =

List of Brahmin communities of Goa, India.

- Gaud Saraswat Brahmin
- Kudaldeshkar Gaud Brahmin
- Rajapur Saraswat Brahmin
- Karhade Brahmin
- Chitpavan Brahmins
- Daivadnya Brahmins
