= List of British representatives in Muscat and Oman =

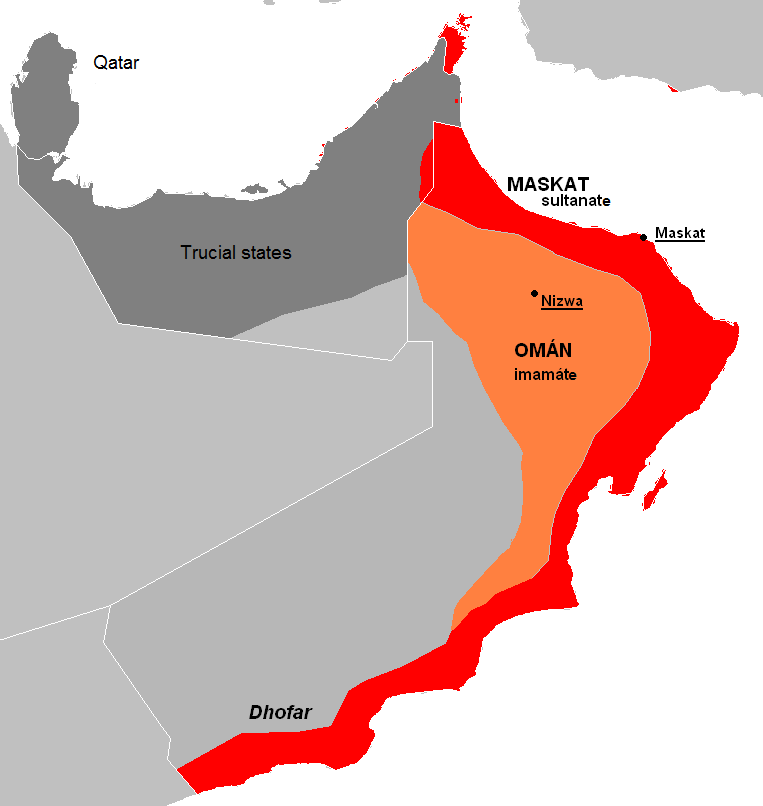
Sultanate of Muscat and Oman (red), shown with the Imamate of Oman (orange) and the Trucial States (grey).

This is a list of British representatives in Muscat and Oman from 1800 to 1971. They were responsible for representing British interests in the Sultanate of Muscat and Oman while the country was a British protectorate (from 20 March 1891 until 2 December 1971). Muscat and Oman was reconstituted as the modern-day Sultanate of Oman after the protectorate ended.

For British representatives in Oman since 1971, see: List of ambassadors of the United Kingdom to Oman.

== List ==
(Dates in italics indicate de facto continuation of office)

Tenure	Incumbent	Notes
Agents at Muscat
1800 to 6 September 1800	Archibald Hamilton Bogle	
1801 to 1802	David Seton	First time
1802 to 1804	David Seton	Second time
November 1804 to May 1805	Vacant	
May 1805 to 2 August 1809	David Seton	Third time
1808	W. Watts	Acting for Seton
September 1809 to 17 December 1809	William Chicheley Bunce	
1809 to 1810	Nicholas Hankey Smith	
1810 to 1840	Vacant	
May 1840 to 1841	Atkins Hamerton	Consul from 1841
1841 to May 1861	residency located in the Sultanate of Zanzibar	See List of British representatives in Zanzibar
Political Agents
May 1861 to February 1862	William M. Pengelley	
February 1862 to October 1862	M. Green	
October 1862 to January 1863	Unknown	Acting
January 1863 to February 1867	Herbert Frederick Disbrowe	First time
March 1867 to February 1869	George Andrew Atkinson	Acting
February 1869 to 8 January 1870	Herbert Frederick Disbrowe	Second time
8 January 1870 to 1 May 1871	Alfred Cotton Way	
8 May 1871 to 14 December 1872	Edward Charles Ross	
30 December 1872 to 7 June 1877	Samuel Barrett Miles	First time
7 June 1877 to 4 January 1878	P. J. C. Robertson	Acting
4 January 1878 to 14 June 1879	Samuel Barrett Miles	Second time
14 June 1879 to 16 July 1879	Unknown	Acting
16 July 1879 to 2 January 1880	Charles Euan-Smith	
28 February 1880 to 28 October 1880	Charles Grant	First time
28 October 1880 to 15 August 1881	Samuel Barrett Miles	Third time
16 August 1881 to 22 March 1883	Charles Grant	Second time
22 March 1883 to 20 April 1883	Unknown	Acting
20 April 1883 to 17 September 1883	Edward Mockler	First time
20 September 1883 to 2 April 1886	Samuel Barrett Miles	Fourth time
2 April 1886 to 25 October 1886	Edward Mockler	Second time
1 November 1886 to 16 April 1887	Samuel Barrett Miles	Fifth time
16 April 1887 to 2 March 1889	Edward Mockler	Third time
2 March 1889 to 30 March 1889	Atmaram Sadarhiva Grovindin Jayakar	First time, acting
31 March 1889 to 15 December 1889	Wallace Christopher Ramsay Stratton	Acting
16 December 1889 to 29 March 1890	Charles Yate	
29 March 1890 to 30 November 1890	Atmaram Sadarhiva Grovindin Jayakar	Second time, acting
1 December 1890 to 20 March 1891	Edward Mockler	Fourth time
Consuls
20 March 1891 to 14 October 1891	Edward Mockler	
14 October 1891 to 27 November 1892	Atmaram Sadarhiva Grovindin Jayakar	First time, acting
27 November 1892 to 19 April 1895	James Hayes Sadler	First time
19 April 1895 to 22 May 1895	Atmaram Sadarhiva Grovindin Jayakar	Second time, acting
23 May 1895 to 23 November 1895	John Frederick Whyte	
24 November 1895 to 17 April 1896	James Hayes Sadler	Second time
17 April 1896 to 12 June 1897	Francis Granville Beville	
12 June 1897 to 15 September 1897	Atmaram Sadarhiva Grovindin Jayakar	Third time, acting
16 September 1897 to 1 October 1899	Christopher George Forbes Fagan	
1 October 1899 to 2 January 1904	Percy Cox	
2 January 1904 to July 1906	William George Grey	First time
July 1906 to November 1906	William Henry Irvine Shakespear	Acting
November 1906 to April 1908	William George Grey	Second time
April 1908 to July 1908	N. Scott	Acting
July 1908 to November 1908	Frank McConaghey	
November 1908 to April 1910	Robert Erskine Holland	
April 1910 to April 1911	Arthur Prescott Trevor	
April 1911 to March 1914	Stuart George Knox	
March 1914 to October 1915	Robert Arthur Edward Benn	
15 October 1915 to 16 January 1916	Hugh Stewart	First time
16 January 1916 to 16 February 1916	Claude Tulloch Ducat	First time
17 February 1916 to 8 March 1916	Hugh Stewart	Second time
9 March 1916 to 14 June 1916	Claude Tulloch Ducat	Second time
15 June 1916 to 22 June 1916	A. R. Burton	Acting
23 June 1916 to 9 October 1916	Evelyn Berkeley Howell	
10 October 1916 to 7 November 1916	Alan Richard Leopold King-Mason	Acting
8 November 1916 to 12 October 1917	Lionel Berkeley Holt Haworth	First time
12 October 1917 to 30 November 1917	John Macdonald Brickman	Acting
1 December 1917 to 17 October 1919	Lionel Berkeley Holt Haworth	Second time
17 October 1919 to 3 March 1920	Ronald Wingate	First time
3 March 1920 to 10 April 1920	Mehervanji Janishedji Gazdar	First time, acting
11 April 1920 to 20 October 1921	Ronald Wingate	Second time
21 October 1921 to 28 February 1923	Maitland Easton Rae	
1 March 1923 to 11 September 1923	Ronald Wingate	Third time
11 September 1923 to 28 September 1923	Mehervanji Janishedji Gazdar	Second time, acting
28 September 1923 to 31 October 1924	Reginald Graham Hinde	
31 October 1924 to 24 May 1925	Charles Gilbert Crosthwaite	First time
24 May 1925 to 7 October 1925	Reginald George Evelyn William Alban	First time, acting
8 October 1925 to 12 February 1926	Charles Gilbert Crosthwaite	Second time
12 February 1926 to 9 September 1926	Cyril Charles Johnson Barrett	
10 September 1926 to 22 September 1926	G. A. Richardson	Acting
23 September 1926 to 15 June 1930	George Patterson Murphy	
15 June 1930 to 30 May 1931	Trenchard Craven William Fowle	First time
30 May 1931 to 31 October 1931	Reginald George Evelyn William Alban	Second time, acting
1 November 1931 to 25 July 1932	Trenchard Craven William Fowle	Second time
25 July 1932 to 13 November 1932	Reginald George Evelyn William Alban	Third time, acting
14 November 1932 to 23 March 1933	Claude Edward Urquhart Bremner	First time
23 March 1933 to 16 June 1933	Reginald George Evelyn William Alban	Fourth time, acting
17 June 1933 to 6 June 1935	Claude Edward Urquhart Bremner	Second time
6 June 1935 to 26 April 1939	Ralph Ponsonby Watts	
26 April 1939 to 3 April 1940	Tom Hickinbotham	First time
3 April 1940 to 26 July 1940	John Baron Howes	First time, acting
27 July 1940 to 14 August 1941	Tom Hickinbotham	Second time
14 August 1941 to 22 January 1942	John Baron Howes	Second time, acting
22 January 1942 to 22 May 1942	Reginald George Evelyn William Alban	Fifth time, acting
23 May 1942 to 21 September 1943	Cornelius James Pelly	
21 September 1943 to 31 October 1943	Richard Ernest Rowland Bird	
1 November 1943 to 1 November 1944	Roy Douglas Metcalfe	
1 November 1944 to 22 April 1945	Arnold Crenshaw Galloway	
22 April 1945 to 29 November 1945	Ralph Ingram Hallows	
1 December 1945 to 13 June 1947	Charles Stewart	First time
November 1946	Joseph Edward Havelock Hudson	Acting for Stewart
13 June 1947 to August 1947	Joseph Edward Havelock Hudson	
August 1947 to August 1948	Charles Stewart	Second time
April 1948 to August 1948	Patrick Desmond Stobart	Acting for Stewart
August 1948 to September 1949	Randall Erskine Ellison	
July 1949 to September 1949	R. McC. Andrew	Acting for Ellison
Consuls-General
September 1949 to October 1958	Frederick Charles Leslie Chauncy	
October 1958 to May 1960	William Neve Monteith	
May 1960 to May 1963	John Fleetwood Stewart Phillips	
May 1963 to October 1965	John Spenser Ritchie Duncan	
October 1965 to September 1969	Derrick Charles Carden	
September 1969 to 1971	David Crawford	Served at the time of the 1970 Omani coup d'état

== See also ==
- History of Oman
- Foreign relations of Oman
