= Gramanya =

Gramanya (Devanagari:ग्रामण्य,Grāmaṇya) refers to a dispute or discussion related to castes in Maharashtra in the past few centuries that related to supposed violation of the Brahmanical ritual code of behavior.

== Overview ==
Gramanya is a crystallisation of conflicts between two castes of individuals belonging to the same caste, and the same group, about observance of certain religious practices vis-a-vis, other members of the society or of the particular caste group. There are two types of Gramanyas inter-caste, and intra-caste. Records mention that Gramanyas took place in Maharashtra in late 18th and 19th century and various castes were involved in many disputes. There are also recorded instances of Gramanyas between Gaud Saraswat and the Chitpawans, CKPs and Chitpawans, Pathare Prabhus and the Chitpawans and the Shukla Yujurvedi Deshastha Brahmins and the Chitpawans. The intra-caste disputes involved the supposed violation of the Brahmanical ritual code of behavior. Verdicts of Gramanyas were given by arbitrators(religious councils or religious leaders) that decided the ritual status of the caste.
