= Shankar Ramchandra Bhise =

Indian novelist (1894–1971)

- Born: 1894
- Died: 1971 (aged 76–77)
- Other names: "Acharya Bhise", "Bhise Guruji"
- Occupations: Social worker, educationalist, novelist
- Known for: Work for Adivasi education and development
- Notable work: Janglantil Chhaya

Shankar Ramchandra Bhise (born into the Marathi CKP family; 1894–1971), popularly known as "Acharya Bhise" or "Bhise Guruji", was a social worker, educationalist and novelist devoted to the education and development of the Adivasi community.

Bhise wrote novels, including Janglantil Chhaya, which discusses the exploitation and conditions of Adivasi forest tribes.
