= Novetzke =

Novetzke is a surname. Notable people with the surname include:

- Christian Lee Novetzke (born 1969), American Indologist and scholar
- Sally J. Novetzke (1932–2025), American political aide and diplomat
