= List of British representatives in the Trucial States =

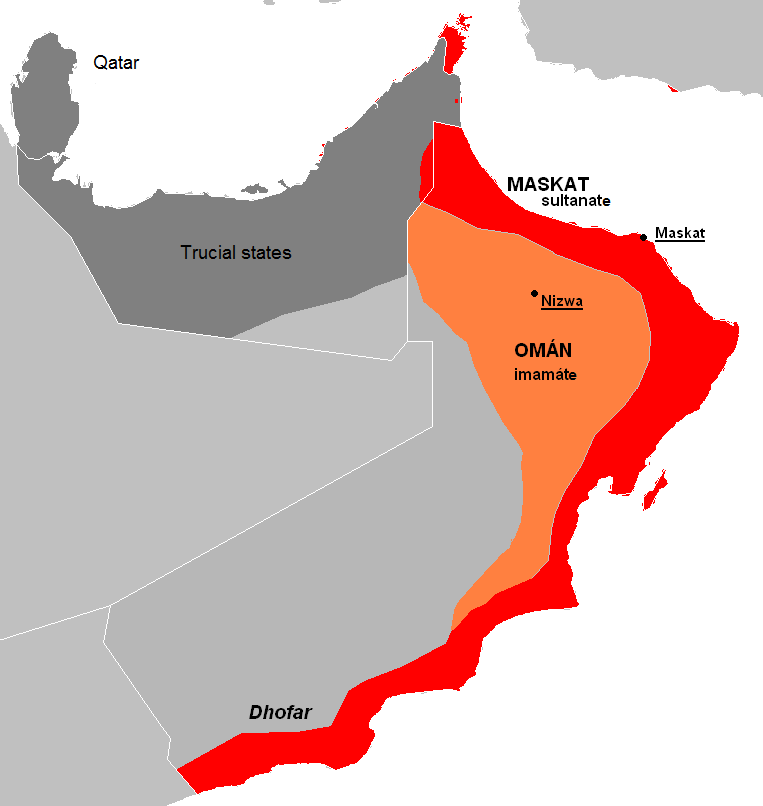
Trucial States (grey), shown with the Sultanate of Muscat and Oman (red) and the Imamate of Oman (orange).

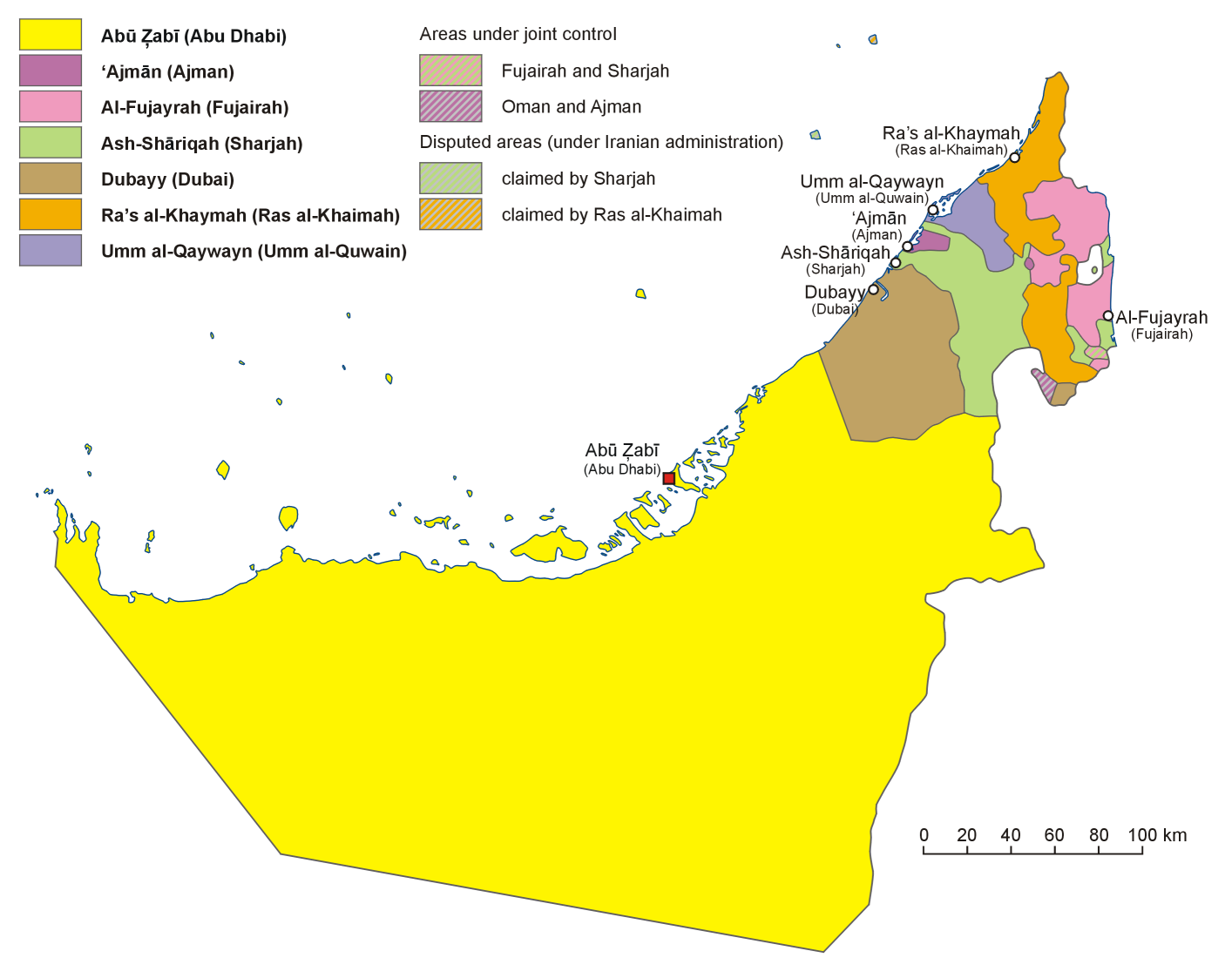
Emirates of the UAE.

This is a list of British representatives in the Trucial States from 1939 to 1971. They were responsible for representing British interests in the Trucial States, a British protectorate consisting of seven emirates in the Persian Gulf, which formed the United Arab Emirates (UAE) after the protectorate ended.

For British representatives in the UAE since 1971, see: List of ambassadors of the United Kingdom to the United Arab Emirates.

== List ==
(Dates in italics indicate de facto continuation of office)

Tenure	Incumbent	Notes
Political Officers (in Sharjah)
October 1939 to October 1940	John Baron Howes	
October 1940 to April 1941	Roy Douglas Metcalfe	
7 April 1941 to April 1942	Cornelius James Pelly	First time
March 1943 to April 1944	Maurice Patrick Tandy	
May 1944 to October 1944	Michael Hadow	
October 1944 to April 1945	Richard Ernest Rowland Bird	
3 April 1945 to April 1946	Raymond Clive Murphy	
May 1946 to January 1947	Hugh Rance	First time
January 1947 to May 1947	Gordon Noel Jackson	First time
May 1947 to June 1947	Hugh Rance	Second time
June 1947 to July 1947	Cornelius James Pelly	Second time
July 1947 to August 1947	Gordon Noel Jackson	Second time
1947 to 1948	Joseph Edward Havelock Hudson	
1948 to 1950	Patrick Desmond Stobart	
1950 to 1951	Harry Denis Mitchell	
1951 to 1952	John Wilton	
1952	Martin Buckmaster	
1952 to 1953	Michael Scott Weir	
Political Agents (in Dubai)
20 May 1953 to 1955	John William Wall	Most known by his pen name Sarban
1955 to 1956	Christopher Pirie-Gordon	
1956 to 1958	John Peter Tripp	
1958 to 1961	Donald Hawley	
1961 to 1964	Alfred James M. Craig	
1964 to 1966	Glencairn Balfour Paul	
1966 to 1968	David Roberts	
1968 to 1971	Julian Bullard	
1971	Julian Fortay Walker	

== See also ==
- Persian Gulf Residency
- History of the United Arab Emirates
- Foreign relations of the United Arab Emirates
