= Tergaonkar =

Tergaonkar is a surname found in Karnataka and Maharashtra states in India. It is found among Hindus of the Goud Saraswat Brahmin community.

The surname is also found among Deshastha Brahmins and Daivadnya Brahmins.

The village Tergaon is situated in Haliyal Block in Uttar Kannada district in the state of Karnataka. Most of the Tergaonkars speak Kannada, Marathi or Konkani.

== See also ==
- List of Goud Saraswat Brahmin surnames
