= Bolanthur Krishna Prabhu =

Balanthur Krishna Prabhu
- Born: 13 November,1882; India
- Writing career
- Genres: Poem, Drama
- Notable work: Chandrahas

Bolanthur Krishna Prabhu was a Konkani Dramatist and Poet. His musical "Chandrahas" in 1912, is believed to be the first Konkani stage musical.

== Early life ==
Krishna Prabhu born on 13 November 1882 at Bolanthur, Bantwal Taluk in to a Konkani speaking Goud Saraswat Brahmin family of father, Govinda, and mother, Pommie. His maternal uncle, Soukar Srinivasa Prabhu of Bantwal, who had no male issue, brought him to Bantwal where he studied up to 7th standard in the Mission School.

== Literary works ==
Bolanthur Krishna Prabhu wrote Chandrahas Natak and it saw four editions. His other works include Prahlada Charitre, Draupadi Vastrapaharana, Dhruvacharitre, Krishna Janmashtami, Nalacharitre, and Shri Krishna-Satyabhama Samwada. His Kannada Work Sannavara Subodha Shataka is a collection of poems to impart ethics and morals to the young. It was prescribed as a school text book under the Madras government.
