= Bill Carden (diplomat) =

British diplomat (1921–2006)

Bill Carden CMG
- Born: 30 October 1921
- Died: 26 April 2006 (aged 84)
- Education: Christ Church, Oxford

Derrick Charles "Bill" Carden CMG (30 October 1921 – 26 April 2006) was a British diplomat and colonial administrator. He was an ambassador to several countries.

== Life ==
Educated at Marlborough College and Christ Church, Oxford, Carden joined the Sudan Political Service and then served in the Government of Anglo-Egyptian Sudan until Independence. He entered HM Diplomatic Service in 1956. He was appointed Consul in Benghazi at 1958, and Consul-General for Muscat and Oman in 1966. He served as Director of Middle East Centre for Arab Studies between 1969 and 1973. He served as Ambassador to the Yemen (1973–1976) and Ambassador to Sudan (1977–1979).

He was appointed Companion, Order of St. Michael and St. George in the 1974 New Year Honours.

Carden's obituary in The Times commented: "He was in no way ashamed of his "imperialist" past, and was [...] philosophical about the British departure."
