= Moroba Kanhoba =

Moroba Kanhoba Vijaykar was a 19th-century writer and social reformer belonging to the Pathare Prabhu community of Maharashtra. He wrote the famous Marathi novel "Ghashiram Kotwal" based on a true character in the 18th century. As a reformer who believed in the rights of women, especially widows, he married a widow in 1870. Unfortunately, the couple was found dead within one year of their marriage.
