= Chitpavan Brahmins =

Indian Brahmin sub-caste inhabiting the Konkan region

Chitpavan/Kokanastha Brahmins
- Religions: Hinduism
- Languages: Marathi, Gujarati, Kannada, Chitpavani Konkani.
- Populated states: Konkan (Coastal Maharashtra, Goa, Karnataka, some parts of Madhya Pradesh, Gujarat)

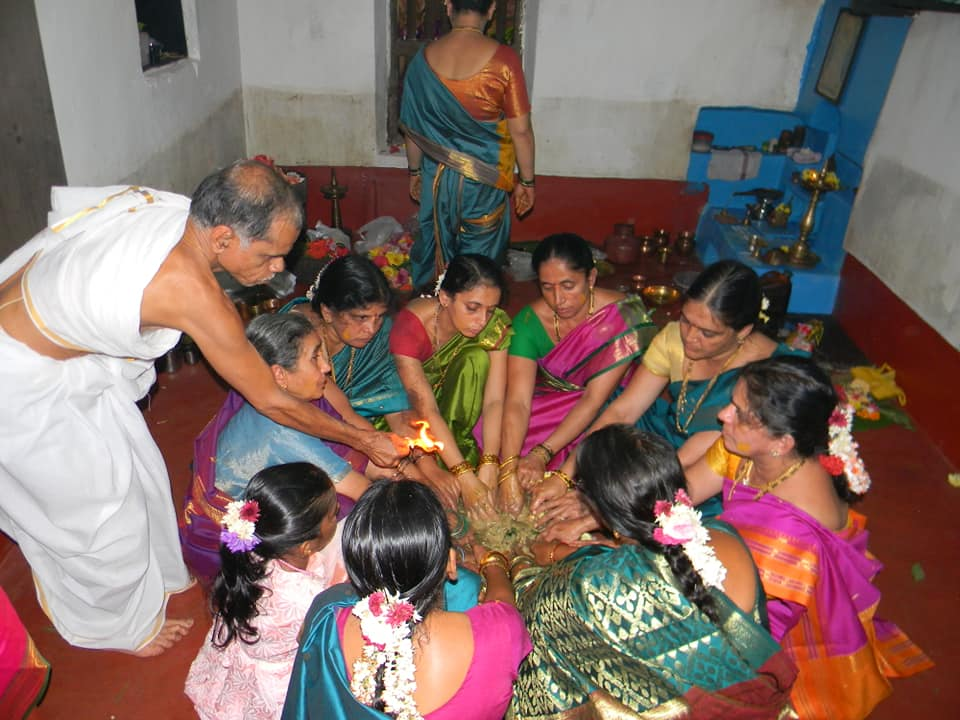
Chitpavan Brahmins practising Bodan, a rite performed on important occasions like birth or marriage

The Chitpavan Brahmin or the Kokanastha Brahmin is a Hindu Maharashtrian Brahmin community inhabiting Konkan, the coastal region of the state of Maharashtra. Initially working as messengers and spies in the late seventeenth century, the community came into prominence during the 18th century when the heirs of Peshwa from the Bhat family of Balaji Vishwanath became the de facto rulers of the Maratha Empire. Until the 18th century, the Chitpavans were held in low esteem by the Deshastha, the older established Brahmin community of the Karnataka-Maharashtra region.

As per Jayant Lele, the influence of the Chitpavans in the Peshwa era as well as the British era has been greatly exaggerated because even during the time of the most prominent Peshwas, their political legitimacy and their intentions were not trusted by all levels of the administration, not even by Shivaji's successors. He adds that after the defeat of Peshwas in the Anglo-Maratha wars, Chitpavans were one of the Hindu communities to flock to western education in the Bombay Province of British India.

== Etymology and origin ==
The Chitpavans are also known as Kokanastha Brahmins.

The etymology of their name is given in a legendary myth of the chapter citpāvanabrāhmaṇotpattiḥ i.e. "Origin of the Citpāvan brahmins" in the Hindu Sanskrit scripture Sahyadrikhanda (Note: The book is less than 400 years old per Alexander Kyd Nairne, a British colonial era author.) of the Skanda Purana. According to this chapter, Parashurama, the sixth incarnation of God Vishnu, who could not find any Brahmins in Konkan to perform rituals for him, found sixty fishermen who had gathered near a funeral pyre near the ocean shore. These sixty fisherman families were purified and Sanskritized to Brahminhood. Since the funeral pyre is called Chita and pure as pavana, the community was henceforth known by the name Chitapavan or "purified at the location of a funeral pyre". However, 'Chita' also means 'mind' in Sanskrit and the Chitapavans prefer "pure of mind" instead of "pure from the pyre". One scholar suggests that the author of the current version was a Deshastha Brahmin and there were earlier suggestions of similarity with the Sadbodhacintāmaṇi published by the community of goldsmiths from Bombay. Madhav Deshpande (2010) rejects these suggestions because it is inconceivable that a Deshastha brahmin would write a "pro-Saraswat" text as there was dislike of the Gaud Saraswats of the west coast of India by the Deshasthas as well as the fact that the Deshastha, Chitpavans and Karhade Brahmin unanimously rejected the Brahmin status claim of the Gaud Saraswat Brahmins (Shenvi) of the western coast of Maharashtra. The Kulavruttanta of the Khare (Chitpavan) family prefers a modified version of the scripture. They state that fourteen dead-bodies were purified by Parshurama. Since "Chiplun pleased Paraśurāma's heart", the Brahmins of that place received the name cittapāvana.

The Chitpavan story of shipwrecked people is similar to the legendary arrival of Bene Israel Jews in the Raigad district. According to the historian Roshen Dalal, similarities between the legends may be due to a connection between the Chitpavans and the Bene Israel communities. The Bene Israel, who also settled in Konkan, claim that the Chitpavans are also of Jewish origin. According to their version, these Jews later adopted Hinduism and later were called Chitpavans by the people in the area. A member of the community, B.J Israel, noted that there might be truth in his community's claim that they and Chitpavans belong to the same stock but there is also a possibility that the Puranic legend of Chitpavan origin had been appropriated by his community to account for their presence on the coast. Yulia Egorova notes that the attempts of Bene-Israel, whose lifestyle was closer to Agriss, but "showed an interest in being associated with" Chitpavan Brahmins who were high locally is similar to the concept of Sanskritisation in which low caste Hindus try to elevate their status. Oroon.K.Ghosh believes that the Chitpavans themselves were Sanskritized into Brahminhood under the rule of the Satavahana dynasty.

Historian Jadunath Sarkar opines that the Chitpavans had a non-Indian origin and bases his views on traditions and inscriptions. Indologist Johannes Bronkhorst writes that there is a belief that Chitpavans are sometimes considered to be people of non-Indian origin who later became Brahmins. Historian O'Hanlon states that there are allegations that Chitpavan are progeny of Arab sailors, and their historic practice of taking bride price was at odds with the standard practice of Kanyadana, or giving a daughter away. Maureen L. P. Patterson writes that the Konkan region witnessed the immigration of groups, such as the Bene Israel, Parsis, Kudaldeshkar Gaud Brahmins, Gaud Saraswat Brahmins, and Chitpavan Brahmins. Each of these arrived at different time, they settled in different parts of the region and there was little mingling between them. The Chitpavans were apparently the last major community to arrive there and consequently the area in which they settled, around Ratnagiri, was the least fertile and had few good ports for trading.

In ancient times, the Chitpavans were employed as messengers and spies. Later, with the rise of the Chitpavan Peshwa in the 18th century they began migrating to Pune and found employment as military men, diplomats and clerks in the Peshwa administration. A 1763–64 document shows that at least 67% of the clerks at the time were Chitpavans.

== History ==
=== Rise during the Maratha rule ===
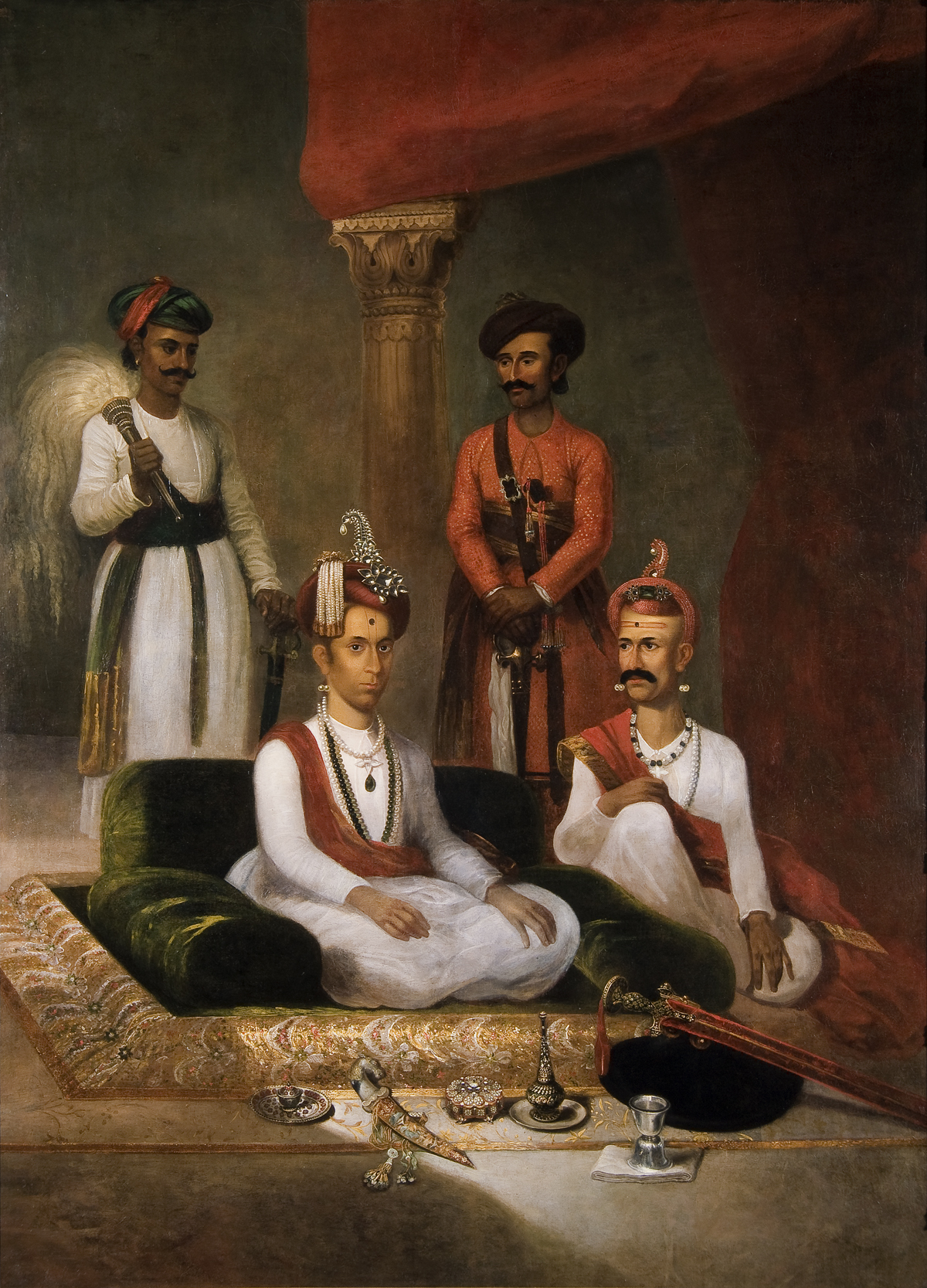
Peshwa Madhavrao II with Nana Fadnavis and attendants, at Pune in 1792

Very little is known of the Chitpavans before 1707 CE Balaji Vishwanth Bhat, a Chitpavan arrived from Ratnagiri to the Pune-Satara area. He was brought there on the basis of his reputation of being an efficient administrator. He quickly gained the attention of Chhatrapati Shahu. Balaji's work so pleased the Chhatrapati that he was appointed the Peshwa or Prime Minister in 1713. He ran a well-organised administration and, by the time of his death in 1720, he had laid the groundwork for the expansion of the Maratha Empire. Since this time until the fall of the Maratha Empire, the seat of the Peshwa would be held by the members of the Bhat family.

With the ascension of Balaji Baji Rao and his family to the supreme authority of the Maratha Empire, Chitpavan immigrants began arriving en masse from the Konkan to Pune where the Peshwa offered all important offices to his fellow caste members. The Chitpavan kin were rewarded with tax relief and grants of land. In 1762-63, Azad Bilgrami wrote:

The Marathas in general, but the Deccani Brahmans in particular, have the desire to deprive all people of their means of livelihood and appropriate it for themselves. They do not spare the zamindārs of rājas, nor even the zamindāri of small people like headmen and village accountants. Uprooting most cruelly the heirs of ancient lineages, they establish their own possession and desire that the Konkani Brahmans should become the proprietors (mālik) of the whole world.

On the other hand, Mahars were subjected to degradation during the rule of the Peshwas, who treated them as untouchables. Historians cite nepotism and corruption as causes of the fall of the Maratha Empire in 1818. Richard Maxwell Eaton states that this rise of the Chitpavans is a classic example of social rank rising with political fortune.

=== British Era ===
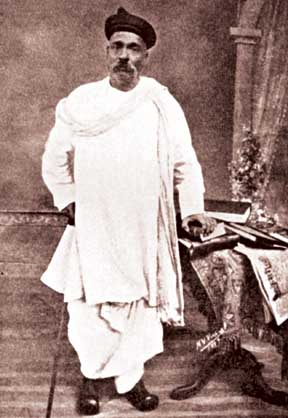
Bal Gangadhar Tilak

After the fall of the Maratha Empire in 1818, the Chitpavans lost their political dominance to the British. The British would not subsidise the Chitpavans on the same scale that their caste-fellow, the Peshwas, had done in the past. Pay and power was now significantly reduced. Poorer Chitpavan students adapted and started learning English because of better opportunities in the British administration. As per the 1901 census, about 5% of the Pune population was Brahmin and about 27% of them were Chitpavans.

Some of the prominent figures in the Hindu reform movements of the 19th and 20th centuries came from the Chitpavan Brahmin community. These included Dhondo Keshav Karve, Justice Mahadev Govind Ranade, Vinayak Damodar Savarkar, Gopal Ganesh Agarkar, Vinoba Bhave.

Some of the strongest resistance to change came from the very same community. The vanguard and the old guard clashed many times. D. K. Karve was ostracised. Even Tilak offered penance for breaking caste or religious rules. One was for taking tea at Poona Christian mission in 1892 and the second was going to England in 1919.

When the social reformer Jyotirao Phule was trying to get the backward castes educated, historian Umesh Chattopadhyaya says that "Pune's Chitpavans would not allow any Dalit and backward to join schools". This opposition from them resulted in Phule establishing schools in and around Pune.

The Chitpavan community includes two major politicians in the Gandhian tradition: Gopal Krishna Gokhale, whom Mahatma Gandhi acknowledged as a preceptor, and Vinoba Bhave, one of his outstanding disciples. Gandhi describes Bhave as the "jewel of his disciples", and recognised Gokhale as his political guru. However, strong opposition to Gandhi came from the Chitpavan community. Vinayak Damodar Savarkar, the founder of the Hindu nationalist political ideology Hindutva, was a Chitpavan Brahmin and several other Chitpavans were among the first to embrace it because they thought it was a logical extension of the legacy of the Peshwas and caste-fellow Tilak. These Chitpavans felt out of place with the Indian social reform movement of Phule and the mass politics of Gandhi. Large numbers of the community looked to Savarkar, the Hindu Mahasabha and finally the RSS, drew their inspiration from fringe groups.

=== Anti-Brahmin violence in the 20th century ===
After Mahatma Gandhi's assassination by Nathuram Godse, a Chitpavan, Brahmins in Maharashtra, became targets of violence, mostly by the Maratha caste members.

V. M. Sirsikar, a political scientist at the University of Pune, noted that

It will be too much to believe that the riots took place because of the intense love of Gandhiji on the part of the Marathas. Godse became a very convenient hate symbol to damn the Brahmins and burn their properties.

The violence after the assassination affected Chitpavan Patwardhan family ruled princely states such as Sangli, where the Marathas were joined by the Jains and the Lingayats in the attacks against the Brahmins. Here, specifically, the loss was about ₹16 million. This event led to the hasty integration of the Patwardhan states into the Bombay Province by March 1948 – a move that was opposed by other Brahmins as they feared the Maratha predominance in the integrated province.

== Military ==
The Chitpavans have considered themselves to be both warriors and priests. Their involvement in military affairs began with the rise of the Peshwas and their willingness to enter military and other services earned them high status and power in the Deccan.

== Culture ==
In their original home of Konkan, their primary occupation was farming, while some earned money by performing rituals among their own caste members.

Anthropologist Donald Kurtz writes that the late 20th century opinions about the culture of the Chitpavans was that they were frugal to the point of appearing cheap, impassive, not trustworthy and also conspiratorial. According to Tilak, a Chitpavan himself, his community was known for cleanliness and being industrious but he suggested they should learn virtues such as benevolence and generosity from the Deshasthas. During the heyday of the Maratha Empire, the city of Pune became the financial metropolis of the empire with 150 big and petty moneylenders. Most of these were Chitpavan or Deshastha Brahmins.

D.L.Sheth, the former director of the Center for the Study of Developing Societies in India (CSDS), lists Indian communities that were traditionally "urban and professional" (following professions like doctors, lawyers, teachers, engineers, etc.) immediately after Independence in 1947. This list included Chitpavans and CKPs(Chandraseniya Kayastha Prabhus) from Maharashtra; the South Indian Brahmins; the Nagar Brahmins from Gujarat; the Punjabi Khatris, Kashmiri Pandits and Kayasthas from northern India; the Probasi and the Bhadralok Bengalis; the Parsis and the upper crusts of Muslim and Christian communities. According to P.K.Verma, "Education was a common thread that bound together this pan Indian elite" and almost all male members of these communities could read and write English and were educated beyond school.

=== Language ===
Chitpavan Brahmins in Maharashtra speak Marathi as their language. The Marathi spoken by Chitpavans in Pune is the standard form of language used all over Maharashtra today. This form has many words derived from Sanskrit and retains the Sanskrit pronunciation of many, misconstrued by non-standard speakers as "nasalised pronunciation".

=== Social status ===
Earlier, the Deshastha Brahmins openly disparaged the Chitpavans as parvenus (a relative newcomer to a socio-economic class), and in Kumar's words "barely fit to associate on terms of equality with the noblest of the Dvijas". The Deshastha Brahmins were also joined by the Karhade Brahmins who also showed disdain for the Chitpawans and both these castes even declined to eat food together with them. Thus, they did not treat them as social equals. Even the Peshwas themselves were not given access to the ghats reserved for Deshastha priests at Nashik on the Godavari river.

After the appointment of Balaji Vishwanath Bhat as Peshwa, Kokanastha Brahmin migrants began arriving en masse from the Konkan to Pune, where the Peshwa offered some important offices to the Kokanastha Brahmin caste. The Kokanastha Brahmin kin were rewarded with tax relief and grants of land. Historians point out nepotism and corruption during this time.

The rise in prominence of the Chitpavans compared to the Deshastha Brahmins resulted in intense rivalry between the two communities. 19th century records also mention Gramanyas or village-level debates between the Chandraseniya Kayastha Prabhus and the Chitpavans, Saraswat Brahmins and the Chitpavans, Pathare Prabhus and the Chitpavans and Shukla Yajurvedi Deshastha Brahmins and the Chitpavans. These disputes pertaining to the so-called violation of "Brahmanical ritual code of behavior" were quite common in Maharashtra during that period.

Bal Gangadhar Tilak believed that the Deshasthas, Chitpavans and Karhades should get united. As early as 1881, he encouraged this by writing comprehensive discussions on the urgent need for these three Maharashtrian Brahmin sub-castes to give up caste exclusiveness by intermarrying and dining together.

Starting in the 20th century, the relations between the Deshastha Brahmins and the Chitpavan Brahmins have improved by the large-scale mixing of both communities on social, financial and educational fields, as well as with intermarriages.

=== Diet ===
Traditionally, Chitpavan Brahmins are vegetarian. Rice was historically their staple food.

=== Bodan ===
A.J. Agarkar describes Bodan as follows and adds that some kind of dancing is also involved:

In certain Chitpavan families, it is obligatory to perform bodan, after a birth or a marriage has taken place in the family. Four married women and an unmarried girl are invited to meals. A metal idol of the Goddess Annapurna is placed in a plate containing all the items of the meals in small quantities. All the contents of the plate along with the idol are mixed together by the invited women and if any of them is in the habit of getting possessed on such occasions, or if anyone gets possessed for the first time, ghee, milk, honey, etc. are added to the mixture according to her instructions. The idol is afterwards removed and the mixture is fed to a cow.

Vandana Bhave has published the only dedicated book on Bodan Vidhi (Bodan method) named Merutantrokta Bodan Vidhi.

Bodan finds mention in the Akshi Shilalekh (Pillar Inscription), dated to 1012 CE (sake 934) by Dr. S. G. Tulpule, and by Dikshit to 1209-1210 CE (Sake 1132). V. V. Mirashi agrees with Sake 1132 as the right date. Tulpule reads the content as donation of 9 kuvalis of grain towards Goddess Mahalakshmi for Bodan, whereas Dikshit interprets it as digging a well to honor Mahalaskhmi.

=== Genealogy ===
The community has published several family history and genealogy almanacs called Kulavruttantas. These books usually document various aspects of a clan's history, name etymology, ancestral land holdings, migration maps, religious traditions, genealogical charts, biographies, and records of births, deaths and marriages within the clan.

== See also ==
- Deshastha Brahmin
- Karhade Brahmin
- Limaye
- Maharashtrian Brahmin
