= Limaye =

Limaye is a family name, common among the Chitpavan Kokanastha Brahmin community in Kokan, Maharashtra, India. The names Karandikar, Dixit and Khasgiwale are supposedly derived from the same clan. The origin of the Limaye/Karandikar/Dixit and Khasgiwale family is believed to be from the Western Coast of India, Maharashtra - Ratnagiri, a Southern District of Konkan - Maharashtra region.

The Kul Daivat (family deity) of this clan is Lakshmi-Keshav situated at Karle, a small village near Ratnagiri. The Kula Devata (female deity) of this family is "Amba Jogai" situated in Central- Eastern Maharashtra- India. The gotra of people named Limaye - Karandikar - Dixit or Khasgiwale is Kapi. This group of people is said to belong to the Chitpawan Kokanasth

In the past, several Limayes were royalty in the Maratha court. The Limaye family maintains an intergenerational history book, the Limaye Kulavrittanta. It is published regularly in Marathi using the Devnagiri script.

The Chitpavan Brahmins story of shipwrecked people is similar to the legendary arrival of Bene Israel Jews in the Raigad district. The word "Limaye" actually means "a sailor" in Hebrew "לימאי", which could lend credence to this hypothesis.
