= Narayan Dinanath Velkar =

Social reformer (1798–1870)

Raobahadur Narayan Dinanath Velkar
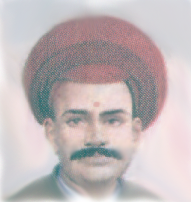
- Portrait of Narayan Dinanath Velkar
- Born: 1798; Bombay, British India
- Died: 17 May 1870 (aged 71–72)
- Education: Elphinstone Institution
- Occupations: Social reformer, publisher
- Known for: Founding the Central Library at Town Hall, Framji Cowasjee Institute, Bombay Association
- Notable work: The Present State of Gujarathis and The Marathas Compared

Raobahadur Narayan Dinanath Velkar (also known as N. D. Velkar) (1798–1870) was a 19th-century social reformer and civic leader from Bombay. He is known for his contributions to the city's intellectual and civic life and he was instrumental in establishing key institutions such as the Central Library at Town Hall and the Framji Cowasjee Institute. As one of the owners of the Bombay Times, which later became The Times of India. He was the first Indian Municipal Commissioner for Bombay's welfare in 1840.

== Early life ==
He belonged to the first graduating class of the Elphinstone Institution, a prestigious educational institution established by the British. His contemporaries included notable figures such as Bhau Daji Lad, Dadabhoy Naoroji, Nowroj Fardoonji, Nana Moroji Trilokekar, Dadoba Pandurang Turkhud and Ramchandra Balkrishna Jayakar. He hailed from the Pathare Prabhu community.

== Work ==
In 1840, Velkar became the chief translator and interpreter at the Bombay High Court. He participated in the city's social and intellectual life, founding several influential societies and institutions. Velkar was instrumental in founding the Central Library at Town Hall, which later became the Asiatic Library, and the Framji Cowasjee Institute at Dhobitalao. He also established the Dnyanprasarak Mandali and led its Marathi wing. He founded the Students Literary Society and the Scientific Society, which operated the Kamalabai School in Girgaon.

Velkar was one of the four original proprietors of the Bombay Times, which eventually evolved into The Times of India. His involvement in journalism impacted public opinion and the dissemination of information in Bombay.

Before the Bombay Municipal Corporation was established, the city was managed by the Bombay Conservancy, with two British Commissioners and one Native Commissioner. Narayan Dinanath Velkar was the first Native (Indian) Commissioner, who used to be called the Black Commissioner. He was an advocate for the city's civic infrastructure and environmental preservation. He had opposed a plan to remove palm trees at Backbay, predicting the adverse effects of urbanization.

He was the founding member of the Bombay Association, an organization that later influenced the creation of the Indian National Congress in 1887. He also authored a volume titled The Present State of Gujarathis and The Marathas Compared. He died on 17 May 1870.
