= Sakharam Hari Gupte =

Sakharam Hari Gupte Tipnis (19 September 1718- October 1779) was born in Chandraseniya Kayastha Prabhu (CKP) family, and was the commander and tipnis (secretary) of Peshwa Bajirao I. For few years he worked under Peshwa Nanasaheb and then became the General of Raghunathrao Peshwa. He was responsible for conquering Attock on the banks of the Indus and repelling the Durrani ruler, Ahmad Shah Abdali out of India in the 1750s.

== Campaigns with Peshwa Bajirao I ==
At the age of 17 years, Sakharam Hari Gupte joined the army of Peshwa Bajirao I alongside his brother Baburao Gupte. In 1735, when he joined the Peshwa's army, during the battle against "Siddhi Rahiman"; Sakharam Hari stood across him and killed him on the spot. As a felicitation gesture, Bajirao I gave him the same elephant used by Siddhi Rahiman and also made him the commander of a cavalry of 1200 horsemen.

During a crucial battle (1737-1738) between Peshwa Bajirao I and Nizam-ul-Mulk when the marathas found themselves in the lost position. Sakharam Hari Gupte faked a retreat and then surrounded a hill that was empty from both sides. He then attacked from there resulting in victory for the Peshwa and maratha army. Peshwa Bajirao I made him his tipnis (secretary) and till the time of his death, he assigned him various tasks to be fulfilled at Ajinkyatara.

== Rise to Power ==
During the reign of Peshwa Bajirao I, Sakharam Hari Gupte enjoyed respect at Chhatrapati Shahu's Ajinkyatara fort. Sakharam Hari Gupte was married to Avabai Rajapurkar a sister of Bhaskarrao Rajapurkar . Sakharam Hari Gupte had become very close to both Peshwa Bajirao's family namely to Chimaji Appasaheb and Nanasaheb as well as Chhatrapati Shahu. He had become a trusted name in the maratha royal circles.

== Fall from Power ==
After the death of Peshwa Madhavrao I, Nana Fadnavis and Gopikabai gained more power with the rise of next Peshwa, Narayanrao. Gopikabai and Nana Fadnavis instructed Narayanrao to lay restrictions on the CKP caste. Narayanrao, also insulted Sardar Gupte who had gone to his court on behalf of the Prabhu caste to void the restrictions. Later, Tuloji Pawar, Sakharam Bapu Bokil and Raghunathrao hatched the plot to kill Narayanrao. Sardar Gupte was also accused of the same.

Few months after the death of Narayanrao, Nana Fadnavis offered Sakharam Bapu Bokil to join the Barbai financial council. He accepted the offer. But restrictions on Sardar Gupte and his family as well as the prabhus of Pen were continued. After, Gopikabai's death in Nashik, Sardar Gupte was arrested by deception.

His daughter and son were also arrested, exact time is not known. They were put in Dhangad fort's dungeon in Ahmednagar. Fourteen months, Sardar Gupte was kept in the arrest and a sum of Rs.12000 along with jewellery were collected from his wife Avaibai Gupte. His daughter and son were then released but Sardar Gupte was not released despite the agreement with Avaibai.
