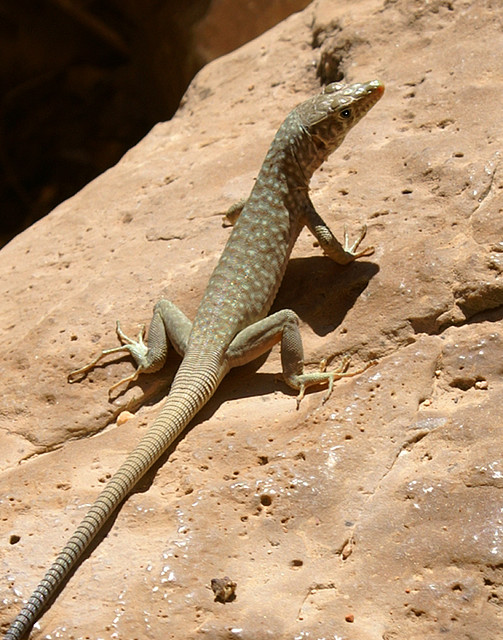
- Omanosaura jayakari

Scientific classification
- Kingdom: Animalia
- Phylum: Chordata
- Class: Reptilia
- Order: Squamata
- Family: Lacertidae
- Subfamily: Lacertinae
- Genus: Omanosaura; D. Lutz, Bischoff & Mayer, 1986

Species
- Two, see text.

= Omanosaura =

Genus of lizards

Omanosaura is a genus of lizards in the family Lacertidae. The genus is native to the eastern end of the Arabian Peninsula. There are two recognized species.

== Species ==
The following two species are recognized as being valid.

- Omanosaura cyanura (Arnold, 1972) — blue-tailed lizard, blue-tailed Oman lizard
- Omanosaura jayakari (Boulenger, 1887) — Jayakar lizard, Jayakar's lizard, Jayakar's Oman lizard
