= Atmaram Sadashiv Jayakar =

Indian naturalist, military physician and surgeon (1844–1911)

- Born: 1844
- Died: 1911, aged 67
- Military career
- Allegiance: British Empire
- Branch: Indian Medical Service
- Rank: Lieutenant colonel

Atmaram Sadashiv Grandin/Grovindin Jayakar (1844–1911), known also as Muscati, was an Indian naturalist, military physician, and colonial administrator in the British Empire. Jayakar, who was of Marathi Pathare Prabhu origin, began his studies in India where he earned his Bachelors of Medicine and Surgery, and then went to England to complete his medical studies. Later, he returned to India to work in the Indian Medical Service, in which he ultimately achieved the rank of lieutenant colonel. In 1873, he was sent by the British Empire to the Sultanate of Muscat and Oman (an Arab country that was under a British protectorate) to deal with the health of the people of Muscat, in which capacity he also served as a personal physician to Sultan Turki bin Said. He was the acting political agent from 2 March 1889 to 30 March 1889, and again from 29 March 1890 to 30 November 1890, and the acting consul from 14 October 1891 to 27 November 1892, again from 19 April 1895 to 22 May 1895, and yet again from 12 June 1897 to 15 September 1897.

Stationed in Oman, he then began to take an interest in animal life, and for nearly thirty years studied and identified many species, including a species of tahr which now bears his name, Arabitragus jayakari, as well as twenty-two new species of fishes (including the eponymous Hippocampus jayakari), two species of snakes (including the eponymous Eryx jayakari), as well as lizards (including the eponymous Omanosaura jayakari) and invertebrates (including the eponymous Hottentotta jayakari). He also made contributions to linguistics, contributing a two-part grammatical sketch and lexicon of Omani Arabic, "The O'mánee Dialect of Arabic", to the Journal of the Royal Asiatic Society in 1889, and a grammatical sketch of Shihhi Arabic, "The Shahee dialect of Arabic", to The Journal of the Bombay Branch of the Royal Asiatic Society in 1904, as well as a collection titled Omani Proverbs in 1900 (published posthumously as a book in 1987). He also contributed to Indian government publications with medical reports such as a "Medical Topography of Muscat" in 1877, and a "Report on the Recent Epidemic of Cholera in Maskat and Matrah" in 1900.
