= Michael Hadow =

British diplomat

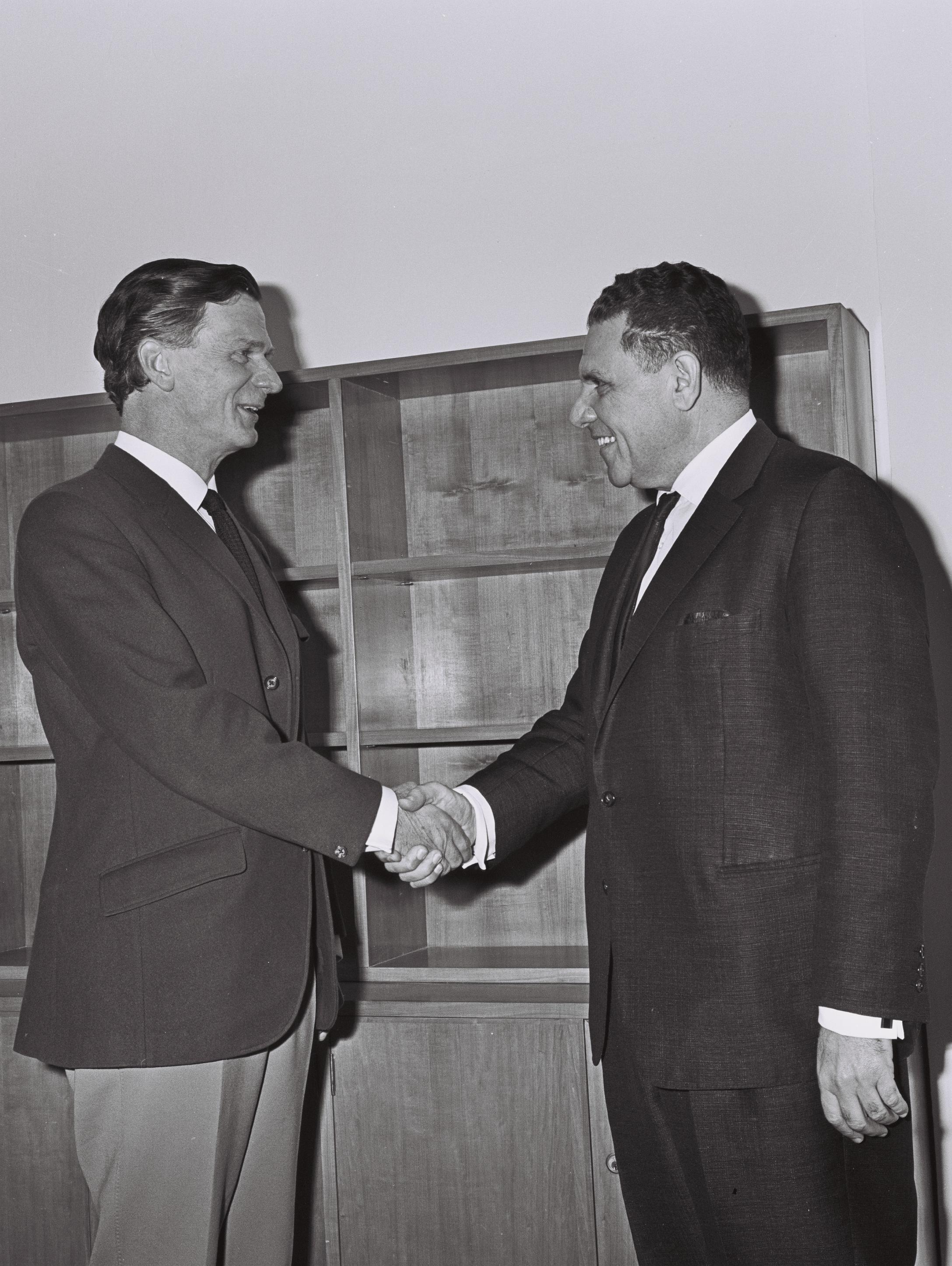
Michael Hadow, British Ambassador to Israel, with Minister Haim Yosef Zadok, 1966

Sir Michael Hadow KCMG (17 August 1915 – 22 December 1993) was a British diplomat who served as the ambassador to Israel from 1965 to 1969, and as ambassador to Argentina from 1969 to 1972.

== Early life ==
Michael Hadow was born in Chittagong, British Raj, on 17 August 1915, to Malcolm McGregor Hadow and Constance Lund. The first language Hadow learned was Khasi. He went to the United Kingdom in 1921. He was educated at the Berkhamsted School. He entered King's College, Cambridge and graduated in 1937 with a degree in modern languages.

== Career ==
Hadow started working for the Indian Civil Service in 1937.

Hadow was the private secretary to the British ambassador to the Soviet Union from 1942 to 1945. He was undersecretary of the External Affairs Department in Delhi from 1946 to 1947. He worked at the Foreign Office from 1948 to 1952, and as private secretary of the Minister of State from 1949 to 1952.

Hadow was the head of chancery in Mexico City from 1952 to 1954. He was a counsellor at the British Embassy in Paris from 1959 to 1962. He was the head of the News Department in the Foreign Office from 1962 to 1965.

Hadow was the British political agent to the Trucial States. He served as the British ambassador to Israel from 1965 to 1969. He was the British ambassador to Argentina from 1969 to 1972.

== Personal life ==
The Order of St Michael and St George (CMG) was given to Hadow in 1962, and he was promoted to knight in the order (KCMG) in 1971.

Hadow married Daphne Sieff in 1972, and she died in 1988. Hadow died on 22 December 1993.

== Works cited ==
=== News ===
- Campbell, Alan (18 January 1994). "Obituary: Sir Michael Hadow". The Independent. Archived from the original on 21 November 2026.

=== Web ===
- "IOR/R/15/2/1486". British Library. Archived from the original on 21 November 2026.
- Hadow, Michael (1970). "Memoir of the Career of Sir Reginald Michael Hadow". British Library. Archived from the original on 21 November 2026.
