= Girish Prabhu =

Indian musician

Girish Prabhu is an Indian composer, singer, and songwriter. He was awarded the title of Breakthrough Artist by World Space Radio for his debut album Zubaani in 2007. He is known for his albums Zubaani, Lamhein, Out of the blue, Begaane, Baanaadi, Nanhi Pari, Chhori and Banke Toofan.

His music career started when he joined a Hindi rock band in college band and later formed his own band in which he was the lead vocalist. The band later produced a song for a Hindi film, which ended up being shelved.

== Discography ==
- Zubaani (2007)
- Lamhein (2016)
- Out of the blue (2016)
- Begaane (2019)
- Baanaadi (2019)
- Nanhi Pari (2021)
- Chhori (2023)
- Banke Toofan (2023)

== Awards and recognition ==
- Awarded the Title of ‘’Breakthrough Artist’’ by World Space Radio in 2007
