= Pathare Prabhu (Kanchole) =

Indian caste

The Pathare Prabhu Kanchole caste is one of the two sections of the original Pathare Prabhu caste of Mumbai. The Pathare Prabhus had settled in Mumbai, and the region thereabout in the 13th century, and gained prosperity during the development of Bombay by the British in the 18th century. The Pathare Prabhu Kancholes are a few hundred in number, and this section came into existence, within the major caste, in the year 1777, over a quarrel on the occasion of a marriage ceremony in the caste. This smaller section of the main caste is known as Kanchole Pathare Prabhus, as the dispute leading to the schism in the original caste had centred about a kanchole, i.e. a small vessel used for holding sandalwood paste for the purpose of anointing, in honour, the foreheads of guests.

== Division ==
The incident causing the split in the greater Pathare Prabhu caste occurred in the year 1777, when, during the marriage ceremony in the caste, a small boy assigned the job of anointing the guests' foreheads with sandalwood paste failed to do so in case of a one elderly guest. The guest took that delinquency on the part of the boy as a deliberate attempt of insult, and cursed outrageously at the boy, on which the boy, out of boyish rage, threw away the kanchole in hand, which, by accident, struck another guest. In the ensuing mayhem different members of the community took either the side of the boy, or the side against him. The side against the boy being larger in number decided, on the spot, in the heat of the moment, to sever the relations with the boy-supporting smaller group.

The estrangement between the two groups only grew as the time passed, and due to their separation from the bigger community the smaller faction was unable to arrange suitable marriages for its members for the next 60 years, because of which its number shrank to the 300 from the original 400. Thereafter this "Kanchole" faction imperatively had to scatter in the nearby regions, marrying with the women from the other Suryavanshi and Somvanshi castes of Mumbai, and nearby areas. The smaller group had no qualm in retaining their original culture, customs, festivals and food habits, family goddess, and gotra, which they have been retaining till date.

Both the Kancholes and the non-Kancholes consider themselves to be the true Pathare Prabhus, as each of the groups is a faction of the original community, which divided on the pretext of a quarrel in the marriage ceremony, wherein all the members of the caste were invited as per the custom of that time. In 1929 Sri Shankaracharya (Dr. Kurtkoti, was the Shankaracharya that time), in the role of the arbitrator that had assigned him by both the groups, had produced a written religious instruction in favour of the unification of both the groups. However, his instruction was turned down by the larger group out of impudence derived from the majority status held by them,. Although the larger group had previously used the Shankaracharya's rulings to counter their being labeled as Shudra by the Peshwas. The Kanchole faction's requests and appeals from 1824-1929, for bringing the relations within the community back to normal, were rejected by the larger group from time to time.

== Current situation ==
Currently the Pathare Prabhus Kancholes are numbering 800 to 1000, and this number consists of with the property owners, high ranked politician, businessmen and skilled professionals. The Kanchole faction does not claim, what they consider to be their justifiable right, to a 30% share in the community's property, which is being withheld by the larger Pathare Prabhu group from the time of the division, considering the Kancholes were 15% of the total number at the time of the division, and more than 50% of the withheld property has been disposed of by the larger group in the recent past. Due to small number the Kancholes continue to marry into the other Maharashtrian communities of the claimed Kshatriya lineage, including the larger group; so do the larger Pathare Prabhu group due to their depleting number.
