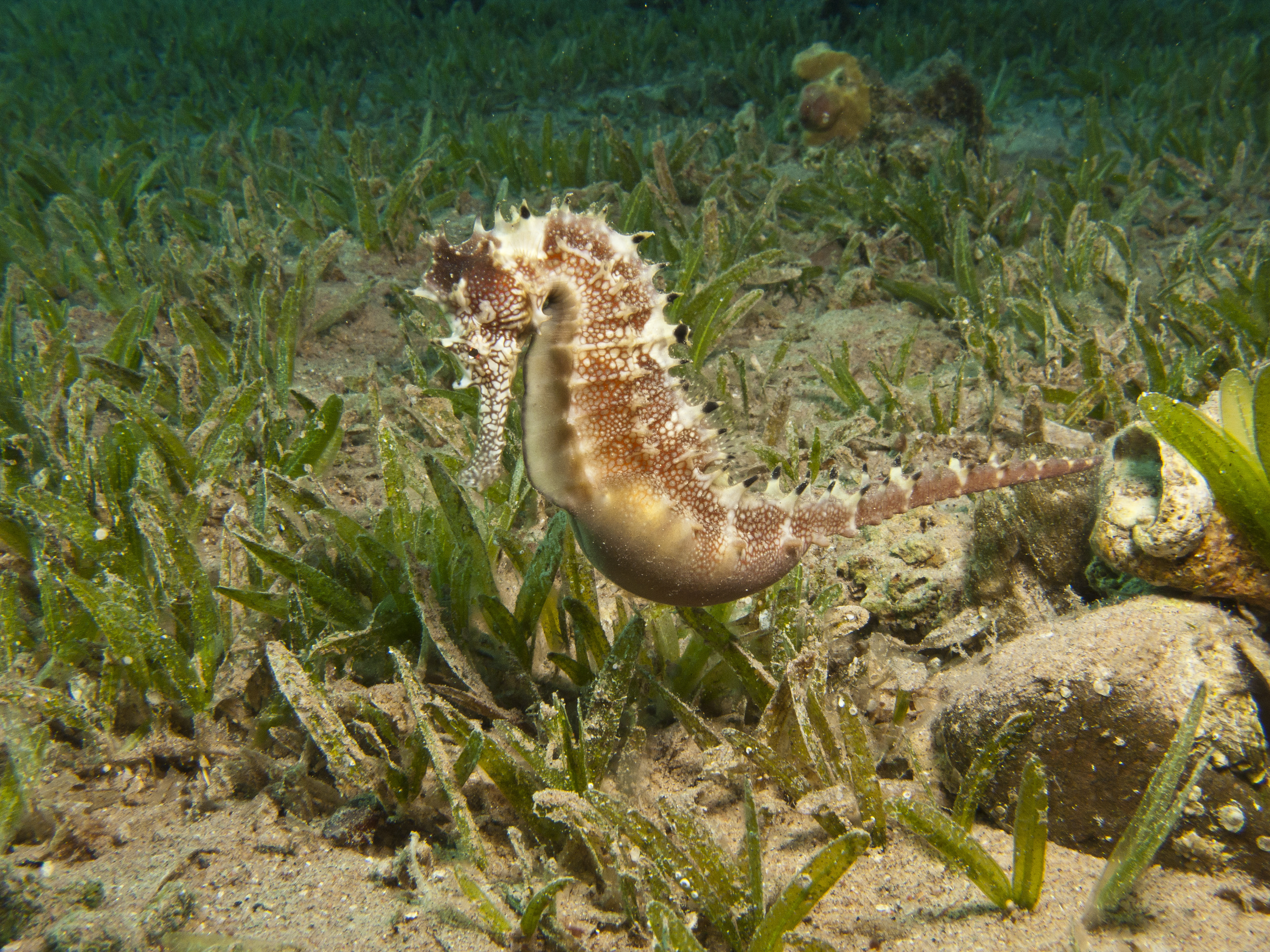

Conservation status
- Least Concern (IUCN 3.1)
- CITES Appendix II (CITES)

Scientific classification
- Kingdom: Animalia
- Phylum: Chordata
- Class: Actinopterygii
- Order: Syngnathiformes
- Family: Syngnathidae
- Genus: Hippocampus
- Species: H. jayakari

Binomial name
- Hippocampus jayakari Boulenger, 1900

= Jayakar's seahorse =

Species of fish

Jayakar's seahorse (Hippocampus jayakari) is a species of coastal fish of the family Syngnathidae. It is found in the Western Indian Ocean, from the Red and Arabian seas to the central coast of Pakistan. It lives in seagrass beds (such as Halophila spp.), algae, soft-bottom substrates, sponges, and rocky habitats, where it can grow to lengths of 14 centimetres (5.5 in). It can inhabit depths to 20 metres (66 ft), though it is more commonly found at 2–3 metres (6.6–9.8 ft). It is expected to feed on small crustaceans, similar to other seahorses. This species is ovoviviparous, with males carrying eggs in a brood pouch before giving birth to live young. Individuals reach sexual maturity at 11 centimetres (4.3 in). The specific name and the common name honours the Indian physician, linguist and ichthyologist Dr. Surgeon-Major Atmaram Sadashiv "Muscati" Jayakar (1844–1911).
