= Gaud Saraswat Brahmin =

Hindu Brahmin community in India and a part of the larger Saraswat Brahmin community

Regions with significant populations
- Primary populations in Karnataka, Goa, Maharashtra and Kerala

Languages
- Konkani

Religion
- Hinduism

Related ethnic groups
- Saraswat Brahmins, Roman Catholic Brahmins

Gaud Saraswat Brahmins (GSB) (also Goud or Gawd), also known as Shenvis, are a Hindu community of contested caste status and identity. They primarily speak Konkani and its various dialects as their mother tongue.

They claim to be Saraswat Brahmins who initially migrated to Konkan from Gaud, per Puranic accounts. Upon moving out of Goa during Portuguese occupation, their claims of Brahminhood were rejected both to the north of Goa, by the Deshastha, Chitpavan and Karhade Brahmins of Maharashtra, and to the south, by the Nambudiri Brahmins of Kerala.

The GSBs were traditionally traders and even as early as the 1400s they conducted commerce across the Indian Ocean. In the Maratha empire, they also served as administrators.

== Etymology ==
There are many interpretations on how the Gaud Saraswat Brahmins received the name "Gaud" and the information about it is scant.

Authors Jose Patrocinio De Souza and Alfred D'Cruz interpreters that the word Gauda or Goud may have been taken from Ghaggar, with Goud and Saraswat having the same meaning, that is an individual residing on the banks of river Saraswati.

Scholars write that "Shenvi" and "Gaud Saraswat Brahmin" are synonyms.

Historically, Jana Tschurenev states that the Shenvis were a community that claimed to be Brahmins.

== Classification ==
According to Ghurye, five hundred years ago Saraswats were mainly confined to the area around Goa.In the last three hundred years, they migrated south towards Mangalore and north towards Rajapur in present day Ratnagiri district, Alibag and further north. He identifies seven sub-castes among the Saraswats, namely Bardeshkar, Bhalawalikar, Kudaldeshkar, Lotlikar, Pednekar, Sashtikar and Shenvi-paiki. From early twentieth century there have been many initiatives by the different sub-castes to form a unified Saraswat caste but according to Frank O'Conlon (writing in 1974) these attempts failed. These initiatives however, did spur foundation of educational and commercial instituitions which have endured.

== History ==
In Kalhana's Rajatarangini (twelfth century CE), the Saraswats are mentioned as one of the five Pancha Gauda Brahmin communities residing to the north of the Vindhyas.

References to Saraswat names are found in Shilaharas as well as Kadamba copper plate inscriptions. The inscriptions found in Goa bear testimony to the arrival of Brahmin families in the Konkan region.

The Shilahara kings seem to have invited supposedly pure Aryan Brahmins and Kshatriyas from the Indo-Gangetic Plain to settle in Konkan. These castes are the Gaud Saraswat Brahmins and Chandraseniya Kayastha Prabhus (CKP).

The GSB ancestors identified themselves as of the Saraswat section of the northern Gaud division, in contrast to their Maharashtra and Karnataka Brahman neighbours of the southern division. Many Saraswats left Goa after the invasion of Malik Kafur to the neighbouring regions and during the period of religious persecution of the Portuguese also Saraswats migrated to Uttar Kannada, Udupi, Dakshina Kannada, Kerala and South Konkan.

Historian Farias states that the Gaud Saraswats supposedly intermarried with women from other castes after their arrival in Goa.

=== Historical occupations ===
After commercial activities in the Indian Ocean increased after the 1400s, Pius Malekandathil states that "many Indians, particularly the banyas, the Gowda Saraswat Brahmins began to move to different parts of this maritime space to conduct trade, where they eventually set up nucleus for Indian diasporas".

Harald Tambs-Lyche notes that trading communities such as the GSB, when dominating the merchants of Cochin, received exterritorial rights granted by the Dutch.

South Kanara is part of the Kanara coast from Goa to Kerala. In the sixteenth century, the increase and export of rice production here was brought about by the GSB, the Bunts and Billava coconut growers. The Gaud Saraswat Brahmin – which Marine Carrin and Lidia Guzy describe as a "Konkani speaking community of traders [who were] already established along the coast" now became the major rice exporters. The Bunts controlled the land while the GSB controlled the rice trade in the markets. Thus in South Kanara, the GSB were merchants by occupation and not priests who served in temples. The priestly as well as clerical function was performed by Shivalli Brahmins. This remains the case even in modern times although other castes have entered the trading occupations now.

During the Portuguese rule and later, they were again one of the main trading communities. They also served as "village – Kulkarnis, financiers, tax-farmers in the intra-Asian trade, and diplomatic agents". Many sources of government income in Goa, Konkan and elsewhere, including taxes on cloth and tobacco, were controlled by them. Some engaged with Tobacco trade with Brazil in the early eighteenth century.

In the mid-nineteenth century, in Portuguese India, the trade in Goa changed focus from luxury items to essential items only. Coconut, salt, areca-nuts, fruits and poultry were exported, while rice and timber were imported. According to Borges, Pereira and Stubbe, of the trading communities, the Gaud Saraswat Brahmins and Gujarati Vania played the major role in this trade and Mormugao city became the major meeting place for the traders. British and Portuguese interests clashed during this time.

In Maharashtra, Saraswats had served as administrators under the Deccan Sultanates such as the Adil Shahi. In the eighteenth century during the Maratha Empire era, the Shinde and the Holkar rulers of Ujjain and Indore recruited Saraswats to fill their administrative positions. R.C.Chaurasia says that Mahadji Shinde favoured the Shenvi Brahmins and Deshastha Brahmins. After Mahadji's death, his widows favoured the Shenvis to the Deshastha. Balloba Pagnis and Lakhwa Dada held high posts - Pagnis was a minister and Dada was a Viceroy.

A sample study in the 1970s in Kota, Karnataka found that the Gaud Saraswat Brahmins owned most of the grocery and general merchandise stores.

=== Origin myth per the Sahyadrikhanda ===
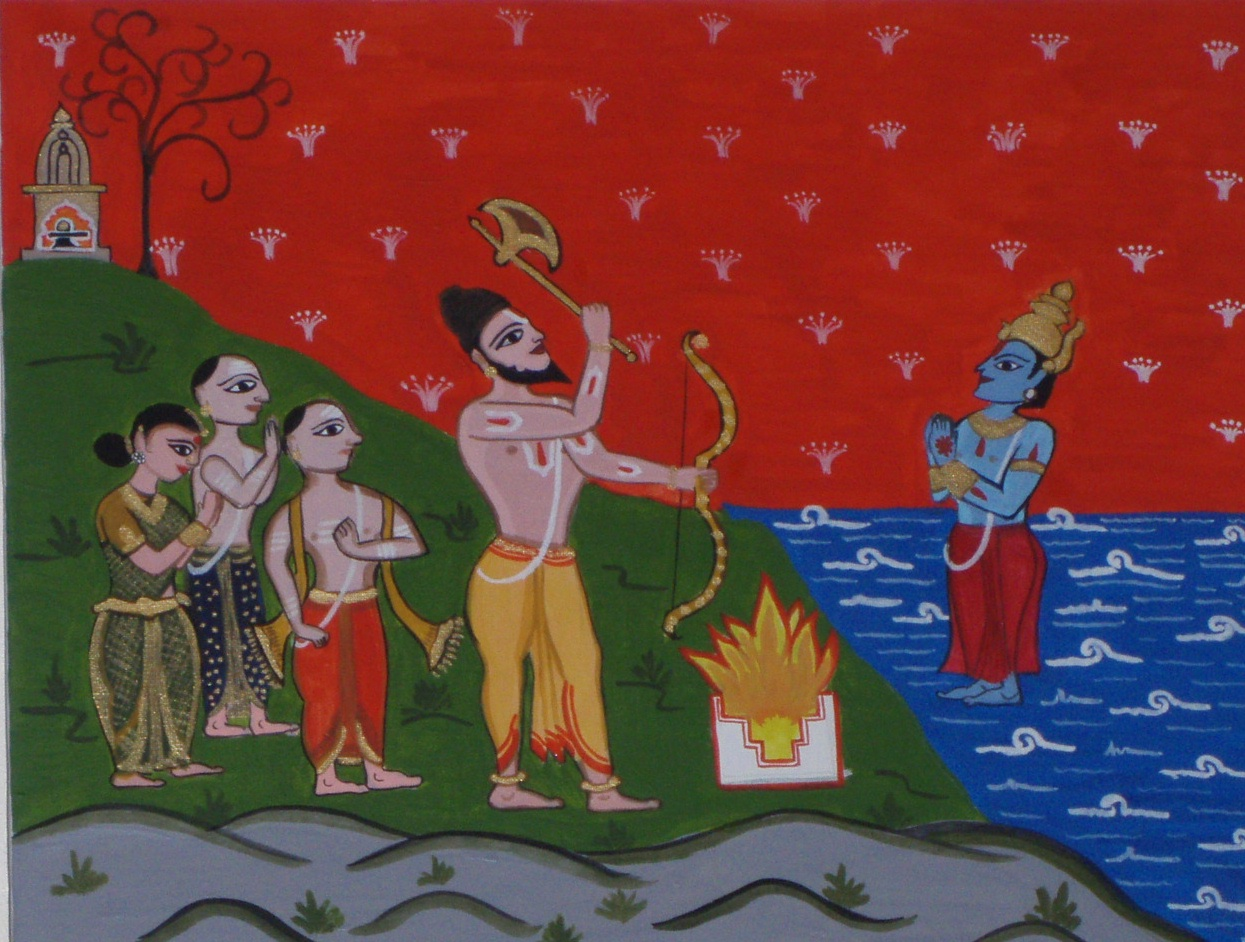
Parshurama with Saraswat Brahmin settlers, commanding Varuna to make the seas recede in order to create the Konkan Region

As per Sahyadrikhanda, "Chitpavan and Karhade brahmins are "new creations of base-origins" and not a part of "established Gaud or Dravid groups". After Parashuram created the Chitpawans from fishermen who had assembled around some funeral pyre in Konkan, their later actions displeased him. As if to rectify his mistake, Parashuram brought ten sages from northern India, specifically, Trihotra (Tirhut) and set them up in Goa for performing ancestral rites, fire sacrifice and dinner offerings. The fourth chapter of Sahyadrikhanda describes the Gotras of these Brahmins and praises them as "best brahmins, honored by the kings, good-looking, with righteous behavior, and expert in all rites".

The Gauḍa Sārasvat Brahmins from southern India, whose claim to Brahminhood was often not accepted by the surrounding Dravid Brahmins, could use this text from Sahyadrikhanda to address the conflict. Wagle makes no judgement on the validity of the claim of Northern origin and writes:

The claim of the Gauḍa Sārasvata brahmanas (= GSB), whether real or imagined, of a north Indian origin is not an obscure historical problem; it is a relevant problem which has been of constant interest to the GSB. Many GSB leaders in the 1870s and 1880s have referred to this northern origin to indicate the solidarity of the GSB in contrast with other brahmana groups of Maharashtra, Karnataka and Kerala. In the late 19th century the GSB spokesmen wrote books and articles, gave public speeches, cited documentary evidence in the native Indian as well as English court of law to prove that they belonged to the Northern stock of brahmanas. In this, their claim was in line with their efforts to be recognized as brahmanas, a right which was challenged by the Chitpavan, Deshastha and Karhade, among others.

In addition, as per some modern scholars like Hewitt, the Sahyadrikhanda is considered corrupted by many modifications and interpolations to the original. As an example, Madhav Deshpande cites the 4th verse from chapter-I which when translated is:

The Trihotras, the Āgnivaiśyas, the Kānyakubjas, the Kanojis, and the Maitrāyaṇas, these five are said to be the five Gauḍas.

Deshpande considers this as a "sloppy interpolation" to get Trihotra in the list of Brahmin migrations as the Gaud Saraswats group has migrated from Trihotra in northern India as per the text. There is a reference to Kānyakubja in this verse and Kanoji in the previous although they are the same.

==== Scholars' opinions ====
Bambardekar, a scholar on Konkan History, does not accept the Gauda or Brahmin claim of the Gauda Saraswats. According to Bambardekar, the Pancha Dravid Brahmins are the original Gauda Brahmins and he cites a verse from the Skanda Puran to prove his assertion.

Alexander Henn says that "modern scholars have questioned the myth of the northern descent". According to modern scholars, arguing that their origins instead come from local priests who, at some point in history, gained Brahmanhood".

=== Varna dispute ===
Gaud Saraswats of Goa during the long Portuguese rule have had their Brahmin claim challenged by the locally smaller brahmin communities of Deshastha, Chitpavan and Karhade as well as by the Goldsmith, Maratha, and other non-brahmin communities.

Sanjay Subrahmanyam says that in the 15th and 16th century Saraswats did business with the Portuguese at the port of Basrur. They claimed Brahminhood sometimes but were more associated with trading activity and referred to as "chatins" from the word chetti by the Portuguese. They were a "caste of open status" according to Subrahmanyam.

M.R. Kantak says that in 16th(1500s), Brahmins were the only caste that had access to higher education and learning in Sanskrit. Saraswats and Prabhus, who came next to the Brahmins, also educated their children and home, but only in accounting and vernacular literature. Apart from these three communities (Brahmins, Saraswats and Kayasthas), other communities did not receive much education as during those times only higher castes received education. Kantak does not consider the Saraswats in the Brahmin category.

The brahmin status of the Saraswats was affirmed by the Kashi pandits in 1630. (Note: After the Portuguese rulers had destroyed the Math (monastery) of the community, the community wanted to continue the math in Kashi with a Saraswat Sanyasi as the head. Previously in Goa, the Math head had always been a sanyasi from other brahmin communities. In order for a Saraswat sanyasi to head the math, a petition was made to the Kashi pandits. The pandits with Dadam Bhatta as their chief issued their judgement in 1630 granting the saraswats, a brahmin status which allowed them to set up the Kashi math with a saraswat sanyasi as their head)

Later in the 17th century, Shivaji (1630-1680) had asked Gaga Bhatt, a Benares based Deshastha Brahmin pandit, to resolve the issue regarding the Shenavis' ritual status when they met before his coronation. Fifteen pandits in Benares proclaimed that the Shenavis were Brahmins. This proclamation includes Prashasti (praise) from both Shivaji and his father, Shahaji for the verdict. However, there was a debate in Shivaji's court in 1664, which reached the consensus that they were not "full-fledged Brahmins" but only trikarmi brahmins who do not have the full rights of a Brahmin. A late 20th century study showed that Konkani communities - Shenvis, Sastikars, Bardeshkars, Bhalvalikars, Rajpurkars and Pednekars currently have trikarmi status only.

M.R. Kantak, while discussing the contributions of castes during Shivaji's rule in the 17th century, says that their education made the Saraswats and Prabhus proficient in account keeping as well as clerical posts in the administration as against the Brahmins who studied Sanskrit for religious literature also. Saraswats and Shenavis were acquainted with Portuguese and English languages, and therefore could act as interpreters during Shivaji's time.

During the census of 1846 carried out by the british colonial authorities in Bombay presidency, the ongoing feud between the Chitpavans and the Shenvis led to the latter being classified separately from the "Brahmans".

Madhav Deshpande writes:

The Deshastha, Chitpavan and Karhade were united in their rejection of the brahminhood for the Gauḍa Saraswats, and Wagle (Note: a scholar cited for paper on the History and Social Organization of the Gauḍa Sārasvata Brāhmanas of the West Coast of India) himself provides evidence of this animosity. (Note: Although the quote uses the word 'saraswat', the context of the paper shows that he refers to Gaud Saraswat only and the source referred by the source for the cases is The History and Social Organization of the Gauḍa Sārasvata Brāhmanas of the West Coast of India(1970) by Wagle)

Bambardekar, a prominent researcher on Konkan's history, also rejects the Brahmin claim of the Shenvi GSB as well as their "gauda-ness". He argues that the Seṇavīs adopted the term Gauḍa-Sārasvata in the latter part of the nineteenth century. According to Bambardekar, the (Shenvi)GSBs have falsified the Kannada word gowḍa meaning 'village chief' as being identical with the Sanskrit word gauḍa and challenges their Brahmin status itself. Bambardekar cites a document from 1694 AD and another from 1863 AD in which the Brahmins and Shenvis are separately listed. University of Michigan scholar Madhav M. Deshpande cites R.V.Parulekar and states that " British administrative documents from the early nineteenth century Maharashtra always list brahmins and Shenvis as two separate castes". Irawati Karve and G. S. Ghurye consider GSB's as part of larger Saraswat Brahmins and overall Brahmin community. The Hindu scripture Sahayadhri Khanda provided support for the Brahmanical genealogy of the GSB. However, Sanskrit scholar Madhav Deshpande, Indologist and Sanskrit Scholar Stephan Hillyer Levitt and historian O'Hanlon consider the portion of the Sahyādrikhaṇḍa that describes Saraswats to be corrupted and recently interpolated by Saraswats themselves in order to improve their status.

In Kerala, the Gaud Saraswat Brahmin claim to be Brahmins but this view is not necessarily supported by other communities such as the Namboodri Brahmins.

The GSB from Goa were considered to be non-Brahmin by the Pune Brahmin Shastris of late 1800s and therefore did not allow, RG Bhandarkar, an eminent orientalist and Sanskrit scholar to participate in a Brahmin only debate (Note: The debate was by the learned Brahmins was on the issue of Brahmin widow remarriage) in the British era as he was a GSB and not a Brahmin. This caused GSB caste activists to claim the Brahmin status by using markers such as "gotra", "kuldeva", village, "allegiance to a lineage of spiritual descent" or "guru parampara" of preceptors (swamis). The movement was active from the late 19th century to the early 20th century.

Gail Omvedt, while describing the non-Brahman movement in western India, says that Shahu, the ruler of Kolhapur, who encouraged non-Brahmins, sponsored hostels for almost all non-Brahmin communities. Omvedt ways that one of these was the Saraswat hostel.

Sociologist Sharmila Rege also considers the Saraswats(Shenvis) as different from Brahmins while discussing matriculation from Elphistone after the fall of the Peshwa rule.

In mid 19th century Bombay, the Pathare Prabhu and the GSB were both considered lower in ritual status in the varna system as compared to the Brahmins of Maharashtra although they had a high secular status. This ambiguous position caused the Prabhus and the GSBs to support Vishnubawa Brahmachari's Hindu revival in the 19th century.

Historian John Roberts also considers them as coming after the Brahmin community of Maharashtra in the jati hierarchy.

According to sociologist Dabir, ritually higher non-Brahmin castes in Maharashtra, the Saraswats and CKP, have tried to follow Brahmin customs in the treatment of women. She calls this process as Brahminisation.

Sociologist Ramesh Bairy says that "Saraswat claim to Brahminhood is still strongly under dispute, particularly in the coastal districts of Karnataka".

== Culture ==
=== Classification and culture ===
Gaud Saraswat Brahmins have both Madhvas and Smarthas among them. The Gaud Saraswats following Dvaita Vedanta of Madhvacharya are followers of Kashi Math and Gokarna Math, while the followers of Advaita Vedanta of Adi Shankara are followers of Kavale Math and Chitrapur Math. Among Gaud Saraswat Brahmins the Madhvas are Vaishnavites, while the Smarthas are considered as Shivites and Shaktites. According to author A B de Bragnanca Pereira says, "The main deities worshipped by Shaivite are Mangesh, Shantadurga, and Saptakoteshwar, while the Vaishnavites deities are Nagesh, Ramnath, Mahalakshmi, Mahalasa, Lakshmi, Narasimha, Venkataramana, Kamaksha, Bhagwati and Damodar". Most of the GSB's in the Malabar Coast, Karnataka, Kerala and Tamil Nadu regions are followers of Madhvacharya. In Goa, the GSB's who follow Madhvacharya and are mainly concentrated in the Bardez and Salcete regions.

=== Diet ===
Gaud Saraswat Brahmins are primarily fish and other seafood eaters but there are also vegetarians among them. Historian Kranti K Farias states that "Their main food is rice – called congi or Pej. Shaktas offer and then consume mutton, fowl and liquor during the worship of the female divine.

== See also ==
- List of Saraswats
- Saraswat cuisine
- Rajapur Saraswat Brahmins
- Chitrapur Saraswat Brahmin
- Kudaldeshkar Gaud Brahmins
