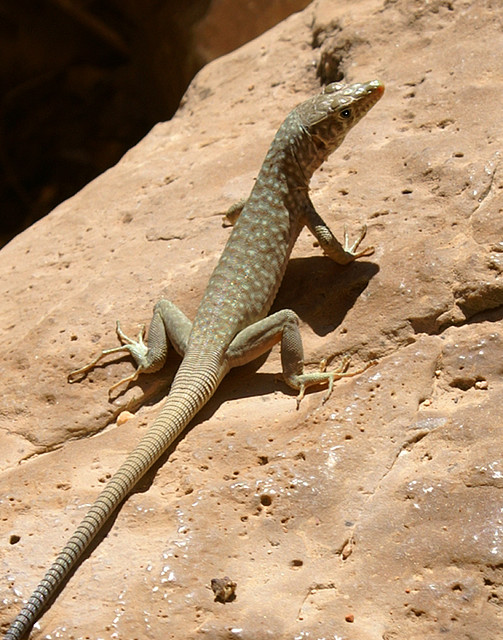

Conservation status
- Least Concern (IUCN 3.1)

Scientific classification
- Kingdom: Animalia
- Phylum: Chordata
- Class: Reptilia
- Order: Squamata
- Family: Lacertidae
- Genus: Omanosaura
- Species: O. jayakari

Binomial name
- Omanosaura jayakari (Boulenger, 1887)

Synonyms
- Lacerta jayakari Boulenger, 1887; Lacerta (Omanosaura) jayakari — D. Lutz, Bischoff & Mayer, 1986; Australolacerta jayakari — Arnold, 1989; Omanosaura jayakari — Mayer & Bischoff, 1996

= Omanosaura jayakari =

Species of lizard

Omanosaura jayakari, also known commonly as the Jayakar lizard, Jayakar's lizard, and Jayakar's Oman lizard, is a species of lizard in the family Lacertidae. The species is native to Oman and the United Arab Emirates.

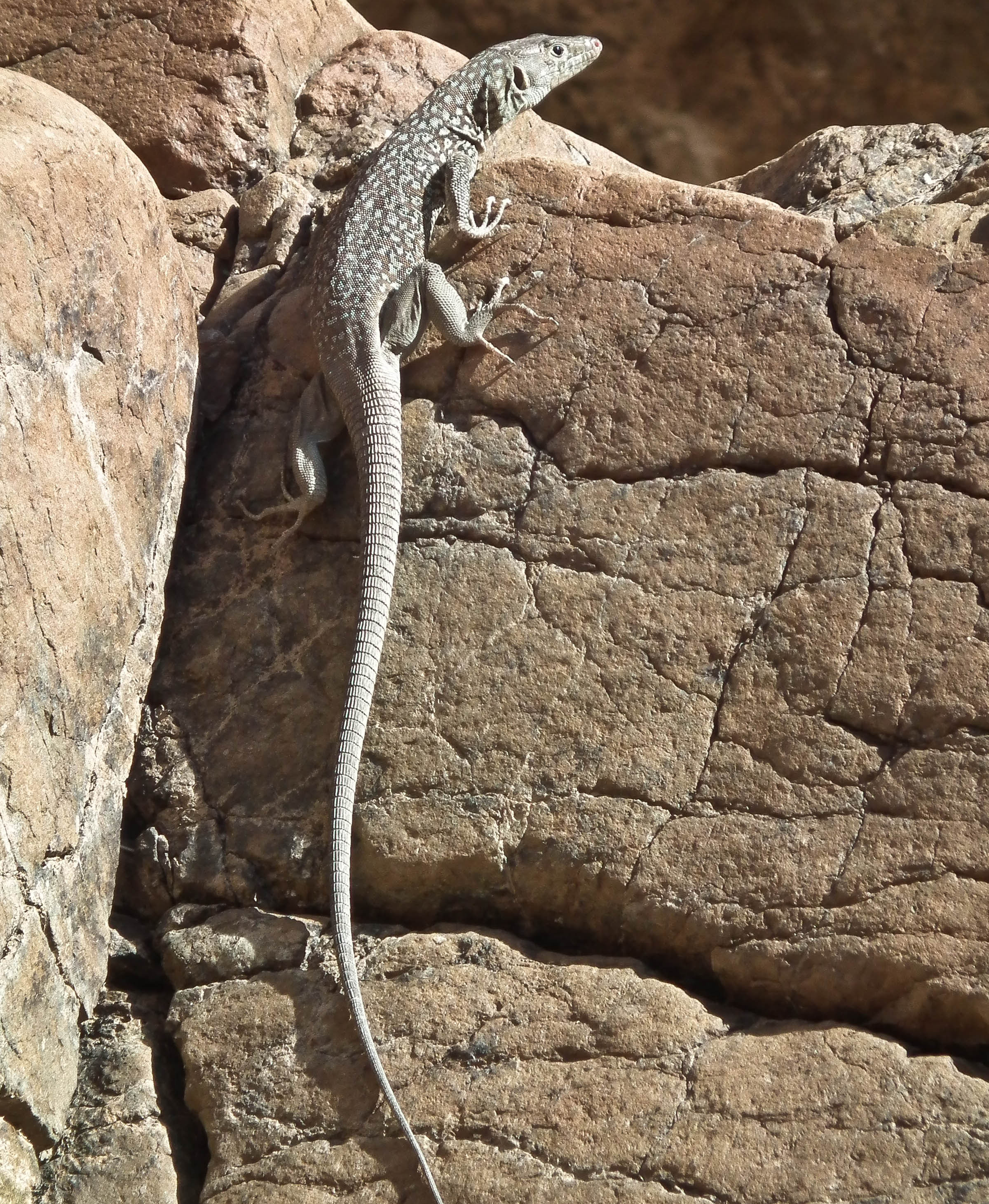
Jayakar's Oman lizard from Hatta, United Arab Emirates

== Etymology ==
The specific name, jayakari, is in honor of Indian surgeon Atmaram S. G. Jayakar, who collected the holotype.

== Habitat ==
The preferred natural habitat of O, jayakari is rocky areas near water, at altitudes from sea level to 1,676 m (5,499 ft).

== Behavior ==
O. jayakari is terrestrial.

== Diet ==
O. jayakari is omnivorous, preying upon insects, amphibians, and reptiles, and also eating plants.

== Reproduction ==
O. jayakari is oviparous.

== Taxonomy ==
Omanosaura jayakari is the type species of the genus Omanosaura.

== Gallery ==
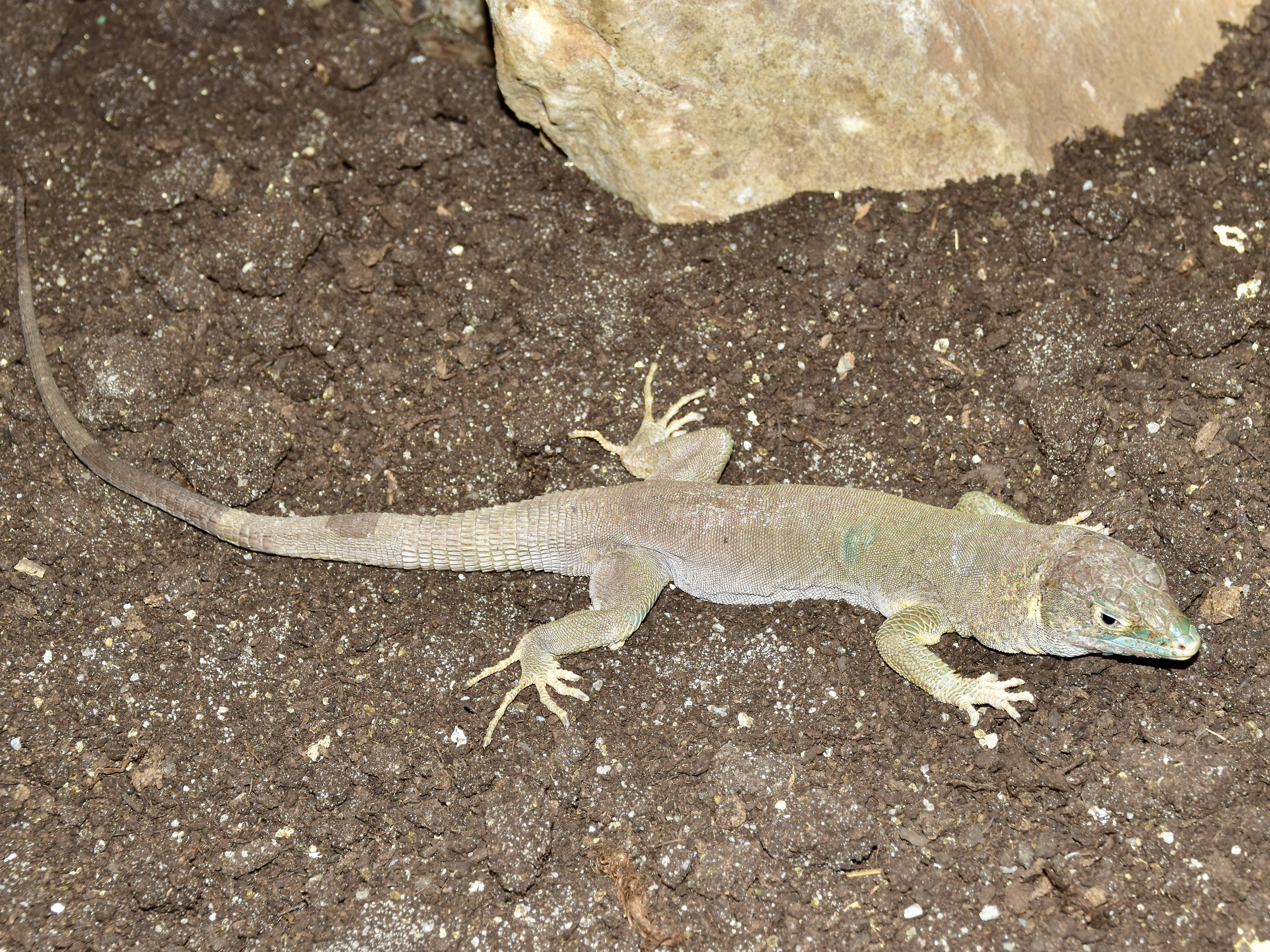
Omanosaura jayakari, Erlebnis-Zoo Hannover

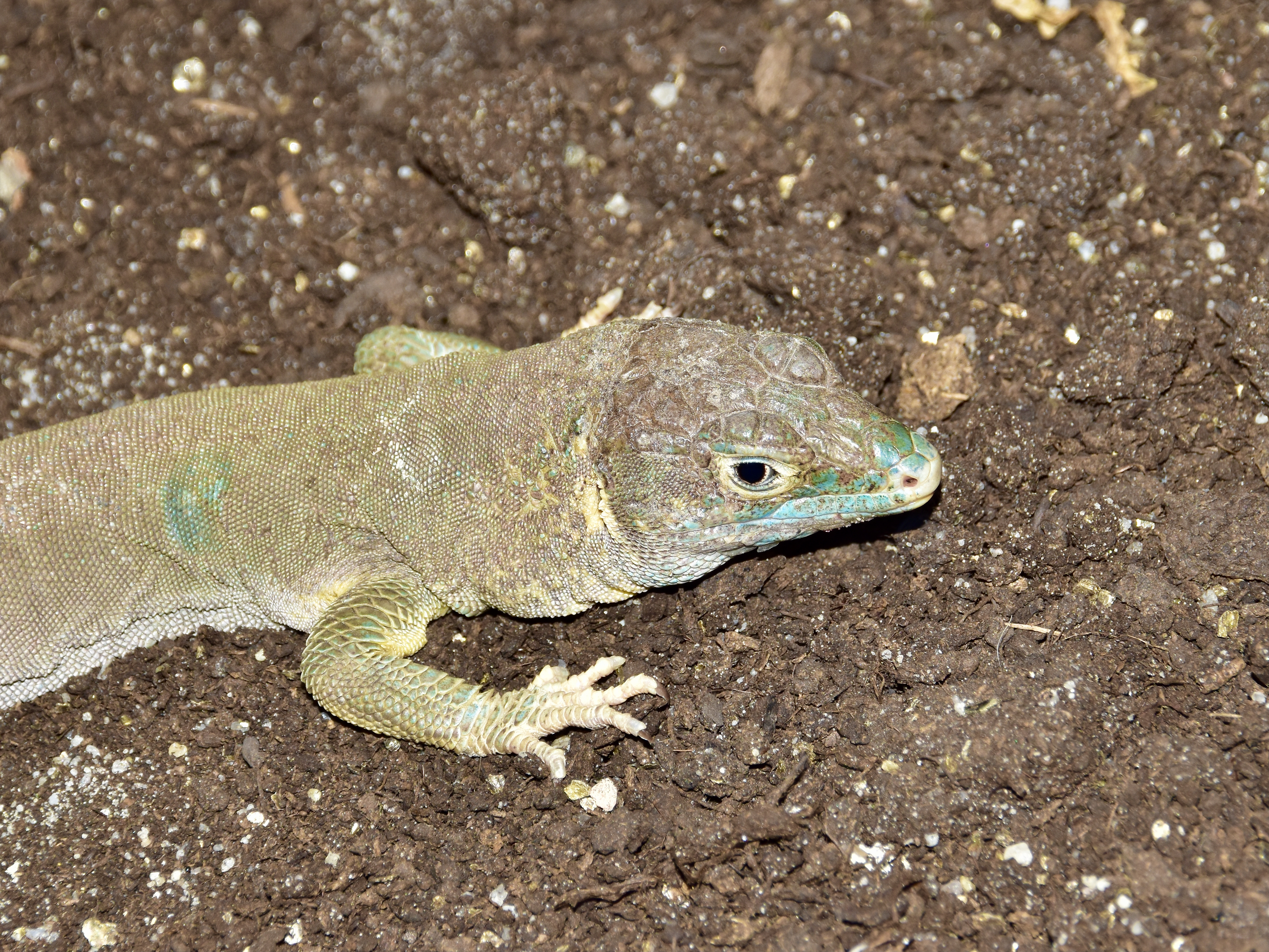
Close up photo, Erlebnis-Zoo Hannover
