= List of Saraswat Brahmins =

List of noteworthy people from Saraswat Brahmin community of India

This list comprises notable Saraswat Brahmins, by profession.

== Politics ==
- Motilal Nehru, lawyer
- Jawaharlal Nehru, former Prime Minister
- Indira Gandhi, former Prime Minister
- Beena Kak, Minister, Rajasthan
- Manohar Parrikar, former Chief Minister of Goa
- P. N. Haksar, bureaucrat and diplomat
- Tej Bahadur Sapru, lawyer
- B.N. Rau, Indian civil servant, jurist, diplomat and statesman
- N. G. Chandavarkar, former President Indian National Congress.
- Anil Desai, MP LokSabha from Mumbai South Central Lok Sabha constituency, Shiv Sena (UBT).

== Military ==
- Tapishwar Narain Raina, 9th Chief of the Army Staff of Indian Army

== Police force ==
- Sanjiv Bhatt, Indian Police Service officer of the Gujarat-cadre
- Daya Nayak, police officer

== Cinema ==
- Aditya Dhar, film director, screenwriter and lyricist
- Guru Dutt, film director
- Manav Kaul, actor
- Mani Kaul, film director
- Anupam Kher, actor
- Kunal Khemu, actor
- Raaj Kumar, actor
- Deepika Padukone, Indian actress
- M. K. Raina, actor
- Mohit Raina, actor
- Pallavi Sharda, actress
- Amrita Rao, actress
- Girish Karnad, actor, writer, theatre personality.

== Sports ==
- Prakash Padukone, badminton player.
- Suresh Raina, cricketer.

== Entertainment and music ==
- Samay Raina, stand-up comedian and YouTuber
- Sunil Dutt, actor and politician
- Sanjay Dutt, actor
