= Rajapur Saraswat =

Hindu community in Maharashtra, Kerala and Karnataka

The Rajapur Saraswat Brahmin is a Hindu Brahmin community in Maharashtra, Kerala and Karnataka. They are also known as RSB, Rajpuri or Rajapur. They come under the Other Backward Class (OBC) category in Kerala and Karnataka.

== History ==
The Rajapura Saraswat claim to have migrated to Kerala from Ratnagiri, Maharashtra after being subjected to atrocities under Portuguese rule. Their typical last name is Nayak.

== Culture ==
They are mostly vegetarian and mainly eat rice.They worship their ancestors and do not consume non-vegetarian food on the day of worship.
