= Cornelius James Pelly =

Irish-born colonial official and diplomat

Cornelius James Pelly, CMG, OBE (8 April 1908 – 1985), was an Irish-born colonial official and diplomat.

Pelly was the eldest son of Hyacinth Rutheford Pelly and Charity Maria Matthews of Heronsbrook, County Galway.

Pelly was educated at Clongowes Wood College and Trinity College Dublin, from which he received a B.A. in 1928.

He joined Indian Civil Service in 1931, becoming a member of the Indian Political Service in 1927 and a member of Her Majesty's Diplomatic Service from 1947 to 1955. During this time he served twice as Political Officer in Sharjah (April 1941-April 1942 and then June-July 1947) and also in Bahrain (1947–1952) and Kuwait (1952–1955). From 1955 to 1956 he was in the service of Abdullah III Al-Salim Al-Sabah.

Pelly was made a Member of the Order of the British Empire in 1944. In 1952 he became a Companion of the Order of St Michael and St George.

He married Una Patricia O'Shea of Lismore, County Waterford on 5 October 1949 they had 2 children, Laura (born 1952) and Peter (born 1957).
