= Chandraseniya Kayastha Prabhu =

Ethno-religious clan of South Asia

Chandraseniya Kayastha Prabhu (CKP)
Regions with significant populations
- Maharashtra, Gujarat, Madhya Pradesh and Goa

Languages
- Marathi, Konkani, Gujarati, Hindi

Religion
- Hinduism

Related ethnic groups
- Pathare Prabhu, Gaud Saraswat Brahmin

Chandraseniya Kayastha Prabhu (CKP) or historically and commonly known as Chandraseniya Prabhu or just Prabhu is a caste mainly found in Gujarat and Maharashtra. Historically, they made equally good warriors, statesmen as well as writers. They held the posts such as Deshpande and Gadkari according to the historian, B.R. Sunthankar, produced prominent warriors in Maharashtrian history.

Traditionally, in Maharashtra, the caste structure was headed by the Deshasthas, Chitpawans, Karhade, Saraswats and the CKPs. Other than the Brahmins, the Prabhus (CKPs and Pathare Prabhus) were the communities advanced in education.

The CKPs have the upanayana (janeu or thread ceremony) and have been granted the rights to study the Vedas and perform Vedic rituals along with the Brahmins. The CKP performed three Vedic karmas or duties which in Sanskrit are called: Adhyayan- studying of the Vedas, yajna- ritual done in front of a sacred fire, often with mantras and dāna – alms or charity. Ritually ranked high (along with the Brahmins), the caste may be considered socially proximate to the Brahmin community. They have traditionally been an elite and literate but a numerically small community. Rosenthal, while discussing the British era situation in Kolhapur says that they "claimed a status equal to Brahmans -a claim which the Brahmans always stridently rejected".

More formally, in Maharashtra, they are one of the Prabhu Communities and a sister caste of the Pathare Prabhu. The CKP traditionally follow the Advaita Vedanta, as propounded by Adi Shankara.

== Etymology ==
The name Chandraseniya may be a corruption of the word Chandrashreniya, which means from the valley of the Chenab River in Kashmir. This theory states that the word Kayastha originates from the term Kaya Desha, an ancient name for the region around Ayodhya. The word Prabhu means Lord or a Chief in Sanskrit language.

== History ==
=== Origin ===
The CKP claim descent from Chandrasen, an ancient Kshatriya king of Ujjain and Ayodhya and of the Haihaya family of the lunar Kshatriya Dynasty.

=== High medieval period ===
Epigraphical evidences i.e. engravings from the Shilahara times have been found in Deccan to prove that many CKPs held high posts and controlled the civilian and military administration. For example, a Shilahara inscription around A.D. 1088 mentions the names of a certain Velgi Prabhu. Lakshmana Prabhu is mentioned as a MahaDandanayaka (head of military) and MahaPradhana (prime minister); Ananta-Prabhu is mentioned as a MahaPradhana (prime minister), Kosadhikari (Head of treasury) and Mahasandhivigrahika (charge of foreign department). According to Historian and researcher S. Muley, these epigraphs might be the first available evidences of the existence of the CKP in Maharashtra.

According to the American Indologist and scholar of Religious Studies and South Asian Studies who is the Professor of International Studies and Comparative Religion at the University of Washington, Christian Lee Novetzke

In the thirteenth century they might have been considered as equal to brahmin or simply within the Brahminic ecumene, this despite the fact that modern day CKPs of Maharashtra understand themselves to have arisen from the Kshatriya varna. Thus they are an intermediate caste between brahmins and Kshatriyas.

=== Deccan sultanate and Maratha Era ===
The CKP community became more prominent during the Deccan sultanates and Maratha rule era. During Adilshahi and Nizamshahi, CKP, the Brahmins and high status Maratha were part of the elites. Given their training CKP served both as civilian and military officers. Several of the Maratha Chhatrapati Shivaji's generals and ministers, such as Murarbaji Deshpande and Baji Prabhu Deshpande, and Khando Ballal Chitnis were CKPs.

In 17th-century Maharashtra, during Shivaji's time, the so-called higher classes i.e. the Marathi Brahmins, CKPs and Saraswat Brahmins, due to social and religious restrictions were the only communities that had a system of education for males. Except these three castes, education for all other castes and communities was very limited and consisted of listening to stories from religious texts like the Puranas or to Kirtans and thus the common masses remained illiterate and backward. Hence Shivaji was compelled to use people from these three educated communities – Marathi Brahmins, CKPs and Saraswat Brahmins – for civilian posts as they required education and intellectual maturity. However, in this time period, these three as well as other communities, depending on caste, also contributed their share to Shivaji's "Swaraj"(self-rule) by being cavalry soldiers, commanders, mountaineers, seafarers etc. During the Peshwa era, the CKP's main preceptor or Vedic Guru was a Brahmin by the name of Abashastri Takle, who was referred to by the CKP community as "Gurubaba". Sale of liquor was banned by the Brahmin administrators to the Brahmins, CKPs, Pathare Prabhus and Saraswat Brahmins but there was no objection to other castes drinking it or even to the castes such as Bhandaris from manufacturing it. As the Maratha empire/confederacy expanded in the 18th century, and given the nepotism of the Peshwa of Pune towards their own Chitpavan Brahmin caste, CKP and other literal castes migrated for administration jobs to the new Maratha ruling states such as the Bhosale of Nagpur, the Gaekwads, the Scindia, the Holkars etc., The Gaekwads of Baroda and the Bhosale of Nagpur gave preference to CKPs in their administration.

==== Varna dispute and Gramanya ====
The CKPs, described as a traditionally well-educated and intellectual group claimed themselves as Kshatriyas, while the predominant regional Brahmin belief was that they were Shudras (considering that there are no true Kshatriyas in the Kali Yuga). The dispute first broke out few years before the coronation of Shivaji, and was related to the Upanayana rights of the CKP community. CKPs even demanded privileges of the Brahmin order – the rights to conduct the Vedic rituals (all by themselves) and satkarma (all six karmas of the Brahmin order) for which they were opposed especially by the Chitpawans. At times, there were Gramanyas, i.e. "dispute involving the supposed violation of the Brahmanical ritual code of behavior" also known as "Vedokta disputes", initiated by certain individuals who tried to stop CKP rights to Upanayana. These individuals based their opinion on the belief that no true Kshatriyas existed in the Kali Yuga; however the upanayana for CKPs were supported by prominent Brahmin arbitrators like Gaga Bhatt and Ramshastri Prabhune who gave decisions in the favor of the community. Just after the death of Shivaji this dispute raised again but this time the opinion shifted against the views of Gangabhatta. During the Peshwa era Gramanyas were very common and some Chitpawans, at times, initiated Gramanya against other communities – Prabhu communities (CKP, Pathare Prabhu), Saraswats and Shukla Yajurvedis. however they did not come to fruition . The Gramanya during the Peshwa eras finally culminated in the favor of the CKPs as the Vedokta had support from the Shastras and this was affirmed by two letters from Brahmins from Varanasi as well as one from Pune Brahmins ratified by Bajirao II himself. In the final Gramanya, started by Neelkanthashastri and his relative Balaji Pant Natu, a rival of the CKP Vedic scholar V.S.Parasnis at the court of Satara, the Shankaracharya himself intervened as arbiter and he gave his verdict by fully endorsing the rights over Vedas for the CKP. The Shankaracharya's letter is addressed to all Brahmins and he refers to various Shastras, earlier verdicts in the favour of the CKPS as well as letters about the lineage of the CKP to make his decision and void the dispute started by Natu.

===== Scholarly interpretation =====
Modern scholars quote statements that show that they were due to political malice – especially given that the Gramanya was started by a certain Yamaji Pant who had sent an assassin to murder a rival CKP. This was noted by Gangadharshastri Dikshit who gave his verdict in favor of the CKPs. Abashastri Takle had used the scriptures to establish their "Vedokta". Similarly, the famous jurist Ramshastri Prabhune also supported the CKPs Vedokta.

The analysis of gramanyas against the CKP was done in depth by historians from the University of Toronto. Modern scholars conclude that the fact that the CKPs held high ranking positions in administration and the military and as statesmen was a "double edged sword". Historians, while analyzing the gramanyas state "As statesmen, they were engulfed in the court intrigues and factions, and, as a result, were prone to persecution by opposing factions. On the other hand, their influence in the court meant that they could wield enough political clout to effect settlements in favor of their caste.". The late Indian professor of sociology, Govind Sadashiv Ghurye commented on the strictness of the caste system during the Peshwa rule in Maharashtra by noting that even advanced caste such as the Prabhus had to establish rights to carry on with the vedic rituals.

University of Toronto historians and Professors Emeriti, Milton Israel and N.K Wagle opine about this as follows in their analysis:

The CKP could undertake the six functions (satkarma) because they had the expertise to do so. Aba Parasnis the CKP[in the early 1800s] could easily hold his own and argue intricate points from the vedas, puranas and the dharmasastras in a debate which resulted in his composition of the siddhantavijaya in sanskrit.He prepared the sanskara manual(karmakalpadruma), which was published by Pratapsimha. The CKP as an educated elite therefore, were a serious challenge to the Brahman monopoly of Vedokta. (Note: quote on page 168:The CKP could undertake the six functions (satkarma) because they had the expertise to do so. Aba Parasnis the CKP[ in the early 1800s] could easily hold his own and argue intricate points from the vedas, puranas and the dharmasastras in a debate which resulted in his composition of the siddhantavijaya in sanskrit.He prepared the samskara manual(karmakalpadruma), which was published by Pratapsimha. The CKP as an educated elite therefore, were a serious challenge to the Brahman monopoly of Vedokta.)

=== British era and later ===
During the British colonial era, the two literate communities of Maharashtra, namely the Brahmins and the CKP were the first to adopt western education with enthusiasm and prospered with opportunities in the colonial administration. A number of CKP families also served the semi-independent princely states in Maharashtra and other regions of India, such as Baroda.

The British era of the 1800s and 1900s saw the publications dedicated to finding sources of CKP history The book Prabhu Kul Deepika gives the gotras (rishi name) and pravaras etc. of the CKP caste. Another publication, Kayastha-mitra (Volume 1, No.9. Dec 1930) gives a list of north Indian princely families that belonged to the CKP caste.

Rango Bapuji Gupte, the CKP representative of the deposed Raja Pratapsinh Bhosale of Satara spent 13 years in London in the 1840s and 50s to plead for restoration of the ruler without success. At the time of the Indian rebellion of 1857, Rango tried to raise a rebel force to fight the British but the plan was thwarted and most of the conspirators were executed. However, Rango Bapuji escaped from his captivity and was never found.

When the prominent Marathi historian Vishwanath Kashinath Rajwade contested their claimed Kshatriya status in a 1916 essay, Prabodhankar Thackeray objected to Rajwade's assumptions and wrote a text outlining the identity of the caste, and its contributions to the Maratha empire. In this text, Gramanyachya Sadhyant Itihas, he wrote that the CKPs "provided the cement" for Shivaji's swaraj (self-rule) "with their blood".

Gail Omvedt concludes that during the British era, the overall literacy of Brahmins and CKP was overwhelmingly high as opposed to the literacy of others such as the Kunbis and Marathas for whom it was strikingly low. (Note: Omvedt does add a proviso saying that :There is difficulty in using such Census data, particularly because the various categories tended to be defined in different ways in different years, and different criteria were used in different provinces for classifying the population. Nonetheless, the overall trend is clear)

In 1902, all communities other than Marathi Brahmins, Saraswat Brahmins, Prabhus (Chandraseniya Kayastha Prabhus, Pathare Prabhus) and Parsi were considered backward and 50% reservation was provided for them in by the princely state of Kolhapur. In 1925, the only communities that were not considered backward by the British Government in the Bombay Presidency were Brahmins, CKP, Pathare Prabhus, Marwaris, Parsis, Banias and Christians.

In Pune, the descendents of Sakharam Hari Gupte donated premises for conducting thread ceremonies and marriages for the members of the CKP community and the facilities were available to other communities as well.

According to the studies by D.L.Sheth, the former director of the Center for the Study of Developing Societies in India (CSDS), educated upper castes and communities – Punjabi Khatris, Kashmiri Pandits, CKPs, the Chitpawans, Nagar Brahmins, South Indian Brahmins, Bhadralok Bengalis, etc., along with the Parsis and upper crusts of the Muslim and Christian society were among the Indian communities in 1947, at the time of Indian independence, that constituted the middle class and were traditionally "urban and professional" (following professions like doctors, lawyers, teachers, engineers, etc.). According to P. K. Varma, "education was a common thread that bound together this pan Indian elite" and almost all the members of these communities could read and write English and were educated "beyond school"

== Culture ==
The mother tongue of most of the community is now Marathi, though in Gujarat they also communicate with their neighbours in Gujarati, and use the Gujarati script, while those in Maharashtra speak English and Hindi with outsiders, and use the Devanagari script.

According to anthropologist Iravati Karve, their "ways of living, dress, worship, cremation" are exactly like those of the Brahmins except that they are not necessarily vegetarian.

The CKPs holds the varna rank of Kshatriya. They performed three "vedic karmas"(studying vedas, fire sacrifice, giving alms) as opposed to full("Shatkarmi") Brahmins who performed six vedic duties which also include accepting gifts, teaching Vedas to other and performing vedic rites for others. They also followed rituals, like the sacred thread (Janeu) ceremony, the observation of the period of mourning and seclusion by person of a deceased's lineage by the CKPs has traditionally been for 10 days although Kshatriyas generally observe it for 12 days. Educationally and professionally, 20th century research showed that the Saraswat, CKP, Deshastha and Chitpawan were quite similar. Researcher and professor Dr.Neela Dabir sums it up as follows "In Maharashtra for instance, the family norms among the Saraswat Brahmins and CKPs were similar to those of the Marathi Brahmins". However, she also criticizes these communities by concluding that until the 20th century, the Marathi Brahmin, CKP and Saraswat Brahmin communities, due to their upper-caste ritualistic norms, traditionally discouraged widow remarriage. This resulted in distress in the lives of widows from these castes as opposed to widows from other Marathi Hindu castes.

They worship Ganesh, Vishnu and other Hindu gods. Some CKPs may also be devotees of the religious swamis from their own caste – Ram Maruti Maharaj(Deshpande) and "Gajanan Maharaj (Gupte)", who took samadhis at Kalyan (in 1919) and Nasik (in 1946) respectively. (Note: quote from page 14: Rubbing shoulders with the portraits of the Gods and Goddesses would be pictures of Ram Maruti Maharaj or Gajanan Maharaj(both CKP Swamis, whose samadhis are at Kalyan and Nasik respectively)....Almost every C K.P home will have either a coloured or a black-and-white portrait of Sai Baba of Shirdi...) Many CKP clans have Ekvira temple at Karle as their family deity whereas others worship Vinzai, Kadapkarin, Janani as their family deity.

CKPs have had a progressive attitude regarding female education compared to other communities. For example, Dr. Christine Dobbin's research concludes that the educationally advanced communities in the 1850s – the CKPS, Pathare Prabhus, Saraswats, Daivadnya and the Parsis were the first communities in the Bombay Presidency that allowed female education.
