= Christian Lee Novetzke =

Christian Lee Novetzke (born 24 December 1969) is an American Indologist and scholar of Religious Studies and South Asian Studies. He is Professor of International Studies and Comparative Religion at the University of Washington, where he holds an endowed professorship from the College of Arts and Sciences. His areas of interest include Indian cultural history and the theorization of religion. As an author, he has also been largely collected by libraries.

At the University of Washington, Novetzke serves as Director of the Center for Global Studies, as well as associate director of the Henry M. Jackson School of International Studies.

== Education and career ==
Novetzke received a B.A. from Macalester College in 1993 and an M.T.S. in Religious Studies from Harvard University in 1996. In 2003, he was awarded a Ph.D. in Religious Studies from Columbia University.

After teaching in the departments of South Asian Studies and Religious Studies at the University of Pennsylvania from 2003 to 2007, Novetzke joined the University of Washington in 2007. He has developed and taught courses on Hinduism (particularly the Bhakti traditions); theories of religion; Indian culture; and the history and politics of yoga.

== Honors and recognition ==
Novetzke's first book, Religion and Public Memory: A Cultural History of Saint Namdev in India, was awarded Best First Book in the History of Religions by the American Academy of Religion.

Throughout his career, he has been awarded fellowships and grants by institutions such as Fulbright, the American Council of Learned Societies, the American Institute of Indian Studies, and the National Endowment for the Humanities.

== Reception for Amar Akbar Anthony: Bollywood, Brotherhood, and the Nation ==
In 2016, Novetzke, along with co-authors William Elison and Andy Rotman, published a book on the 1977 Bollywood film Amar Akbar Anthony. Though published by the scholarly Harvard University Press, the book, entitled Amar Akbar Anthony: Bollywood, Brotherhood, and the Nation, attracted the attention of the mainstream Indian press, with the authors giving interviews about the book for the Hindu, Mid-Day, and Daily News and Analysis.

In his review of the book in the Hindu, Jai Arjun Singh notes, "Here's a scholarly work about a popular film that also tries to mimic something of the film's controlled lunacy, winking at itself every now and again."

Frontline's C.S. Venkiteswaran calls the work "an eminently readable book that will delight any cineaste for its sheer passion for cinema and for the delightful theoretical dexterity with which it weaves a complex and rich web of information and analysis."

== Selected bibliography ==
=== Books ===
- Religion and Public Memory: A Cultural History of Saint Namdev in India. New York: Columbia University Press, 2008. ISBN 9780231141857.
- Amar Akbar Anthony: Bollywood, Brotherhood, and the Nation (with William Elison and Andy Rotman). Cambridge, MA: Harvard University Press, 2016. ISBN 9780674504486.
- The Quotidian Revolution: Vernacularization, Religion, and the Premodern Public Sphere in India. New York: Columbia University Press, 2016. ISBN 9780231175807.
- Bhakti & Power - Debating India's Religion of the Heart. Seattle: University of Washington Press, 2019. ISBN 9780295745503.
- The Yoga of Power. Seattle: University of Washington Press, 2024. ISBN 9780231220019.

=== Selected articles ===
- "Twice Dalit: The Poetry of Hira Bansode in Translation," Journal of South Asian Literature. Vol. 28, Nos. 1 and 2 (Spring 1995): 279–96.
- "Divining an Author: The Idea of Authorship in an Indian Religious Tradition," History of Religions, Vol. 42, No.3 (February 2003): 213–242.
- "The Laine Controversy and the Study of Hinduism," International Journal of Hindu Studies. Vol. 8, Issues 1-3 (2004): 183–201.
- "The Study of Indian Religions in the US Academy," India Review, Vol. 5, No. 1 (January 2006): 91–121.
- "The Subaltern Numen: Making History in the Name of God." History of Religions, Vol. 46, No. 2 (November 2006): 99–126.
- "Bhakti and Its Public," International Journal of Hindu Studies, Vol. 11, No. 3 (December 2007): 255–272.
- "The Theographic and the Historiographic in an Indian Sacred Life Story," Sikh Formations, Vol. 3, No. 2 (December 2007): 169–184.
- "The Brahman Double: The Brahminical Construction of Anti-Brahminism and Anti-Caste Sentiment in the Religious Culture of Pre-Colonial Maharashtra," South Asia History and Cul1ture, Vol. 2, No. 2 (April 2012): 232–252.
