= Pathare Prabhu =

Hindu community in Maharashtra, India

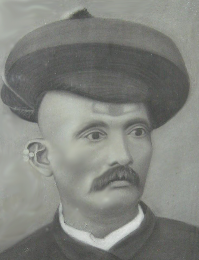
Pathare Prabhu middle-class man of nineteenth century.

Pathare Prabhu is one of the Hindu communities found mainly in the Indian state of Maharashtra.

== Introduction ==
The Pathare Prabhus and the Chandraseniya Kayastha Prabhus (CKP) are considered sister communities, both being part of the 'Prabhu caste'. Both Pathare Prabhu and CKP follow the Advaita Vedanta Smarta tradition of Hinduism propounded by Adi Shankara.

Along with all the Maharashtrian Brahmin castes and the CKP, they are considered one of the 'high' or 'elite' castes of Maharashtra.

The Pathare Prabhu, in the 19th century would refer to Mumbai (then known as Bombay) as 'Desh' (country). They formed the "Union Club" under which were the five primary collectives of Girgaon, Mazagaon, Parel, Mahim and Worli. In 1887, they held a meeting at the "Desh" level in which it was decided to stop inviting "naikins" (dancers) to sing at the Upanayana (thread ceremonies or "munja") and marriage celebrations. Historians cite an incident where a Pathare Prabhu member who broke this rule two years later was socially outcast by the community. He sued for defamation but the British Court ruled against him.

== Notable people ==
- Moroba Kanhoba – 19th century writer and social reformer (women's rights advocate), author of the famous Marathi novel "Ghashiram Kotwal". His highly publicized marriage to a widow ended in a tragedy after the couple was found dead within a year of the marriage.
- Shivkar Bapuji Talpade – allegedly flew an unmanned heavier-than-air aircraft in 1895, this pseudohistorical claim was made by Hindu nationalists.
- Atmaram Sadashiv Jayakar – Notable zoologist, physician, naturalist and explorer. Best known for his scientific study on animals and medical surveys of Oman. He described some unknown species like Arabitragus jayakari, Hippocampus jayakari and Omanosaura jayakari, all named after him. He also studied the Omani dialect of Arabic.
- Mahadev Vishwanath Dhurandhar – Well known Indian painter and artist.
- Kanhoba Ranchoddas Kirtikar – Notable botanist, surgeon and Marathi poet.
- Mukund Ramarao Jayakar – First vice chancellor of the University of Pune.
- Raobahadur Narayan Dinanath Velkar (1798–1870) – 19th century social reformer, and first Native Municipal Commissioner of Bombay city and one of the founders of The Times of India.

== See also ==
- Pathare Prabhu (Kanchole)
