= Christianity in Maharashtra =

Christianity in Indian state

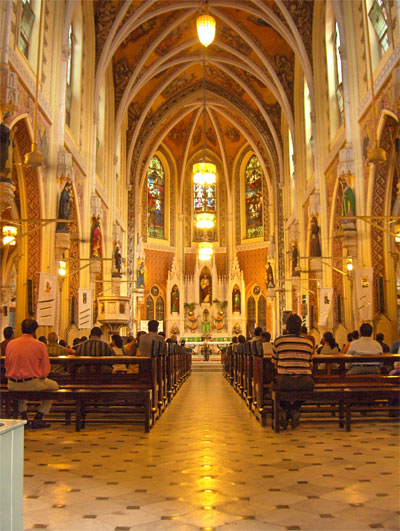
Interior of the Cathedral of the Holy Name, Colaba, Mumbai

Christianity is a minority religion in Maharashtra, a state of India. Approximately 79.8% of the population of Maharashtra are Hindus, with Christian adherents being 1.0% of the population. The Roman Catholic archdiocese whose seat is in Maharashtra is the Roman Catholic Archdiocese of Bombay. There are two different Christian ethnic communities in Maharashtra: the Bombay East Indians, who are predominantly Roman Catholic, and the Marathi Christians, who are predominantly Protestant with a small Roman Catholic population.

Catholic Christians in Maharashtra are mainly concentrated in the Konkan division, especially Vasai (Bassein), Mumbai (Bombay) & Raigad (Colaba) districts; they are known as Bombay East Indians; they were evangelised by Portuguese missionaries during the 15th–16th centuries. Protestants who reside throughout the Maharashtra, being significant in Ahmednagar, Solapur, Pune, Aurangabad, and Jalna, are called Marathi Christians; they were evangelized by British and American missionaries during British rule in the Bombay Presidency.

The Church of North India has dioceses in the state and is a large Protestant church with full communion with the Anglican Church. There are also some members of the Christian Revival Church in Maharashtra, who live mostly in the western coastal regions of the state.

Christians in Maharashtra
Year	Number	Percentage
2001	1,058,313	1.09
2011	1,080,073	0.96

== History ==
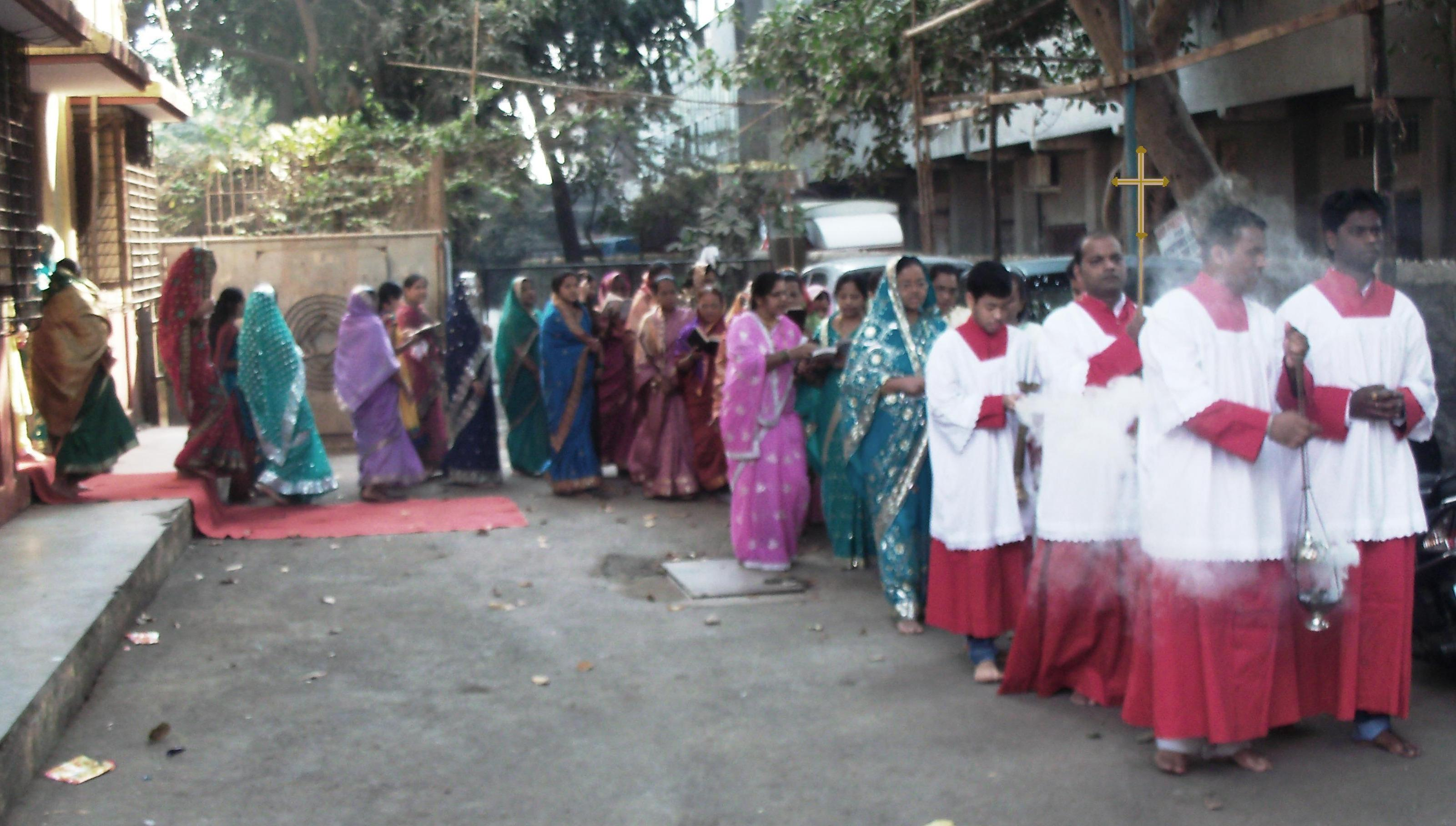
Crucession by Marathi Christians in Mumbai

Christianity was brought to the North Konkan region of Maharashtra by Bartholomew, one of the twelve apostles of Christ. Pantaenus visited India in about AD 180, and there he found a Gospel of Matthew written in the Hebrew language, left with the Christians there by Barthlomew. This is mentioned by church historian Eusebius, and by Jerome in one of his letters. A flourishing Christian community in the 6th century was mentioned by Kosmos Indicopleustes and Jordanus, who worked among the Christians in Thana and Sopara areas in the 13th century. The French Dominican friar Jordanus Catalani of Severac (in south-western France) started evangelizing activities in Thana and Sopara and was the first work of Rome in North Konkan.

Most of the history of the church in India is lost between the 9th and 14th centuries, as Persia went over to Nestorianism in 800 AD. Since the provision of church offices and all the apparatus of public worship was looked to a foreign source, the Indian Christians were reduced to "nominal" Christians when this foreign aid was withdrawn. When Dominican and Franciscan missionaries arrived in the 1300s with the intention of preaching the Gospel, they were surprised to find a small Christian community already in existence. Protestant missionaries first arrived in Maharashtra from England and the United States in 1813 after the passing of the Charter Act 1813 by the British parliament.

== East Indians (Mobaikars) ==
East Indians, also known as Mobaikars, are an ethno-religious group native to the Seven Islands of Bombay and Mumbai metropolitan area in the northern Konkan Division. Christianity was first installed by Bartholomew, one of Jesus Christ's apostles. Owing to a shortage of priests for many years, the locals were reduced to being "nominal Christians". It was because of the arrival of Portuguese and with them Jesuit missionaries who spread a new form of Christianity called Roman Catholicism in the area. The name Bombay East Indians was taken in the British India to differentiate native Christians of Greater Bombay, from those of Goa and Mangalore who came to Mumbai in search of jobs, on the occasion of golden jubilee of Queen Victoria.

They are engaged in agriculture, fishing and other occupations handed down to them by their ancestors. Bombay East Indians are generally more anglicised than other Maharashtrian Christians. The influence of the Portuguese Bombay and Bassein era can be seen in their religion and names, but their language has dominated by Marathi since the Mahratta Confederacy seized control of Konkan in 1739 AD.

== Bardeskars ==
A Konkani Christian native of Bardes, Goa - their ancestral hometown; is called Bardeskar. Bardeskars are an ethno-religious Christian community adhering to the Roman Rite from the Sindhudurg diocese (Sindhudurg and Ratnagiri districts) of the southern Konkan division of Maharashtra, India. Sporadic settlements of Ghata Voylem Kristanv (Konkani for "Christians from above the Ghats") are also found in the uplands of Kolhapur, Belgaum, North Canara & Dharwad districts. They belong to the Konkani ethnicity and Konkani is their first language. Marathi and Kannada are among the other languages spoken by them.

== Kudali Catholics ==
Catholic Christians of Kudal, Sawantwadi, and Ratnagiri speak the Kudali or Malvani dialect of Konkani.

== Marathi Christians ==
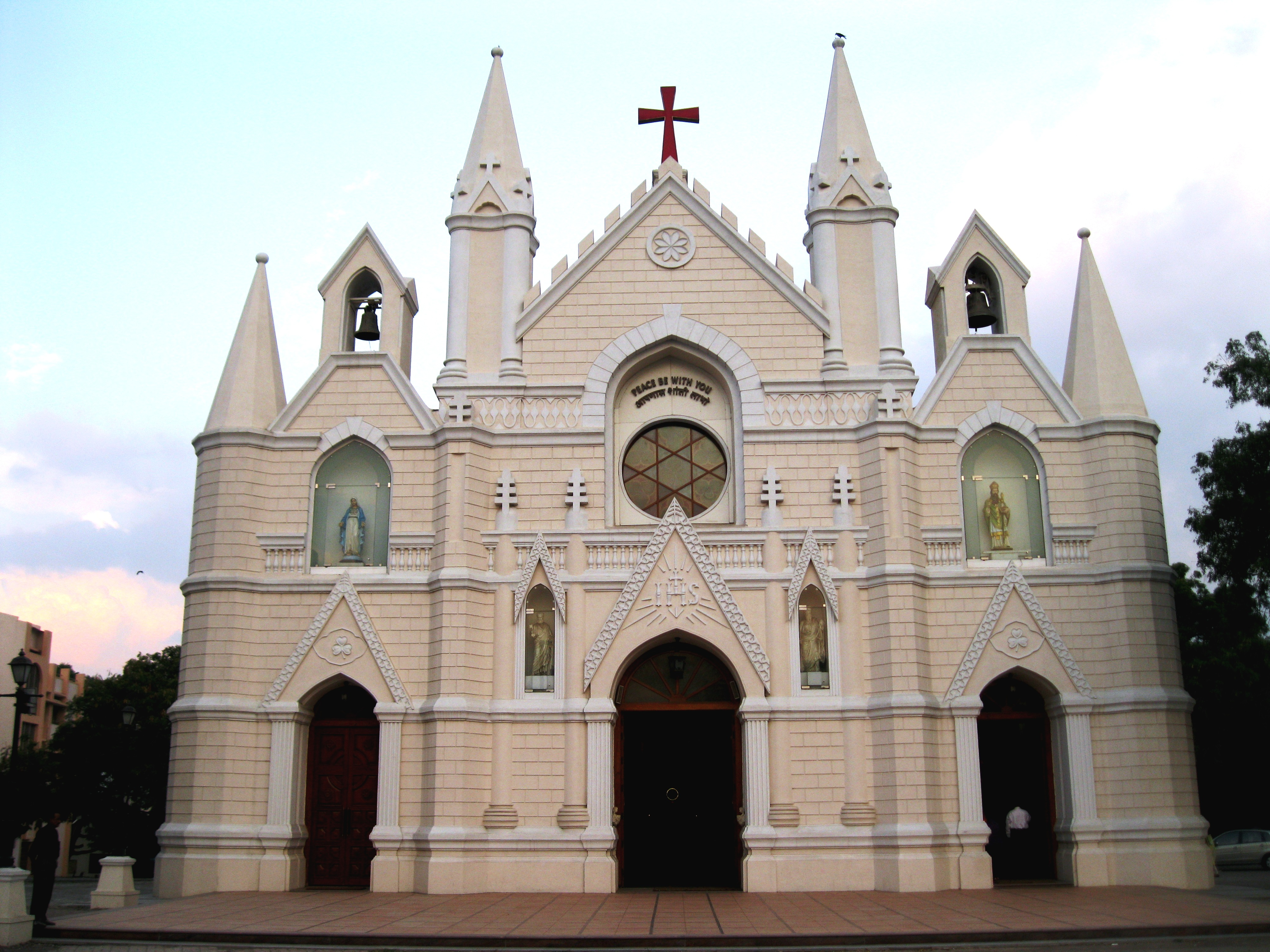
St. Patrick's Cathedral, Pune

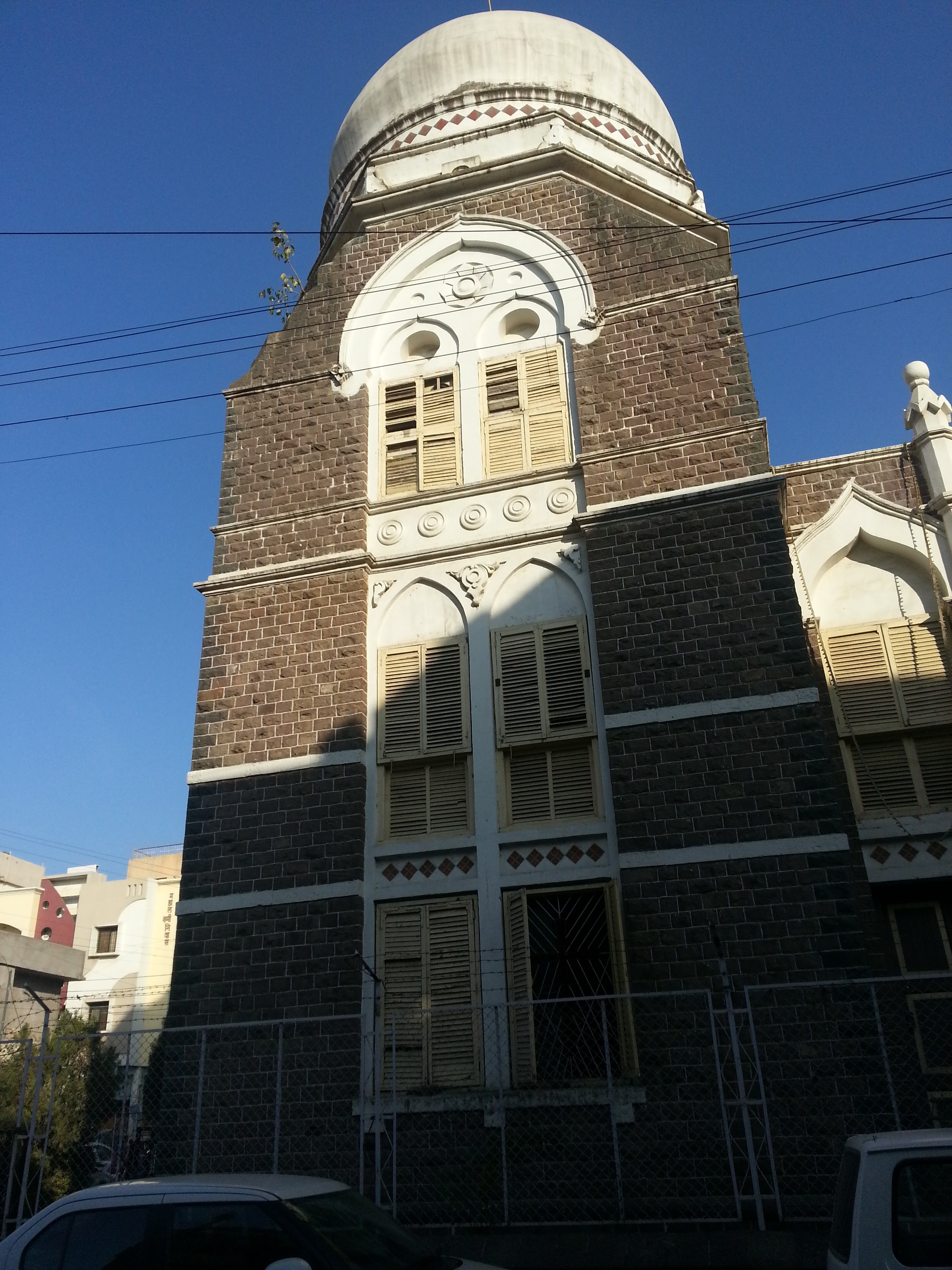
Hume Memorial Church in Ahmednagar

Marathi Christians are predominantly Protestant with small numbers of Roman Catholics. They belong to several Protestant denominations, but mainly the Church of North India. British missionary William Carey was instrumental in translating the Bible into the Marathi language.

In Maharashtra, Protestant Christians are mainly converts from Hinduism and some from Islam. The first Protestant mission to India was the American Marathi Mission. The main center of Protestant activity in the Maharashtra region during British colonial rule was in Ahmadnagar district. The first Protestant mission in the district was opened in 1831 by the American Marathi mission.

In Maharashtra, the Protestant missionaries concentrated not only on direct evangelism but also founded numerous small vernacular schools. Scottish Presbyterian Missionary John Wilson built Wilson College, Mumbai.

Church in Miri-Maka

=== Culture ===
There are similarities of customs and culture between Hindus and Marathi Christians, such as dress, food, and cuisine. The Hindu custom of wearing saree, mangalsutra, and bindis is still prominent among native Christians. Marathi Christians highly retain their Marathi culture, and they have kept their Pre-Christian surnames. In Maharashtra, the great Marathi poet Narayan Wamanrao Tilak realised that a Hindu–Christian synthesis was simply not possible, unless the Christian religion had deep roots in the Indian culture. He trained the Marathi Christians to worship and sing bhajan and kirtan. He showed Christian faith in a genuinely Indian way.

== List of denominations ==
- Assemblies of God
- Catholic Church in India
- St Thomas Christians
- Church of North India
- Christian Congregation in India
- The Pentecostal Mission
- Greater Grace World Outreach- Indian Missions
- Hindustani Covenant Church
- Methodist Church in India
- Indian Evangelical Team
- International Christian Fellowship
- Separate Baptists in Christ
- New Life Fellowship Association
- Christian Revival Church
- Free Methodist Church

== See also ==
- Marathi Christian
- Bombay East Indians
- Goans
- Konkani people
- Mangalorean Christians
- Christian Revival Church
