= Marathi Christians =

Ethnoreligious group

Marathi Christian
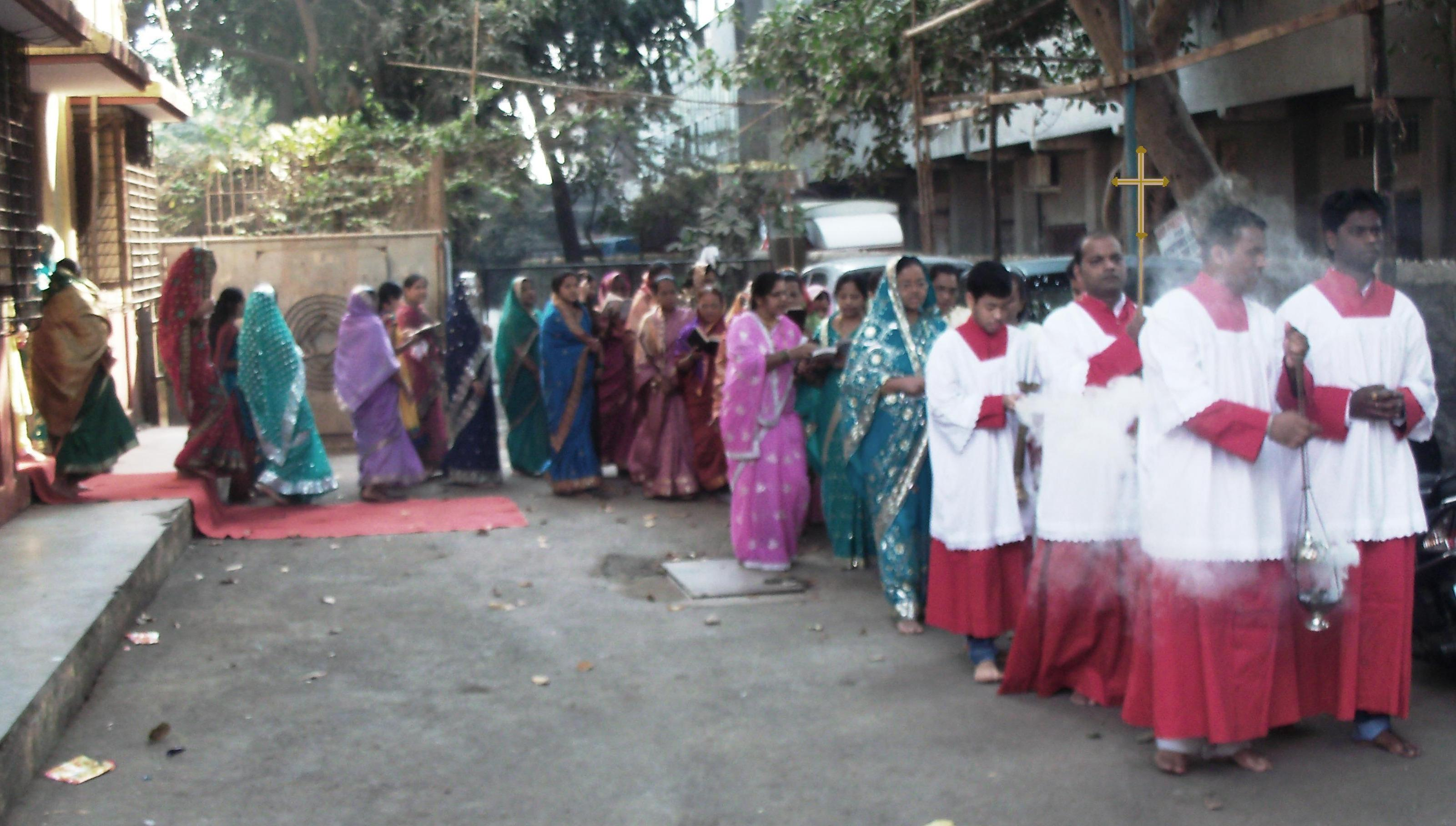
- Crucession of Marathi Christian in Mumbai

Regions with significant populations

Religions
- Predominantly Protestant (Anglican, Methodist, evangelical), Catholic (minority)

Languages
- Marathi

Marathi Christians are an ethnoreligious group of the Indian state of Maharashtra who accepted Christianity during the 18th and 19th centuries during the East India Company, and later, the British Raj. Conversions to Protestantism were a result of Christian missions such as the American Marathi Mission, Church Mission Society and the Church of England's United Society for the Propagation of the Gospel.

Church in Miri-Maka

== History ==
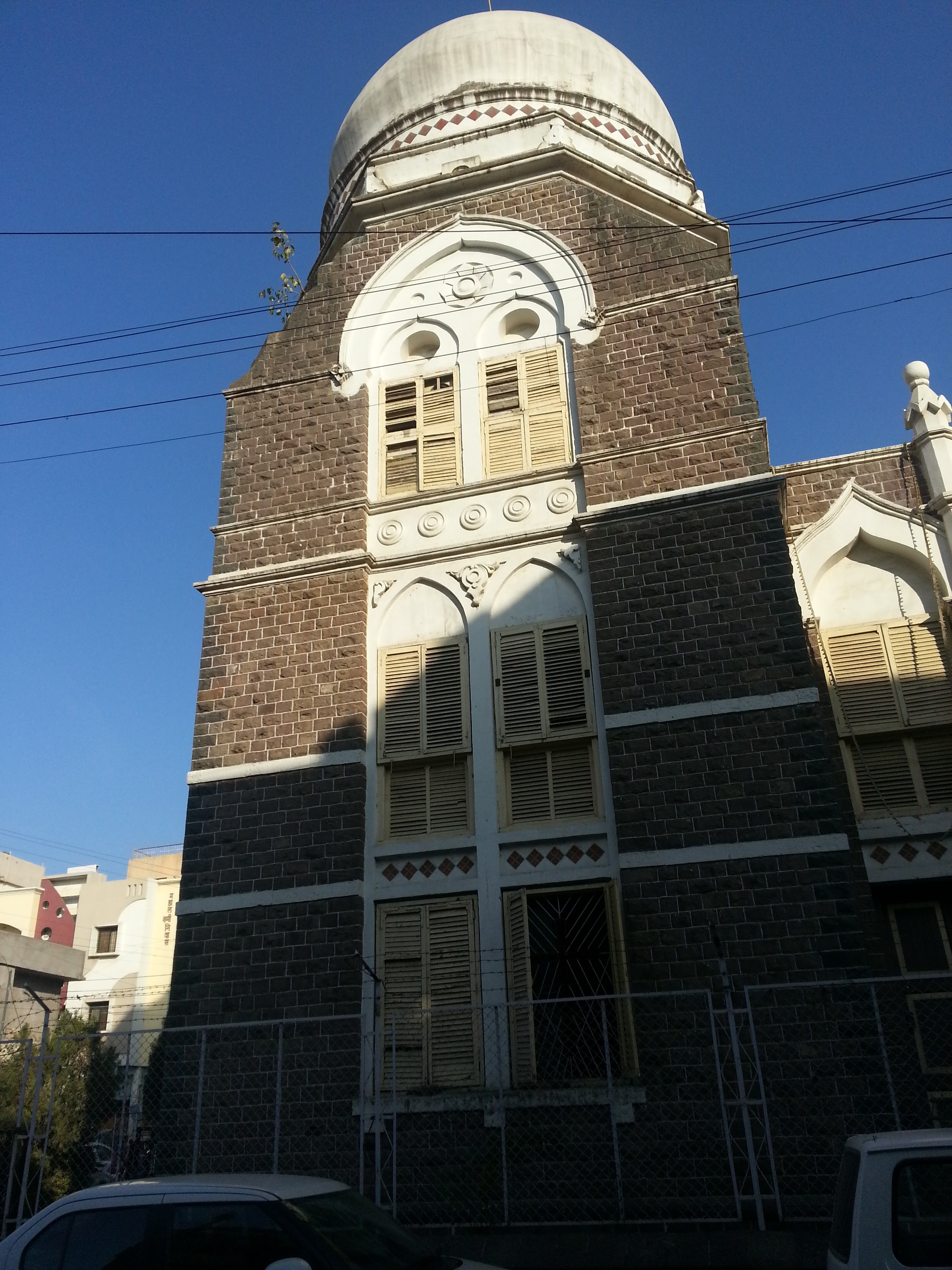
Hume Memorial church Ahmadnagar, the church built by American Marathi mission in 1902

In the 18th Century Missionaries reached to the untouchables and poor sections of society, imparting western education and raising awareness of human rights and sharing the gospel, teaching the bible inspired many. Education, healthcare, social reform, and the active efforts of missionaries have played a significant role in the spread of Christianity. Around the turn of the 18th century, British Baptist missionary William Carey was instrumental in translating the Bible into the Marathi language. Most of the converts were lower-caste Hindus with some upper-caste Hindus and Muslims.

=== Ahmednagar ===
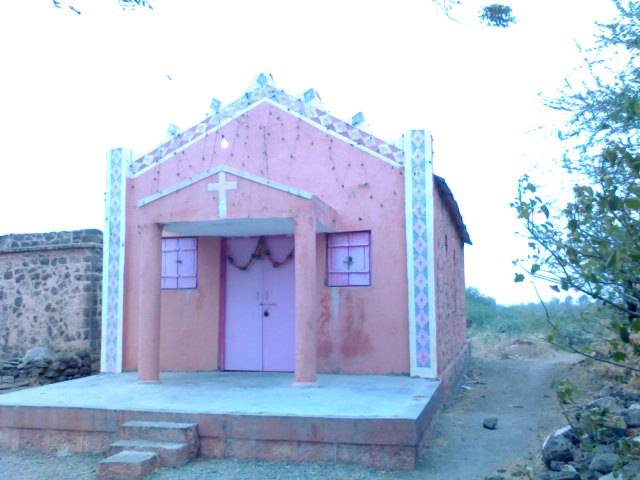
Church in Vadule village

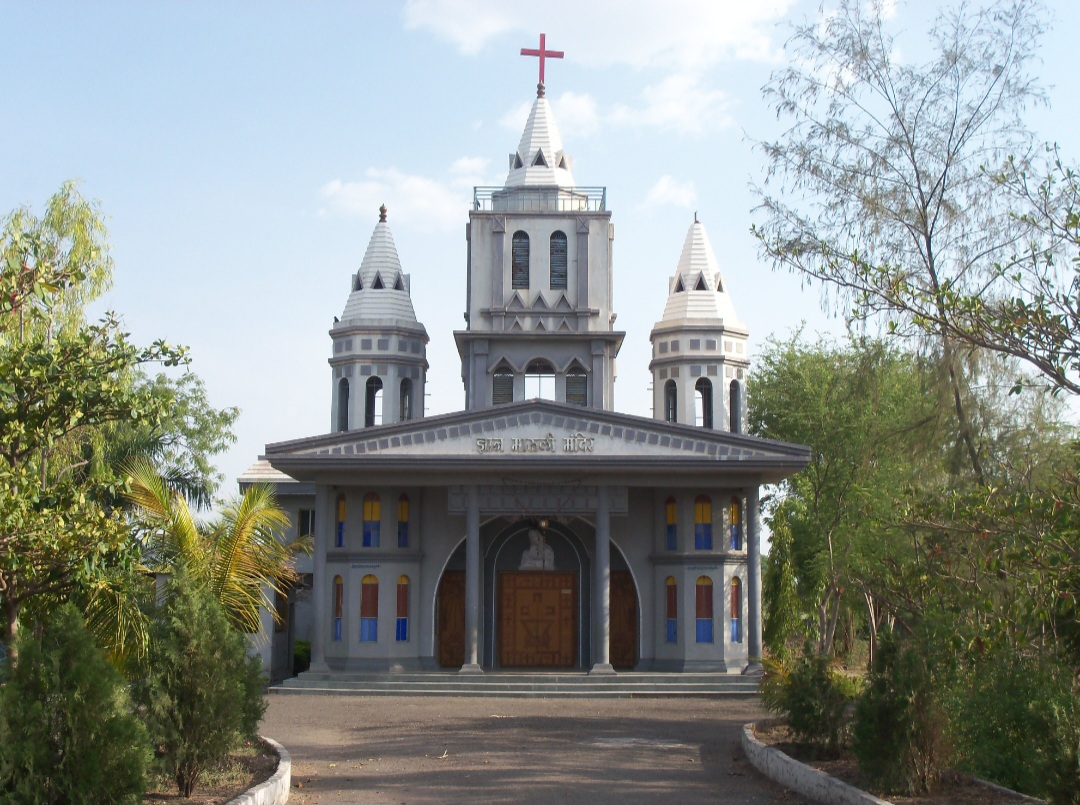
Church In Nevasa, Ahmednagar

The American Board of Commissioners for Foreign Missions established their first foreign mission with the American Marathi mission in Bombay on 21 December 1813, it was the first Protestant Mission in Western India and spread into hundreds of villages. The mission center moved from Bombay to Ahmednagar in 1831 because it was closer to the center of Marathi country. Schools, Boardings, Colleges and theological institutions were created by Marathi mission in late 1800, aiding famine and reaching untouchables increased Christian Converts in area.

Christians of Ahmednagar district account for nearly 10% of district's population, a significant number of whom are located in the eastern part of the district in places such as Nevasa, Pathardi, Shevgaon, Rahuri and Ahmednagar itself.

=== Palghar ===
European and American missionaries established missions in Palghar and Dahanu in Palghar district. Most of the converted Christian community from these areas are local native belong to the Second District of the Church of the Brethren (F-257 Bom).

=== Aurangabad ===
Aurangabad is home to The Diocese of Aurangabad which has its Cathedral and Bishop's House located in the Cantonment Area. The Diocese covers the whole of Marathwada and works mainly in field of Education, Health, and social work.

=== Yavatmal ===
The American Free Methodist Church maintains missions at Yavatmal, Wani, Umri, Rajur and Darwah.

=== Pune ===
The city of Pune is home to the headquarters of the Diocese of Pune. The Diocese has a significant Marathi Catholic population.

There are several Marathi Methodist, Anglican, Baptist, Seventh-Day Adventist, Church of the Nazarene, Pentecostal and Church of Christ missions across the city.

=== Kolhapur ===
The roots of Christianity in Kolhapur were laid by the Reverend Royal Gould Wilder, an American Board of Commissioners for Foreign Mission missionary. He started the mission in Kolhapur in 1853 and later established the first church in Kolhapur which now stands as Wilder Memorial Church.

The mission eventually became independent and then came under the American Presbyterian mission which established further churches in Sangli, Islampur, Panhala and other towns. These together continue under the Kolhapur Church Council.

The Church of North India has a number of churches in Kolhapur under the Diocese of Kolhapur.

== Culture ==
There are similarities of customs and culture between Hindus and Marathi Christians, such as dress, food and cuisine. The Hindu custom of wearing Saree, Mangalsutra and placing Bindis is still prominent among native Christians. Marathi Christian highly retain their Marathi culture, and they have kept their Pre-Christian surnames. In Maharashtra, great Marathi poet Narayan Wamanrao Tilak realised that a Hindu-Christian synthesis was simply not possible, unless the Christian religion had deep roots in the Indian culture. He trained the Marathi Christians to worship and sing Bhajan and Kirtan.

The Indian Constitution Scheduled Castes Order, 1950, currently stipulates that only individuals professing Hinduism, Sikhism, or Buddhism can be deemed members of a Scheduled Caste and hence reservation benefits are not given to Christians who converted from schedule caste, however The "Bombay East Indians non dalit community" was granted Other Backward Class (OBC) status by the Government of Maharashtra in 2006.

== Notable people ==
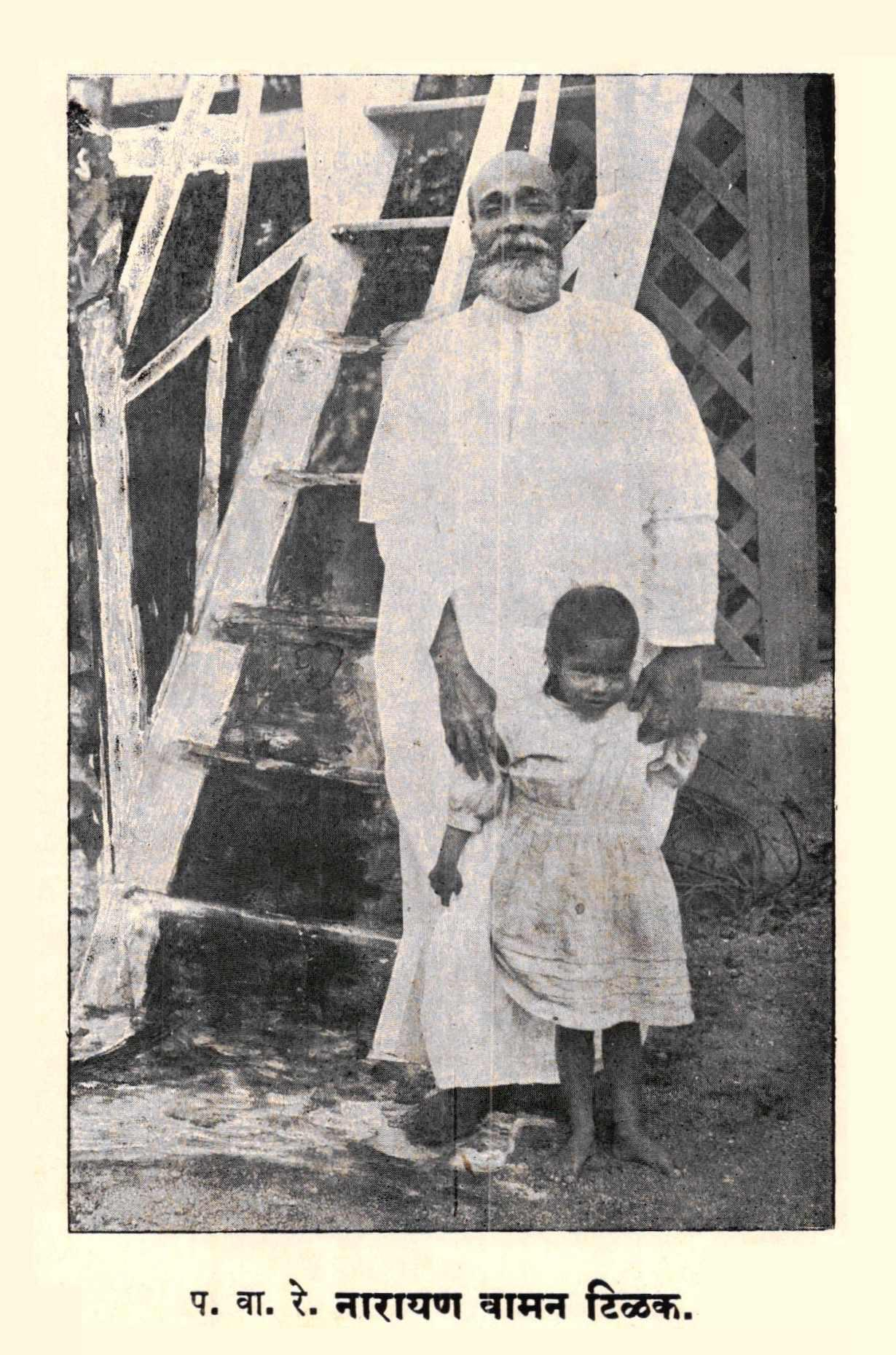
Narayan Waman Tilak

- Pandita Ramabai
- Narayan Waman Tilak
- Rajeshwari Kharat Marathi Actress. famous for movie Fandry
- Shahu Modak, a Marathi/Hindi movie actor from Ahmednagar. He primarily acted as Lord Krishna in 29 mythological films.

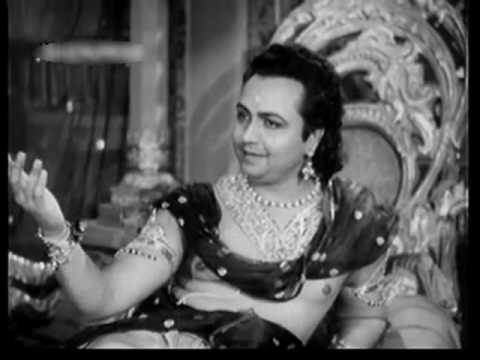
Actor Shahu Modak

- Archana Taide, actress
- Baba Padmanjii, a Brahmin and a Christian convert. An author of over 100 books, his Yamunaparyatan is considered the first novel of Marathi literature.
- Harish Salve, renowned Jurist.
- N. K. P. Salve, former Union Minister and Congress Leader from Vidarbha.
- Rajanikant Arole, Magasayse award winner and Padmabhushan.
- Chandu Borde, a former cricket player from the Pune district. He played for the Indian cricket team in 83 matches between 1958 and 1969. His younger brother Ramesh was also a noteworthy cricket player.
- Vijay Hazare, a cricket player from the Solapur district. He captained the Indian cricket team in fourteen matches between 1951 and 1953. He also captained Baroda, with whom he won the Ranji Trophy in 1959. Hazare is considered by many to be one of the best middle-order bats to play for India.
- Vinod Kambli, a former Indian international Cricketer, who played for India as a left-handed middle order batsman, as well as for Mumbai and Boland, South Africa. Kambli converted to Catholicism after his second marriage.

== See also ==
- Christianity in Maharashtra
- Kupari
- Marathi people
- Portuguese India
- List of Indian Christians
