= Bombay East Indians =

Ethno-religious Indian Christian community of Mumbai (Bombay)

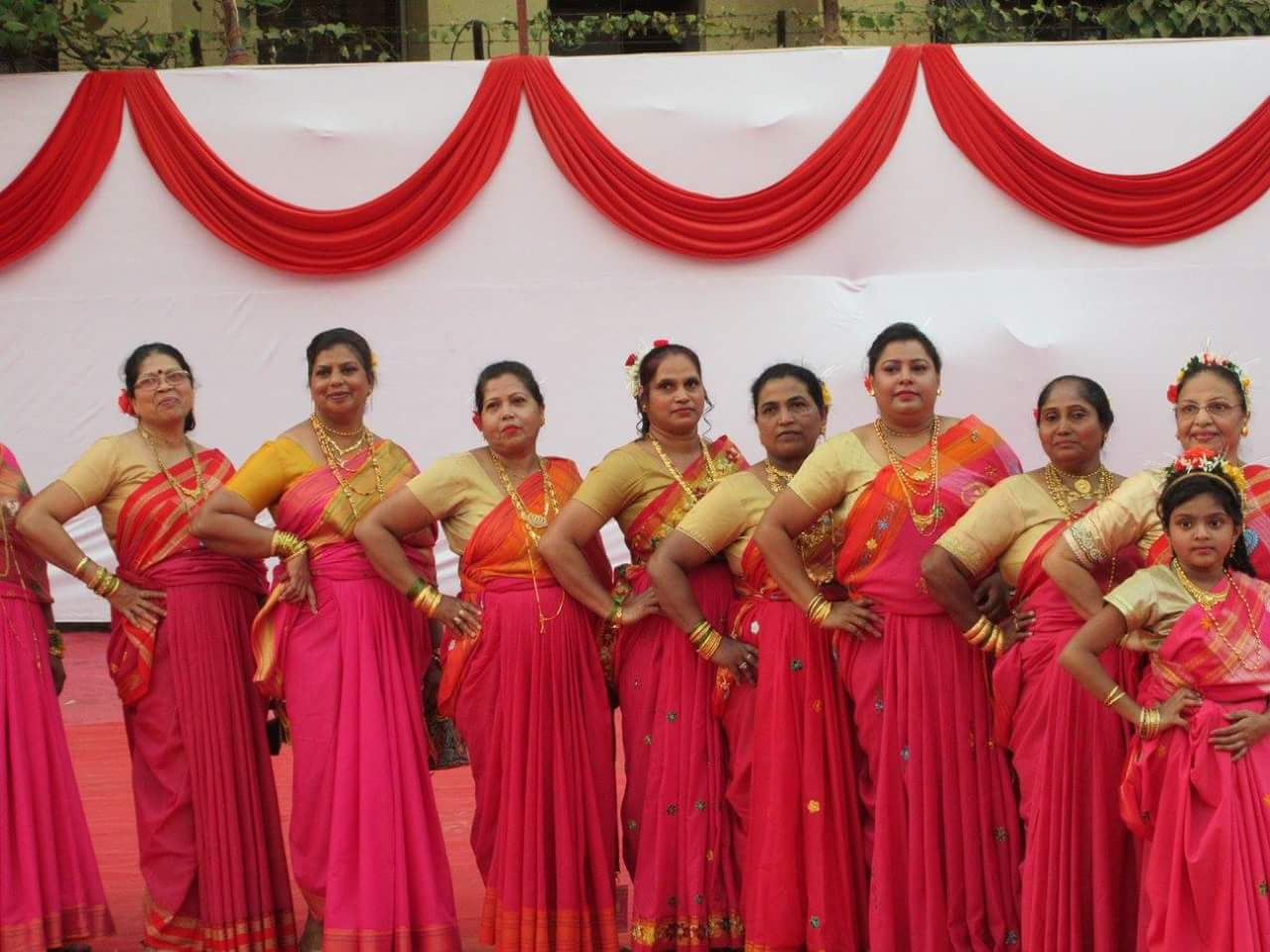
- Bombay East Indian women donning their saari (dress)

Regions with significant populations
- Mumbai metropolitan area (1960s): About 92,000

Languages
- East Indian dialects

Religion
- Christianity (Latin Catholicism)

Related ethnic groups
- Luso-Indians, Anglo-Indians, Kudali Christians, Goan Christians, Mangalorean Christians, Karwari Christians, Koli Christians, Marathi Christians & Latin Catholics of Malabar

The Bombay East Indians, also called East Indian Catholics or simply East Indians, are an ethno-religious Indian Christian community native to the Seven Islands of Bombay, the Mumbai Metropolitan Area and the northern Konkan region; along the western coast of India. The community gets its name from the Bombay East Indian Association (BEIA), established in 1887.

== History ==
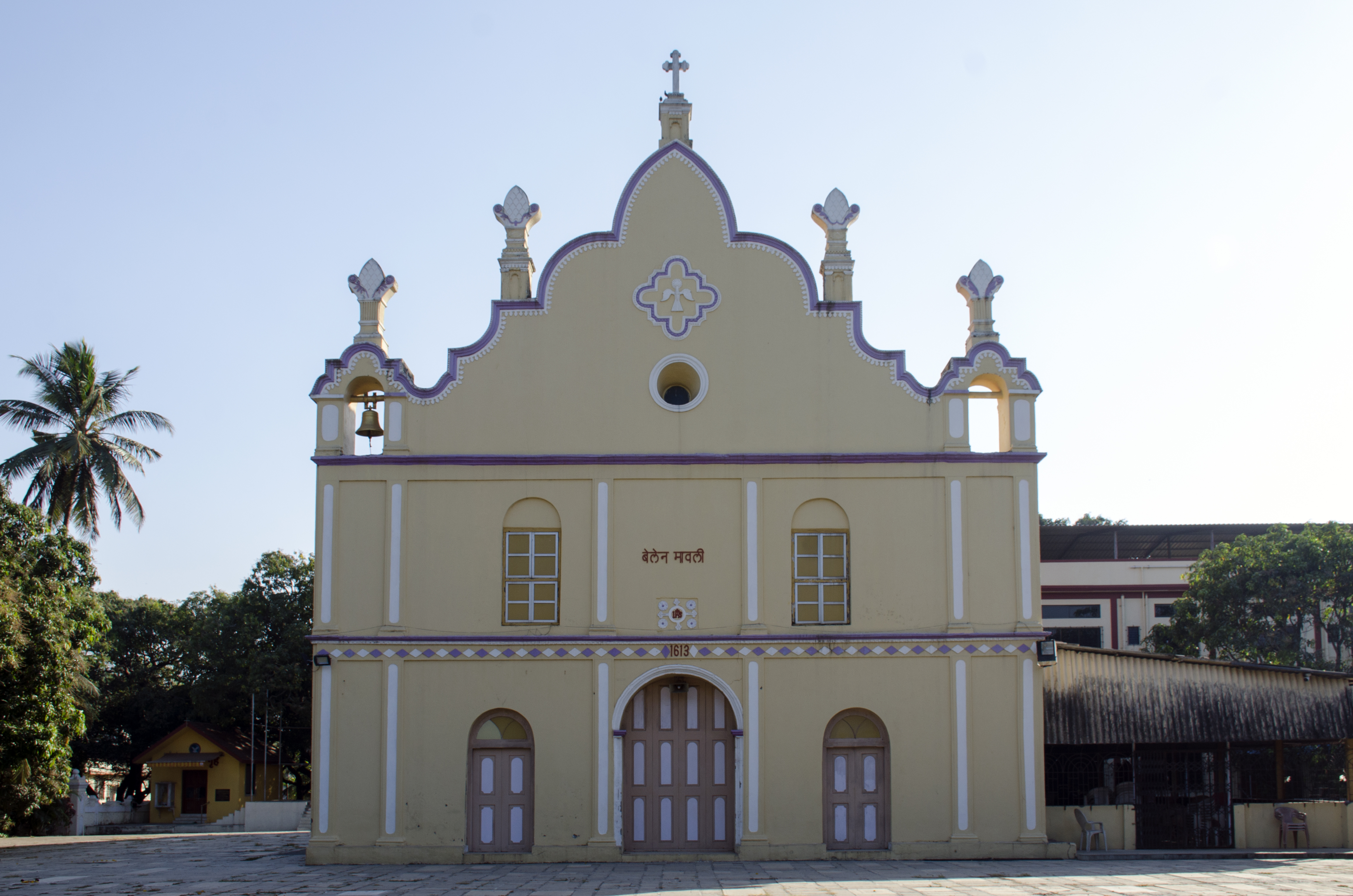
Church of Our Lady of Bethlehem

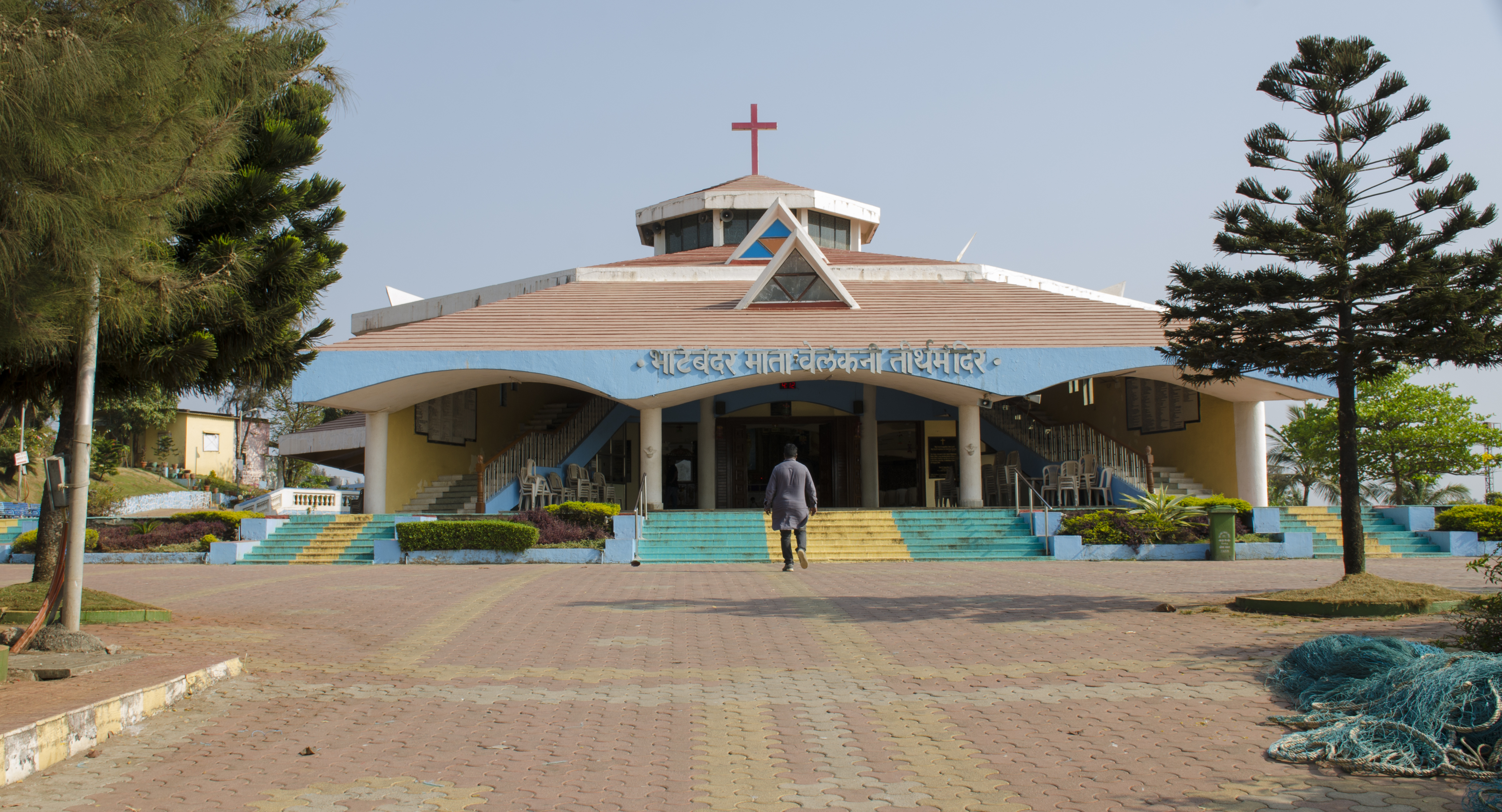
Velankanni Church, Uttan

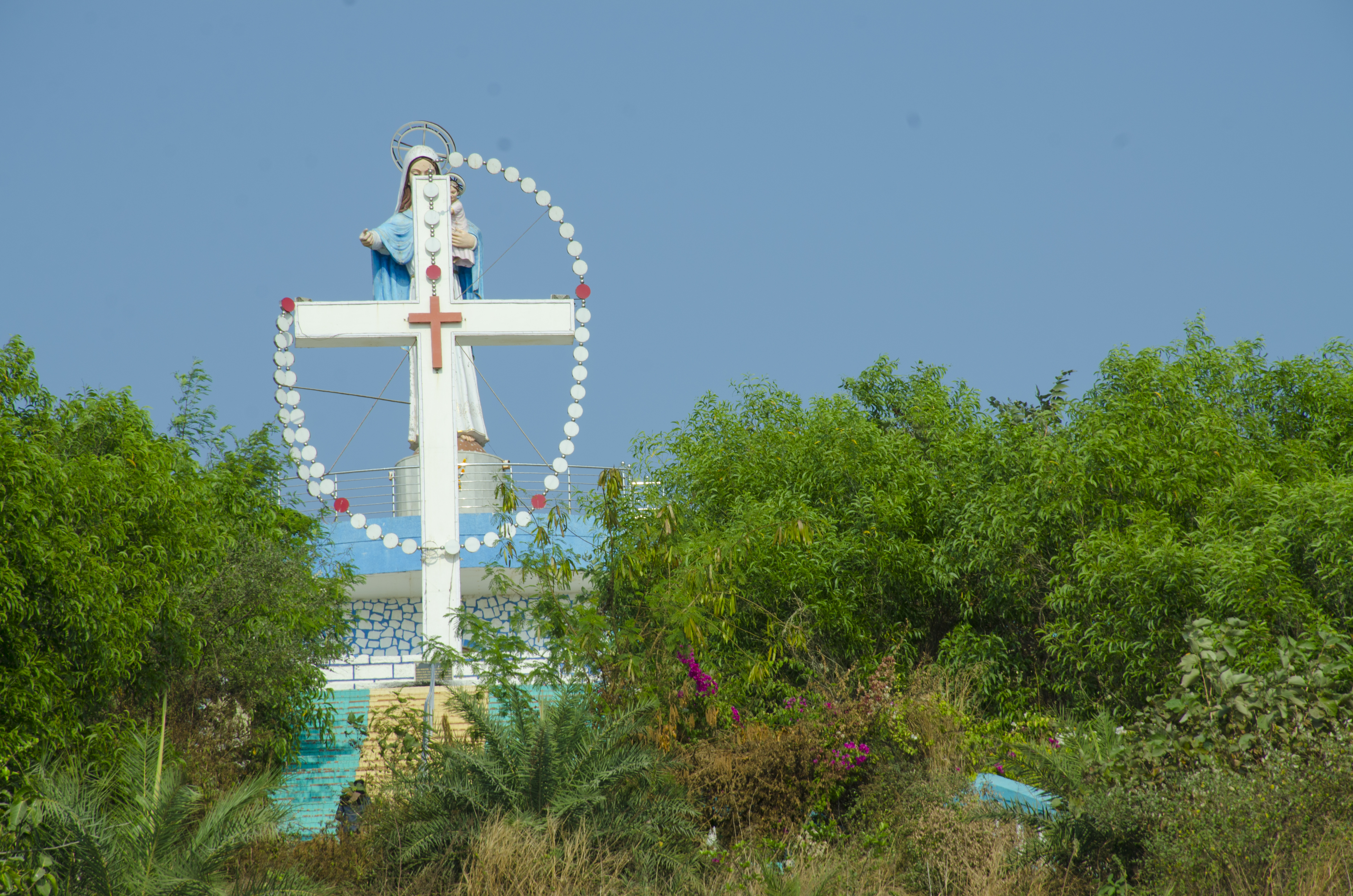
Cross near Velankanni Beach, Uttan

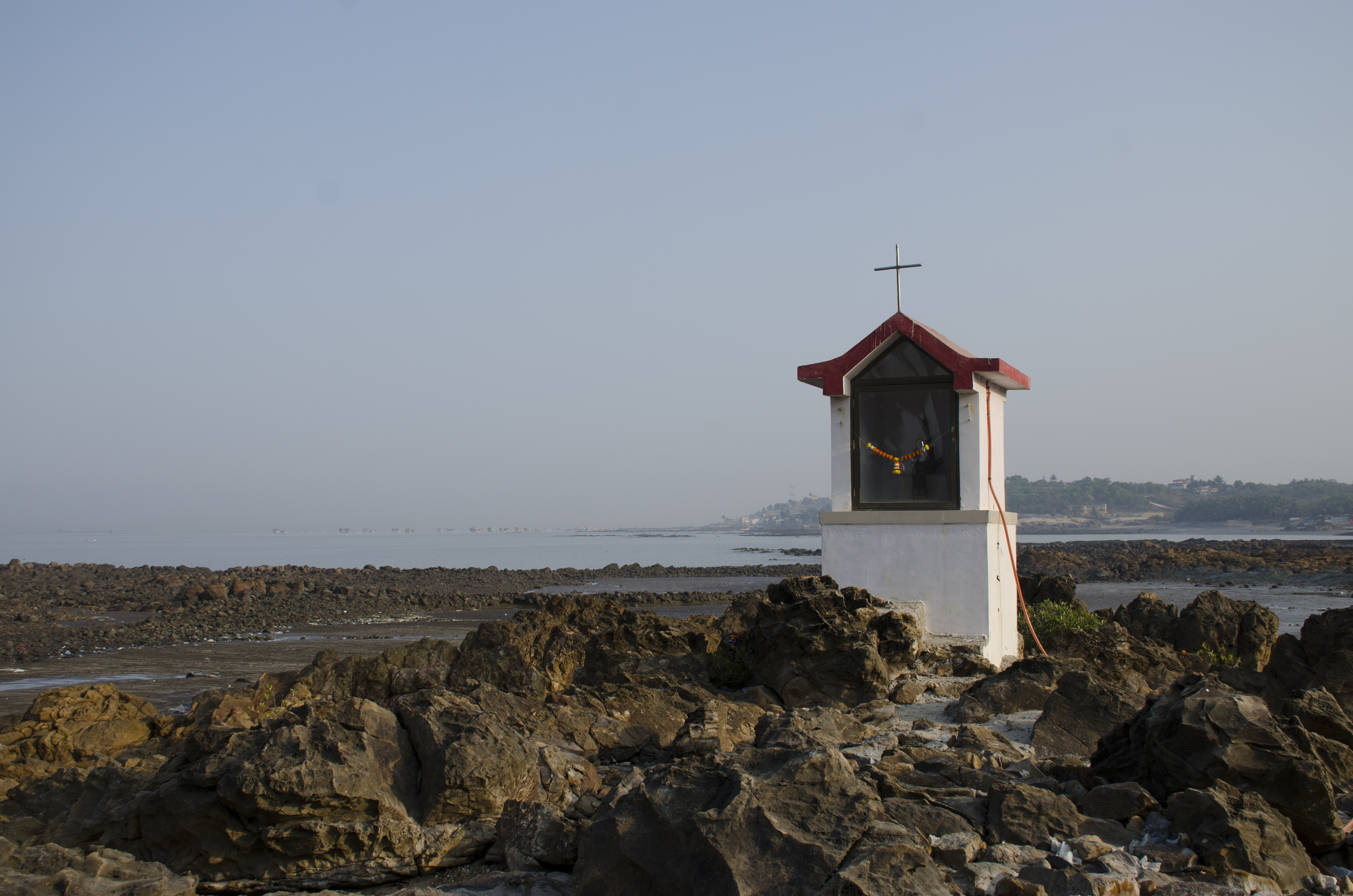
A grotto on Gorai Beach

=== Pre-Portuguese era ===
A Dominican missionary by the name Jordan de Catalunya, who was either Catalan or Occitan, began evangelising the locals in Sopara, Thana & Kalyan-Dombivli towns of north Konkan in around 1323 AD. Sopara was an ancient port and an international trading center at the time.

=== Portuguese era ===
After ushering in the Age of Discovery, Portuguese Armadas under the command of Vasco Da Gama, found their way to India in 1498 via the Cape Route. In the next few years they acquired many colonial possessions in what would become the Portuguese East Indies; their main aims were to capitalise on the spice trade and promotion of Christian missions to convert indigenous peoples, for which the Primate of the East Indies was founded. Although Brahmins and other high castes were ceremoniously converted by the Portuguese Church, and were treated with favour and distinction, most of them continued to engage in agriculture, fishing & other rural occupations handed down by their ancestors. They were given neither secular nor religious education. Among the converts were a number of descendants of the Ancient Indian Christian community reportedly founded by Bartholomew the Apostle. They coalesced into a community under Portuguese rule known as Norteiros and later as "Portuguese Christians" or "Bombay Portuguese" in British Bombay.

The Franciscans spearheaded the evangelisation of the "Province of the North" (Província do Norte) headquartered at Fort San Sebastian of Bassein, but the fort's officials were subordinate to the viceroy in the capital of Velha Goa. From 1534 to 1552, a priest by the name António do Porto converted over 10,000 people, built a dozen churches, convents, and a number of orphanages hospitals and seminaries. Prominent among the converts were two yogis from the Kanheri Caves, who became known as Paulo Raposo and Francisco de Santa Maria. They introduced Christianity to their fellow yogis, converting many in the process. Another notable convert during this period was the Brahmin astrologer Parashuram Joshi, who was baptised on the 8th of September, 1565, with the name Henrique da Cunha. Joshi's conversion was followed by that of 250 Hindus, including over 50 Brahmins. In Salsette, the priest Manuel Gomes converted over 6,000 Hindus in Bandra and was known as the Apostle of Salsette.

In 1573, 1,600 people were converted. Beginning in 1548, Jesuits in Bassein (Vasai) and Bandra converted many upper-caste Hindus; Vasai (Bassein) recorded 9,400 baptisms in 1588. The Jesuit superior Gonçalo Rodrigues baptised between 5,000 and 6,000 Hindus in Thane (Thana), many of whom were orphans or the young children of lower-caste Hindus who were sold by their parents. In 1634, Bassein had sixty-three friars, thirty Franciscans, fifteen Jesuits, ten Dominicans, and eight Augustines. By the end of the 16th century the Catholic population of the Portuguese Province of the North was 10,000 to 15,000, centered mainly in and around Bassein.

After the Province of the North came under Mahratta occupation in 1739, Christianity was under severe threat from the Peshva Brahmins & only a few churches were left in the north Konkan region. The Mahrattas imposed a heavy, discriminatory & religious tax on Christians to fund the Peshva Brahmins; because of which many Christians were converted to Hinduism. The native Bombay East Indian clergy under the Vicar General at Kurla, managed to nurse the community back to a flourishing population in what became British Bombay.

=== British and modern eras ===
Changes occurred under British rule. On 11 May 1661, the Marriage Treaty of Charles Stuart II of England and Catherine De Braganza, daughter of John IV of Portugal gave Bombay to the British Empire as intended, since the British takeover of Surat (allegedly as part of Catherine's dowry to Charles). A weakened Portugal, no longer a part of the Crown of Spain, had to oblige. Nevertheless, parts of present-day Bombay (such as Bandra, Thana district and Bassein) remained Portuguese well into the first third of the 18th century. Since the early days of the English East India Company, there were no other Indian Christians in the North Konkan except the East Indian Catholics. Employment intended for Christians was monopolised by the East Indians. With railways and steamships came immigrants from Goa who were also called "Portuguese Christians". For Queen Victoria's Golden Jubilee, the Christians of North Konkan changed their name from "Portuguese Christians" to "East Indians" to impress upon the British in Bombay, that they were the earliest British subjects in India, and were entitled to certain natural rights in comparison with immigrants.

The Bombay East Indian Association was founded on 26 May 1887 to advance the education, employment, rights and economic development of the East Indians. P F Gomes, who was knighted by Pope Leo XIII in 1888, was its first president and J L Britto its first secretary. D G D'Almeida donated ₹100,000 to establish an education fund.

During the 1960s, the Archdiocese of Bombay estimated that there were 92,000 East Indians in Bombay: 76,000 in suburban Bombay and 16,000 in the city.

== Architecture ==
A typical Koli house consists of a veranda (oli), used for repairing nets and receiving visitors; a sitting-room (angan), used by women for household work; a kitchen, a central apartment, a bedroom, a devotional room (devaghar) and a detached bathroom.

== Language and literature ==
East Indian Catholics speak the East Indian dialect of Marathi-Konkani, which they retained despite Portuguese rule. The dialect is central to the community's identity. The author of Trans Bomb Geog Soc, 1836–38, Vol I mentions the dialects spoken by the East Indians of Salsette, Mahim, Matunga & Mazgaon; similar to the dialects spoken by the Kulbis, Kolis, Bhandaris, Palshes, Pathare Prabhus, Somvanshi Kshatriya Pathares (Panchkalshis), Kuparis & Vadvals; this may have been Konkani. Some East Indian upper-class families of the Khatri ward at Thana district used to speak Bombay Portuguese. At least 110 Portuguese lexical items are found in Maharashtra sponsored Marathi.

Many of the characters in the book Bloodline Bandra by Godfrey Joseph Pereira (2014) are East Indian. The book is set in the 1950s in Pali Village.

== Occasions and festivals ==
Although the East Indians have preserved their pre-Christian Marathi-Konkani culture and traditions, many Portuguese influences have been absorbed.

== Ethnic wear ==
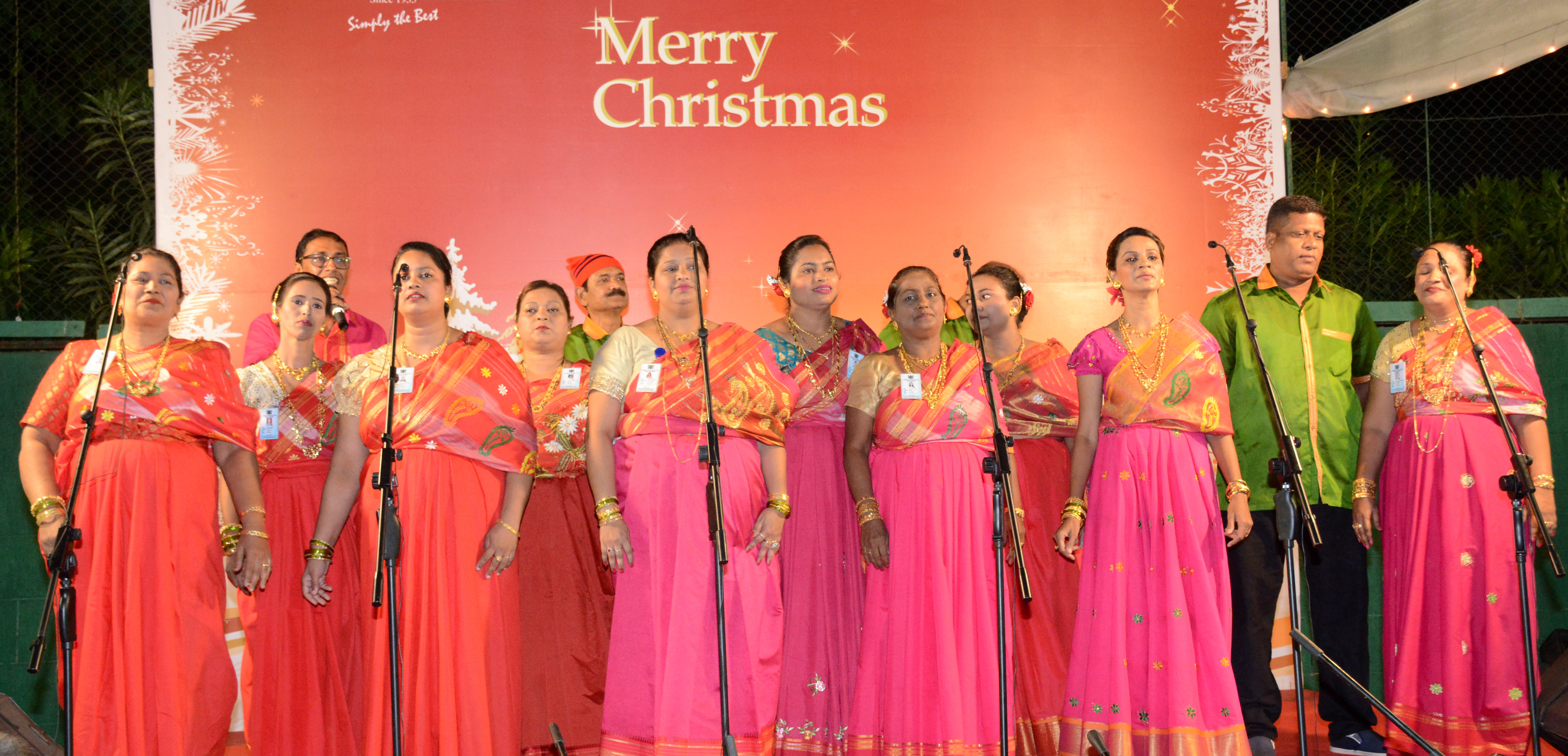
East Indian women of Chimbai village performing at Bandra Gymkhana

Traditional dress for women is the lugra. For men, traditional wear consists of khaki shorts and a white banian. A Koli Christian bridegroom usually wears an older Portuguese admiral's uniform, which is preserved and lent out for such occasions. East Indian women wore a blouse and cotton lugra, with the back pleats tucked into the waist; women did not use the upper portion of the sari (covering the head and breast) until they were married. This mode of wearing the sari is known as sakacch nesane. Gol nesane, a cylindrical style, is popular with young girls and women.

== Film industry ==
The film Tu Maza Jeev, in the East Indian language, was released on Maharashtra Day in 2009.

== Singing competition ==
Jacinto at an East Indian singing competition in Mumbai

East Indians organise singing competitions in their own language. The competition is primarily held in the evening of important village occasions; for example, Kurla has an annual competition on the eve of the phool dongri feast in May at Holy Cross Church.

== Representation and reservation ==
The East Indians were recognised as OBC (other backward Class) status by the Government of Maharashtra on 1 March 2006 by the way of official gazette. In September 2014, local non-governmental organisations such as the Watchdog Foundation, Mobai Gaothan Panchayat, the Bombay East Indian Association, Vakola Advanced Locality Management, Kalina Civic Forum and the Kolovery Welfare Association founded the Maharashtra Swaraj Party (MSP), to give voice to the community's concerns. The party, which represents the East Indian community, was expected to support five candidates from Mumbai's suburbs in the 13th Maharashtra Legislative Assembly elections.

== Notable East Indians ==
- Joseph Baptista: Indian politician and activist
- Mark Joseph Dharmai: Para-athlete (bronze medalist in the 2017 Doubles BWF Para-Badminton World Championships).
- Genelia D'Souza: Indian actress and model
- Joseph D'souza: first East Indian gazetted officer
- Adv. Vivian Dsouza: advisor of the Bombay East Indian Association
- Gavin Ferreira: Olympic hockey player
- James Ferreira: Indian fashion designer and son of hockey Olympian Owen Ferreira
- Michael Ferreira: amateur English billiards player
- Owen Ferreira: Indian hockey Olympian
- Gonsalo Garcia: Roman Catholic saint from India
- Maria Goretti: Indian blogger, chef, actress and VJ
- Loy Mendonsa: musician, part of the Shankar–Ehsaan–Loy trio
- Tulip Miranda: president of the Bombay East Indian Association
- Adv. Godfrey Pimenta: president, Watch Dog Foundation
- Simon Pimenta: Archbishop Emeritus of Bombay

== See also ==
- Norteiro people
- Kupari
- Sandori
- Portuguese Bombay
- Bombay Presidency
- Mumbai Indians
