= Sandor, Palghar =

Village in Maharashtra

Sandor
- Census town
- Nickname: Sandor Church
- Location in Maharashtra, India
- Coordinates: 19.873°N 72.714°E
- Country: India
- State: Maharashtra
- District: Palghar district
- Established: 1575

Population (2001)
  - Total: 8,336

Languages
  - Official: Marathi
- Time zone: UTC+5:30 (IST)
- Website: maharashtra.gov.in

Church of St. Thomas the Apostle
- Saint Thomas Church, Sandor-Saloli
- Church of St. Thomas the Apostle

History
- Dedication: St. Thomas the Apostle

Administration
- Diocese: 22 May 1998 Diocese of Vasai

Sandor is a census town falling within the Vasai (Bassein) municipality of the Palghar district (previously Taana district), in the Konkan division of Maharashtra, India. Sandoris, the natives of Sandor, are predominantly Roman Catholic Kshatriyas of the Christian Bombay East Indian community, they converted in the colony centred around Bassein, the richest possession of the former Portuguese East Indies with the capital at Velha Goa, in the southern edge of the Konkan region. Prior to the arrival of Portuguese Armadas, there had also been some Nestorians descended from Jewish converts, by the efforts of the apostles Thomas or Bartholomew.

== History ==
The natives of the Bassein (Vasai) are predominantly people whose culture derives from a composite of the Konkani substrate, overlaid by the Portuguese, Marathi& British rulers. The Sandoris are predominantly of the Vadval sub-ethnic group, and speak the Vadvali dialect, which is considered by the government as a dialect of Marathi, although this view is disputed.

Following the conversions of 1564, a Portuguese noblewoman, Donna Irina, had a chapel, Our Lady of Help (Nossa Senhora da Ajuda) built in the village for the converts. The first Holy Mass was held in this chapel on 11 November 1566 by the Jesuit missionaries. A Sandorian tradition states that St Gonsalo Garcia, who was martyred in Shogunate era Japan, was present as a young boy at the foundation laying ceremony of the chapel.

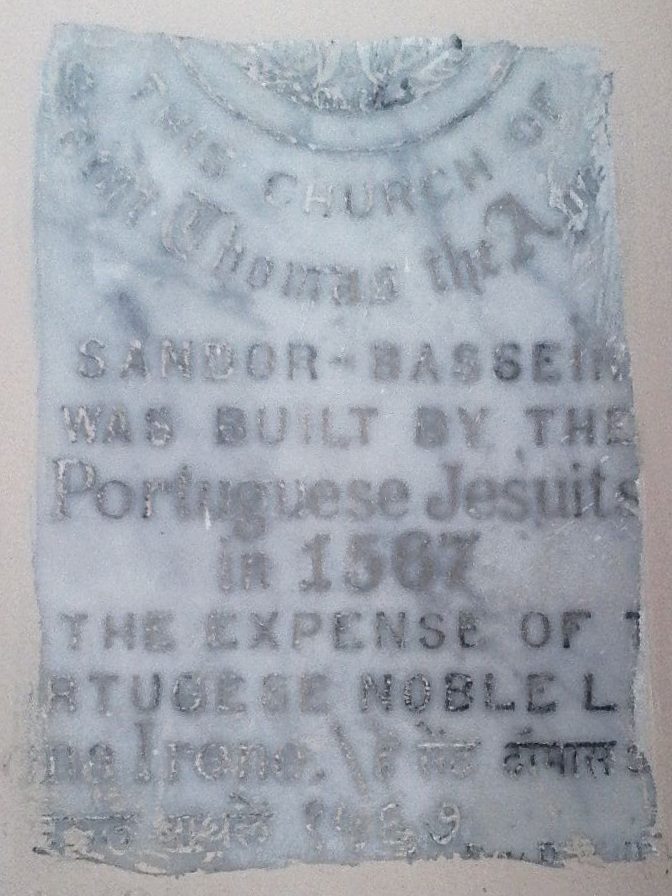
Marble slab in front of Sandor church depicting the date when the church was built

The chapel was renamed after Thomas the Apostle, when in 1565, his picture was brought from the fort and enshrined in the chapel. It seems that sometime or the other a new church was built a little further towards the north occupying the actual site on which the present edifice stands. The church was destroyed by invaders from Sultanate of Guzerat in 1571, and was reconstructed in 1573.

Pedro de Almeida, a Jesuit was appointed the 'Pai dos Cristaos' for 1574–1576, with charge of the Christians of Sandor and Papdy parishes.

In 1679, Arabs from Gujarat once again attacked and damaged the church. In 1690, a certain invader by name of 'Kakaji' also attacked and damaged the church.

The Mahratta Invasion of Bassein in 1739 did not destroy the chapel, although the Jesuits were forced to leave and it was thereafter served by the secular priests.

The chapel was enlarged in 1889. The three altars of the chapel are from one of the original churches in the Fort San Sebastian of Bassein. At some time, a cross and a grotto to Our Lady of Lourdes was added.

It is not known when the chapel was elevated to the rank of a parish church, but from the evidence, it seems to be some time before 1574.

Subsequently, the parishes of Our Lady of Remedies at Remedy, Our Lady of Grace at Papdy, Mae de Deus (Mother of God) at Palle, Our Lady of Mercy at Merces and St. Michael the Archangel at Porim (Manickpur) were carved out of it (1574–1606).

Sandor and the rest of the Vasai area were not disturbed by the intra-Catholic Padroado vs Propaganda Fide conflict, as the area remained firmly faithful to the Archbishop of Goa and refused to accept the authority of the Vicar Apostolic of Bombay and their successor, the Archbishop of Bombay.

In 1886, the northern part of the Archdiocese of Goa was carved out as the Diocese of Damaon, including the Vasai, and it was only in 1928 that the two dioceses (Damaon and Bombay) were merged, so that the Vasai area came under the Archbishops of Bombay for the first time in 1928.

At present, the parish of Sandor also serves the village of Saloli. The church celebrates its feast 9–15 December every year, and has a big feast in the evenings.

The village of Sandor has now been made part of the Municipal Corporation of Vasai-Virar.

Parish priests of St Thomas Church from the available records are as follows:

No.	Year of appointment	Name of clergy
53	1922	Fr. Nazario De Figuedo
54	1938	Fr. Paul Jacinto D'Lima
55	1945	Fr. Rock Dsouza
56	1949	Fr. Appolonius Dsouza
57	1952	Msgr. Fr. Raymond Mendes
58	1965	Msgr. Fr. Sebastian Vaz
59	1966	Msgr. Fr. Philip Tavares
60	1974	Fr. Bernard Bhandari
61	1983	Bishop Edwin Colaso
62	1986	Fr. Elias Rodrigues
63	1991	Fr. Michael Dsouza
64	1997	Fr. Elias Dcunha
65	1999	Fr. Nazareth Gabru
66	2002	Fr. Cajetan Rodrigues
67	2008	Fr. Francis D'Britto
68	2014	Fr. John Fargose
69	2021	Fr. Thomas Lopes

Below is a list of assistant priests :

No.	Year of appointment	Name of Clergy
27	1928	Fr. Antonio Colaso / Jerry Pius
28	1935	Fr. J.P. Pimenta
29	1938	Fr. J. B. Crasto
30	1939	Fr. Joseph Misquitta
31	1942	Fr. Sebastian Vaz
32	1946	Fr. Clevin Vaz
33	1949	Fr. Philip Tavares
34	1950	Fr. John Fernandes
35	1952	Fr. Rudolph Dsouza
36	1953	Fr. Simon Dsouza
37	1954	Fr. Joseph Gonsalves
38	1956	Fr. Nelson Corriea
39	1958	Fr. Gilbert Rego
40	1959	Fr. Philip Tavares
41	1959	Fr. Trevor Dsouza
42	1959	Fr. Alvaro Rego
43	1960	Fr. Bernard Bhandari
44	1962	Fr. Rodney Esperance
45	1963	Fr. Bernard Bhandari
46	1964	Fr. Richard Misquitta
47	1965	Fr. Mark Misquitta
48	1965	Fr. Edward Dsouza
49	1965	Fr. Simon Dsouza
50	1970	Fr. Rock Kini
51	1971	Fr. Peter Bombacha
52	1971	Fr. Vincent Monteiro
53	1972	Fr. Nazareth Gabru
54	1974	Fr. Barthol Machado
55	1974	Fr. Vincent Dias
56	1977	Fr. Godfrey Remedios
57	1983	Fr. William Ferreira
58	1983	Fr. Joe Gonsalves
59	1986	Fr. Wilson Rebello
60	1986	Fr. Alex Tuscano
61	1986	Fr. Michael D'costa
62	1991	Fr. Raymond Tuscano
63	1991	Bishop Elias Gonsalves
64	1993	Fr. Baptist Pereira
65	1998	Fr. Robin Dias
66	1998	Fr. Philip Lopes
67	1998	Fr. Julian Misquitta
68	1999	Fr. Prakash Raut
69	1999	Fr. Vijay Almeida
70	2000	Fr. Abraham Gomes
71	2000	Fr. Johnson Menezes
72	2003	Fr. Maxwell Furtado
73	2003	Fr. Joe Almeida
74	2004	Fr. Prakash Rumao
75	2006	Fr. Vijay Crasto
76	2006	Fr. James Dsilva
77	2007	Fr. Henry Pereira
78	2007	Fr. Robin Gonsalves
79	2008	Fr. Philip Gonsalves
80	2008	Fr. Michael Correia
81	2009	Fr. Ceaser Dabre
82		

== Demographics ==
As of 2001 India census, Sandor had a population of 8336. Males constitute 51% of the population and females 49%. Sandor has an average literacy rate of 78%, higher than the national average of 59.5%: male literacy is 83%, and female literacy is 73%. In Sandor, 10% of the population is under 6 years of age.

== Church based charity/social organizations ==
Started in 1971 under the leadership of Very Rev. late Msgr. Philip Tavares the then parish priest of the Church. This society is a part of Society of St. Vincent de Paul, Paris, France, an international organization of Roman Catholic lay men and women of all ages, whose primary mission is to help the poor and less fortunate.

Founded in 1833 by Frederick Ozanam, a French lawyer, author, and professor in the Sorbonne University of Paris to help impoverished people living in the slums of Paris, France.

The Society numbers about 950,000 in some 132 countries worldwide, whose members operate through "conferences". A conference may be based out of a church, community center, school, hospital, etc., and is composed of Catholic volunteers.

== Schools ==
- Carmelite Convent English High School, Sandor, Vasai west 401201
- St. Thomas High School, Sandor
- Notre Dame School

== See also ==
- Bombay East Indians
- Norteiro people
