= Maharashtra Swaraj Party =

- Leader: Godfrey Pimenta
- Spokesperson: Alphi Dsouza
- Founded: September 2014
- Headquarters: Mumbai

Election symbol
- Nib with 7 rays

Website
- www.mahaswaraj.com

Maharashtra Swaraj Party (MSP) is a regional political party formed by the Christian community native to Mumbai (Bombay) city and the Greater Bombay Metropolitan Area, in the Konkan division of India. The party's name draws inspiration from the phrase "Swaraj is my birthright", coined by a Bombay East Indian freedom fighter and Mumbai's first mayor of Indian origin, Joseph "Kaka" Baptista. Baptista was an associate and a confidant of Lokmanya Tilak who made the phrase popular. The organisation, aimed at representing the East Indian community, was initiated by various local NGO's like Watchdog Foundation, Mobai Gaothan Panchayat, Bombay East Indian Association, Vakola Advanced Locality Management, Kalina Civic Forum& the Kolovery Welfare Association. MSP plans expand to the rest of Maharashtra.

== 2014 Maharashtra Assembly Election ==
The party fielded five candidates from Mumbai's suburbs in the 13th Maharashtra Legislative Assembly election. Since the organisation is not registered as a political party, the candidates were fielded as independents.

Names of candidates announced by the party include:

- Advocate Godfrey Pimenta - Vile Parle Vidhan Sabha Constituency
- Advocate Vivian D’souza - Kalina Vidhan Sabha Constituency
- Advocate Shane Cardoz - Bandra (W) Vidhan Sabha Constituency
- Ashish Fernandes - Dahisar Vidhan Sabha Constituency
- Tony Dsouza - Malad (W) Vidhan Sabha Constituency.
