= Lakshmibai Tilak =

Marathi Writer

Lakshmibai Tilak (1868–1936) was a Marathi writer from Maharashtra, India.

== Life ==
Lakshmibai Tilak was married to Narayan Waman Tilak, at the age of 11, as per the social customs of the time; they lived apart until she was 21.

Narayan Waman Tilak was an accomplished poet. He gave his wife, the young Lakshmibai a basic formal education, to the extent where she could read and write basic Marathi. Lakshmibai was shocked and devastated when her husband converted to Christianity, however after some time, overcame her distaste for his conversion and became a Christian herself.

She details her religious journey and narrates this story in a simple manner in her book Step By Step. With much encouragement from her husband, despite her rudimentary education, Lakshmibai Tilak also composed some excellent poetry. She also wrote an autobiography, titled Smritichitre (स्मृतिचित्रे; Literal translation - Memoirs). This is considered to be a paramount example of Marathi Literature. This autobiography was published in four parts, in between the years 1934 and 1935. It was translated into English by E. Josephine Inkster in the year 1950 under the title I Follow After.

In 1910, Narayan Waman Tilak started composing an epic in Marathi, describing the works of Jesus Christ, called Khristayana (क्रिस्तायन). However, he only wrote 10 chapters before dying in 1919. Lakshmibai completed the epic, by adding 64 chapters of her own.

== Bibliography ==
=== Primary ===
- Tilak, Laksmibai. Smrtichitren. Serialized in the weekly Sanjivani.
- Tilak, Laksmibai. Smrtichitren, Part 1. 15 December 1934.
- Tilak, Laksmibai. Smrtichitren, Part 2. 1935.
- Tilak, Laksmibai. Smrtichitren, Part 3, 1936.
- Tilak, Laksmibai. Smrtichitren, Part 4. 15 December 1935. [or 1937?] 7 impressions up to 1953.
- Tilak, Laksmibai. Smrtichitren. Abridged version, ed. K.B. Devale. Mumbai, 1940.
- Tilak, Laksmibai. I Follow After. English tr. of Part 1 by E. Josephine Inkster. London / Madras: Oxford University Press, 1950. 353 pp.
- Tilak, Laksmibai. Smrtichitren. Abridged version, Sahitya Akademi, Mumbai, 1958, 1968.
- Tilak, Laksmibai. Sampurna Smrtichitren. Parts 1–4. Abhinava avrtti, ed. Ashok D. Tilak. 1st ed. 1973.
- Tilak, Laksmibai. Smrtichitren. Abridged version, ed. H.A. Bhave, Varda Prakashan, Pune, 1987. Second impression / edition 1989.
- Tilak, Laksmibai. Sampurna Smrtichitren. Parts 1–4. Abhinava avrtti, ed. Ashok D. Tilak. 2nd ed. 1989.
- Tilak, Laksmibai and Devadatta Tilak. Sampurna Smritichitren. Ed. Ashok Devadatta Tilak. 3rd revised ed. Mumbai: Popular Prakashan, 1996. Containing all 4 parts, plus other scholarly apparatus (introduction, notes, index).
- Tilak, Laksmibai. I follow after: An Autobiography. Delhi: OUP, 1998.
- Tilak, Laksmibai. (Sanksipta) Smrtichitren. Ed. Devadatta Narayan Tilak. Mumbai: Popular Prakashan, 2000. (1st ed. 1958, 4th ed. 1996).
- Tilak, Laksmibai. Bharali Ghagar. Ed. K.B. Devale. Mumbai, 1948.
- Tilak, Laksmibai. 'Agadi Step by Step.' Testimony of Lakshmibai Tilak in her own words. Ed. Ashok Devdatt Tilak. Nashik: Mayawati A. Tilak, Shantisadan, 1968.

=== Secondary ===
- George, Anthony D. Svatantryapurvakalatila Dharmantarita Khristi Vyaktinci Atmanivedane Samajika Ani Vangmayina Abhyasa. Mumbai: Mumbai Vidyapeeth, 2007. [PhD. submitted to Bombay University on Marathi converts to Christianity of the Pre-Independence (1947) era.]
