= Yamuna Paryatan =

Novel written by Baba Padmanji

- Cover of the book
- Author: Baba Padmanji
- Original title: यमुनापर्यटन
- Language: Marathi
- Subject: Social, Religious, Missionary
- Genre: Novel
- Publisher: Snehvardhan Prakashan, Pune
- Publication date: 1857
- Publication place: India
- Pages: 124
- ISBN: 81-85601-25-9

Yamuna Paryatan (Marathi: यमुनापर्यटन, English: Yamuna's journey) is a Marathi novel written by Marathi Christian missionary Baba Padmanji. It was published in 1857. The book praises the teachings of Christianity by describing the miserable condition of Hindu widows in the nineteenth century AD. Yamuna Paryatan was among the earliest novels written in India. It had a female-centric theme, which addressed the issue of women's condition in Hindu society. It gained nationwide attention due to the topic it discussed. It is also known for being the first vernacular-Marathi novel.

== Plot ==
The novel portrays the story of Yamuna, the protagonist, who is a young widow in a Hindu family. She undergoes many experiences during her travels. As a result of her disillusionment with Hindu philosophy, she accepts Christianity in the end.

== Reception ==
When the book was published in 1857, it received a mixed response. The book was published in multiple editions and was also included in the curriculum of Bombay University. In 2002, Bhalchandra Nemade, a noted Marathi writer and critic, praised the novel calling it the first example of 'realistic' writing in Marathi fiction that was much ahead of its times.

As a columnist writing for Daily News and Analysis, Makarand Paranjape says, "Texts as varied as Yamuna Paryatan in Marathi and Indulekha in Malayalam championed a much more assertive position for women in the new India."

Although the novel was an enormous success, it received harsh criticism from critics and Hindu readers who accused it of masquerading. In 1979, Keshav Sitaram Karhadkar records how Baba Padmanji's critics celebrated later novels, like Lakshmanshastri Halbe's Muktamala in 1861 as the first "real" Marathi novel, criticizing the Christian feminism of Yamuna Paryatan as false-sounding and vulgar for its portrayals of widowhood and sexuality.

In 2002, Rajul Sogani in her book on widowhood, called it a pioneering treatise on the suffering of widows, but it was not well received by Hindus because of its allegedly Christian nature.

== See also ==
- Hindu Widows' Remarriage Act, 1856
