= Dnyanodaya =

Dnyanodaya is a Marathi periodical published by the American Marathi Mission, a Protestant missionary group.

== History ==
The magazine was first published in 1842 from the American Marathi mission's headquarters in Ahmadnagar in present day Indian state of Maharashtra. In early years it was published weekly but has since been turned into a monthly. The magazine included essays on Christianity, and attacks on Hindu superstitions. The magazine also had articles on secular subjects such as medicine, geography and natural history. Through the secular subjects, the magazine wanted to portray scientific world view, material development, and secular values of the Western nations with that of Christian religion. The magazine devoted several articles on criticizing Hindu caste system and the brahmin's role in perpetuating inequality. Marathi social reformer Jyotiba Phule was an early subscriber of the magazine. He borrowed heavily from Christian missionaries in his rhetoric against orthodox Hinduism. The magazine also gave platform to Phule's polemics on brahmin dominated Hindu society of that era. In the 1880s and 1890s, the magazine published views which were critical of the opinions of the Christian convert Pandita Ramabai.

== Notable Editors ==
Henry Balentine edited the periodical from 1842 to 1845 and again from 1858 to 1865. Other American missionaries who edited the Marathi periodical for many years included Robert Wilson Hume, Dr Samuel Fairback, Dr Allen Hazen, Charles Park, Edward Hume, Robert Hume and Justin E Abbot. Shahu Daji Kukade was the first Indian editor of the periodical from 1867 to 1872. Veteran Marathi poet and Christian convert, Narayan Waman Tilak was a frequent contributor to the magazine and became the magazine editor in 1912. The magazine was later edited by Devdatta Tilak and Bhaskar Pandurang Hiwale, founder of Ahmednagar College.

== See also ==
- Marathi Christians
