= Swaraj =

Self-rule concept and movement in India

Swaraj flag, Used widely during the Indian Independence Movement

Swarāj (IAST: svarāja, lit. 'self-rule') can mean, generally self-governance or self-rule. The earliest use of the term is attributed to Shivaji in the context of Hindavi Swarajya and the phrase lies at the heart of his legacy. However, scholars are divided on the authenticity of the specific document recording Shivaji's use of the phrase. Regardless of such controversies, the document was widely used to construct a cohesive narrative of Maharashtrian and Indian nationalism, framing Shivaji not just as a Maharashtrian hero, but as a visionary builder of a sovereign nation state.

Swarajya was used, in its modern political sense, as early as 1852. A mention of that term appears in the Anglo-Marathi journal or the periodical Dnyanodaya (The Dnyanodaya, Bombay, 1852, vol. xi, pp. 154–155). Swaraj was also used synonymously with home rule. Mahatma Gandhi's 1909 book Hind Swaraj or Indian Home Rule, which describes Gandhi's views about Indian independence, uses swaraj as an Indian equivalent for the Irish/British concept of home rule. However, Gandhi reinterprets that term in his book. His Swaraj lays stress on governance, not by a hierarchical government, but by self-governance through individuals and community building. The focus is on political decentralisation. Since this is against the political and social systems followed by Britain, Gandhi's concept of Swaraj advocated India's discarding British political, economic, bureaucratic, legal, military, and educational institutions. S. Satyamurti, Chittaranjan Das and Motilal Nehru were among a contrasting group of Swarajists who laid the foundation for parliamentary democracy in India.

Although Gandhi's aim of totally implementing the concepts of Swaraj in India was not achieved, the voluntary work organisations which he founded for this purpose did serve as precursors and role models for people's movements, voluntary organisations, and some of the non-governmental organisations that were subsequently launched in various parts of India. The student movement against oppressive local and central governments, led by Jayaprakash Narayan, Udit Swaraj and the Bhoodan movement, which presaged demands for land reform legislation throughout India, and which ultimately led to India's discarding of the Zamindari system of land tenure and social organisation, were also inspired by the ideas of Swaraj.

== Key concepts ==
K.T. Telang, a founder of the Indian National Congress and a Hindu jurist and reformer, used the term swaraj to translate the term local self-government. In his view, Sthanik Swaraj was the basis for Indian political reforms. Bal Gangadhar Tilak also used the expression "swaraj" prior to its mention by Dadabhai Navroji in 1906.

Swaraj aims towards a stateless society. According to Mahatma Gandhi, the overall impact of the state on the people is harmful. He called the state a "soulless machine" which, ultimately, does the greatest harm to mankind. The purpose of the state is that it is an instrument for the service of the people. However, Gandhi feared that a state moulded with such an aim would ultimately revoke the rights of the citizens and seize the role of grand protector, and would demand total compliance from them. This would create a paradoxical situation where the citizens would be alienated from the state and at the same time enslaved to it, which, according to Gandhi, was demoralising and dangerous. If Gandhi's close acquaintance with the working of the state apparatus in South Africa and in India strengthened his suspicion of a centralised, monolithic state, his intimate association with the Congress and its leaders confirmed his fears about the corrupting influence of political power and his scepticism about the efficacy of the party systems of power politics (due to which he resigned from the Congress on more than one occasion only to be persuaded back each time) and his study of the British parliamentary systems convinced him that representative democracy was incapable of meting out justice to people.

Gandhi thought it necessary to evolve a mechanism to achieve the twin objectives of empowering the people and 'empowering' the state. It was for this that he developed the two pronged strategy of resistance (to the state) and reconstruction (through voluntary and participatory social action).

Although the word Swaraj means "self-rule", Gandhi gave it the content of an integral revolution that encompasses all spheres of life: "At the individual level Swaraj is vitally connected with the capacity for dispassionate self-assessment, ceaseless self-purification and growing self-reliance." Politically, Swaraj is self-government and not good government (for Gandhi, good government is no substitute for self-government) and it means a continuous effort to be independent of government control, whether it is foreign government or whether it is national. In other words, it is the sovereignty of the people based on pure moral authority. Economically, Swaraj means full economic freedom for the toiling millions. And in its fullest sense, Swaraj is much more than freedom from all restraints, it is self-rule, and could be equated with moksha or salvation.

Adopting Swaraj means implementing a system whereby the state machinery is virtually nil, and the real power directly resides in the hands of people. Gandhi said: "Power resides in the people, they can use it at any time." This philosophy rests inside an individual who has to learn to be master of his own self and spreads upwards to the level of his community which must be dependent only on itself. Gandhi said: "In such a state (where Swaraj is achieved) everyone is his own ruler. He rules himself in such a manner that he is never a hindrance to his neighbour." He summarised the core principle like this: "It is Swaraj when we learn to rule ourselves."

Gandhi explained his vision in 1946:

Independence begins at the bottom... A society must be built in which every village has to be self-sustained and capable of managing its own affairs... It will be trained and prepared to perish in the attempt to defend itself against any onslaught from without... This does not exclude dependence on and willing help from neighbours or from the world. It will be a free and voluntary play of mutual forces... In this structure composed of innumerable villages, there will be ever-widening, never-ascending circles. Growth will not be a pyramid with the apex sustained by the bottom. But it will be an oceanic circle whose center will be the individual. Therefore, the outermost circumference will not wield power to crush the inner circle but will give strength to all within and derive its own strength from it.

Gandhi was undaunted by the task of implementing such a utopian vision in India. He believed that by transforming enough individuals and communities, society at large would change. He said: "It may be taunted with the retort that this is all Utopian and, therefore not worth a single thought... Let India live for the true picture, though never realised in its completeness. We must have a proper picture of what we want before we can have something approaching it."

== After Gandhi ==
After Gandhi's assassination, Vinoba Bhave formed the Sarva Seva Sangh at the national level and Sarvodya Mandals at the regional level to the carry on integrated village service—with the end purpose of achieving the goal of Swaraj. Two major nonviolent movements for socio-economic and political revolution in India: the Bhoodan movement led by Vinoba Bhave and the Total Revolution Movement led by Jayaprakash Narayan were actually formed under the aegis of the ideas of Swaraj.

Gandhi's model of Swaraj was almost entirely discarded by the Indian government. He had wanted a system of a classless, stateless direct democracy. Yet during the Second Five-Year Plan, the Indian government initiated a hierarchy of local village leaders, called the Panchayati Raj, modified in 1992 with the intent to devolve decision-making to the villages.

Under Nehru India turned to a socialist model of industrial development, became a leader of non-aligned countries (those refusing to side in the Cold War), and formed an alliance with the Soviet Union (although domestically firmly rejecting Marxism–Leninism). For many decades following independence English was spoken by about 2–3% of the population, however, its use began to increase, dramatically in the 1980s. India does continue with appropriated elements of the British common law, and its rail system was built out from that left by Britain. India is a member of the British-organised Commonwealth of Nations. India successfully practices a democracy with regular elections inspired by western countries. Following Gandhi independent India worked to increase the status of women, who became citizens with the franchise and the right to divorce.

== Present day ==
The Aam Aadmi Party was founded in late 2012, by Arvind Kejriwal and some erstwhile activists of India Against Corruption movement, with the aim of empowering people by applying the concept of Swaraj enunciated by Gandhi, in the present day context by changing the system of governance.

== See also ==
- Aundh Experiment
- Opposition to the partition of India
- Sarvodaya
- Swadeshi movement
