= Tu Maza Jeev =

- Directed by: Ranjan Singh
- Produced by: Nelson Patel
- Starring: Shalmali Kholgade; Rutwig Vaidya
- Production company: Godnels Studios
- Distributed by: Elvis Multimedia
- Release date: 1 May 2009
- Running time: 2 h 26 minutes
- Country: India
- Budget: ₹ 4 lakhs

Tu Maza Jeev (Marathi: तू माझा जीव, You Are My Life) is a 2009 East Indian language film directed by Ranjan Singh and produced by Nelson Patel. It features Shalmali Kholgade and Rutwig Vaidya in the lead roles.

Tu Maza Jeev was released on 1 May 2009 in order to coincide with Maharashtra Day and had 2,500 viewers in its first week of release. This audience grew by 65% the following week.
