= International Christian Fellowship =

Evangelical organization

- Classification: Protestant
- Orientation: Charismatic
- Theology: Evangelicalism
- Region: 12 countries
- Origin: 1990; Zürich, Switzerland
- Congregations: 40
- Official website: www.icf.church

International Christian Fellowship (ICF) is an international charismatic Christian association of churches. The headquarters is located in Zürich, Switzerland.

== History ==
ICF was founded in 1990 by Heinz Strupler. In 1996, leadership was taken over by Leo Bigger and Matthias Bölsterli, who emphasized an international policy of expansion. Around 2005, worship attendance at the Zürich church was 2,000 participants. In 2017, it was 3,500. In 2020, it would have more than 40 associated churches in 12 countries. ICF has 4 Bible Colleges, ICF College.

== Beliefs ==
The association has a charismatic confession of faith.

== Small groups ==
Senior pastor Leo Bigger (b. 1968) with his wife Susanne introduced a hierarchical structure of groups, called "g|12", consisting of groups of 12 people of which every group leader was a group member in the superordinate group, terminating in the group led by Bigger. In 2004, official terminology was changed from "g|12" to "SmallGroup". The graphical representation was changed from presenting the Bigger couple at the center of a circle instead of at the top of a pyramid, but the topological structure of the system remains unchanged. "g|12" is conceived as a pyramid scheme, urging each group member to strive to become the leader of a derivative group. The one who serves the others best shall be their leader. Small groups are set in place to promote group discussion on biblical principles. Members are encouraged to start new groups if their own group becomes too large to the point of fair discussion being jeopardized.
