= Narayan Vaman Tilak =

Marathi poet

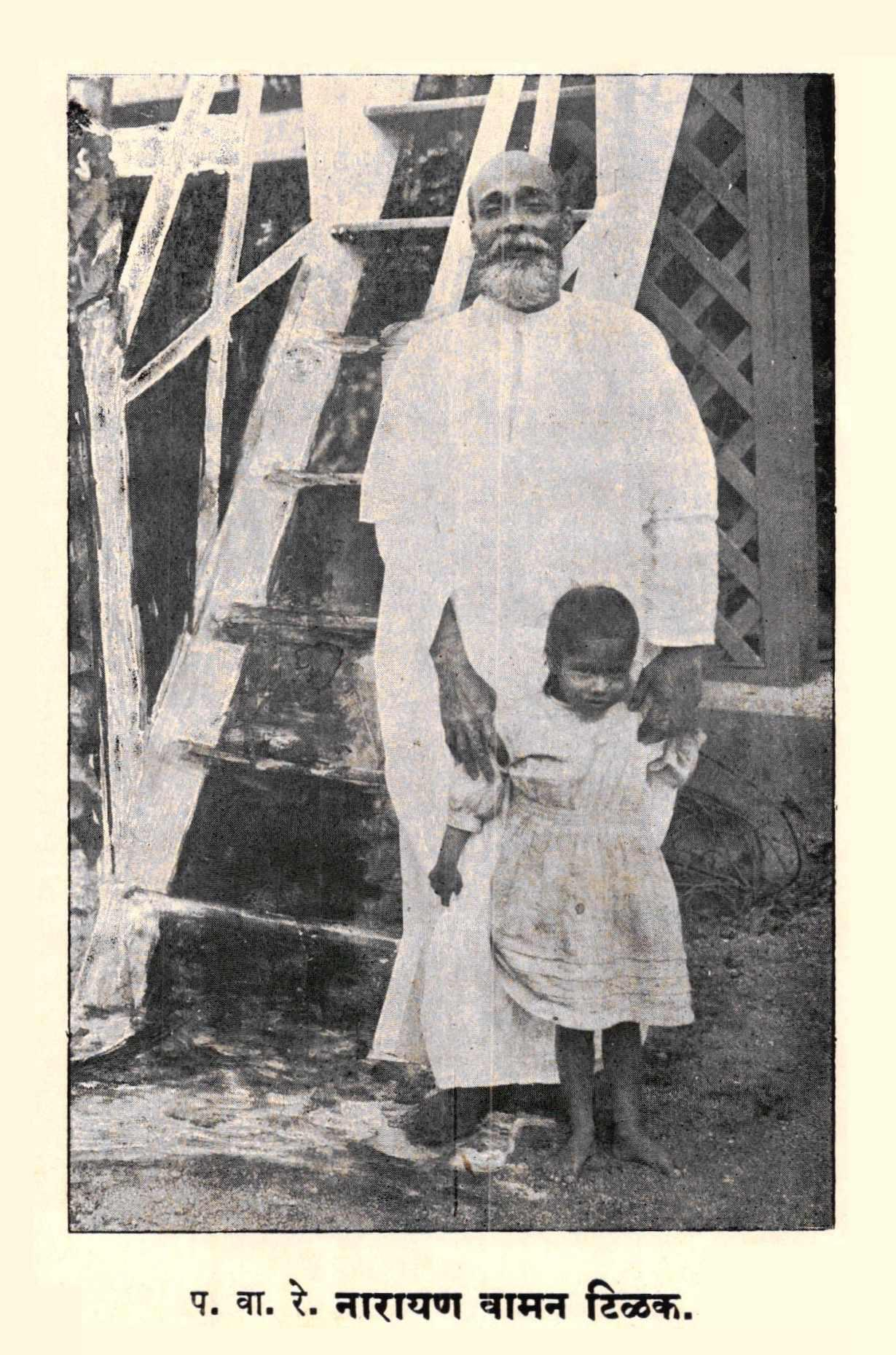
- Born: December 6, 1861
- Died: May 9, 1919 (aged 57)

Narayan Vaman Tilak (6 December 1861 – 9 May 1919) was a Marathi poet from the Konkan region of then Bombay Presidency in British India, and a famous convert to Christianity from the Hindu Chitpavan Brahmin Community.

== Early life ==
Narayan Tilak was born into a Hindu Kokanastha Chitpavan Brahmin family on 6 December 1861 in the village of Karajhgaon in Ratnagiri District of Bombay Presidency. From 1869–1873, he studied elementary school in the town of Kalyan near Mumbai, and for the next two years (1874–76), studied primarily Sanskrit and Marathi literature, especially poetry, under Ganeshshastri Lele in Bhatjicha Math, Nashik. Then, after two years (1877–79) at the Nashik High School, learning English and other school subjects, before completing his matriculation examination, he terminated his studies, undertaking a modest job as a teacher to support himself some of his siblings and relatives.

Tilak's growth and development as a Hindu born in colonial India was entirely along traditional Hindu religious and social lines. He was a close relative of Lokmanya Bal Gangadhar Tilak. (See Devdatt Narayan Tilak's booklet which consists of a report on the celebration of Tilak's birth centenary). Unlike many of his Chitpavan Hindu caste fellows, (such as Mahadev Govind Ranade, Lokmanya Tilak, Gopal Krishna Gokhale) who made a name in 19th century Maharashtra after going to college in Pune and after that to England for higher studies in economics, and law, for example, Narayan Tilak never left India's shores for his entire life. His mind was not formed by studies of Western thinkers in academic circles that were shaped by western education in British India, but he read widely and thought deeply on matters of moment for his people in a colonial situation.

Tilak undertook a variety of modest jobs in different towns in Maharashtra at different times in his life, including the job of a teacher, a Hindu priest, and a printing press compositor. He was not stable in holding on to a job too long because his temperament as a seeker impelled him to search for guidance and role models in gurus (spiritual teachers), of whom there were at least three. As a poet and improvisatore, and would earn more than pocket change for publishing poetry.

In 1891, he got a job in Nagpur as a translator of Sanskrit literature, both philosophical and religious. (He himself wrote and published poems in Marathi and Sanskrit from his years in Nashik and won many prizes in Maharashtrian cities for elocution.) Under the patronage of Appasaheb Buti, he edited for a short while a Marathi magazine named Rushi (ऋषि), which was aimed at interpretation and discussion of Hindu religious matters. Tilak was proud of his Hindu heritage and leaned strongly toward Hindu social and religious reform as a sudharak (reformer). He never went to college, but taught himself English by memorizing much of an English dictionary.

== Early influences ==
Narayan (aka Nana) Tilak was a seeker. As a child, he was strongly influenced by the religiosity of his mother Jankibai and his maternal grandfather who sang to little Narayan the songs of the Saint-poets of Maharashtra such as Dnyaneshvar, Namdev, Eknath, Tukaram, and Ramdas. So much have the poetry and devotional practices of Narayan Tilak, both in his Hindu and Christian years, been influenced especially by the saint-poets especially of the Varkari Sampraday, that Tilak has sometimes been deemed the "last of the saint-poets of Maharashtra." He has also been called the "Tukaram of Maharashtra."

The earliest influences on Nana's great love and gifts for poetry and spirituality were his beautiful natural surroundings in the Konkan region of his infancy and childhood, and the spiritual and poetic gifts of his mother whom he loved dearly. Nana did not benefit from his father Vaman's love and attention. Vaman, in fact, generally hated and abused the lad and showed his disdain openly. Nana twice ran away from home, the latter time being immediately after Janki was mortally wounded by a kick from her husband to whom she had always been devoted. Nana was witness to his father's cruel act. After a few days of attending to his mother, he watched her die. Then he waited for her cremation rites at the sacred pilgrimage center of Tryambakeshwar, after which Nana left his father and his family for good. He walked the twelve miles from Tryambak to Nashik. He was sitting on the banks of the Godavari contemplating his next move, when a local boy befriended him and brought him to his mother Yesubai Mayle. Without a fuss, the good woman welcomed her son's newfound homeless friend into her home and arranged for his food with local brahmin families as he went to study at Bhatjicha Math. His budding talent for poetry and elocution soon earned him fame in his mid-teens as well as the nickname "Maharashtra-kokil" (the sweet singing cuckoo of Maharashtra).

== Spiritual search ==
Tilak was married at the age of 18 to Manakaranika Gokhale (मनकर्णिका गोखले). After the marriage Manakarnika was given the name Lakshmibai Tilak. Not long after the marriage, he left his very young wife with her in-laws and went on his quest for answers to deep questions. Later, in his twenties, he left Laxmi in the care of his father and took off in part for employment, and in part on same persistent spiritual quest. He actually tried a couple times to take sannyasa as a renunciate, but was rejected when his gurus found out that he was married and sent back to care for his family. He also went on a padayatra (pilgrimage on foot) to northern India as far as Delhi and western India as far as Dwarka. His goal may have seemed religious, but in fact he undertook this purposeful wandering principally out of a spirit of deshseva, namely, to serve his countrymen and especially women whose conditions struck him as oppressive and greatly in need of amelioration educationally, religiously, culturally, and socially. He made his own inquiries into Buddhism and Islam. Eventually, under the powerful influence of the Hindu monotheistic associations of the past several decades, particularly of the Prarthana Samaj and the Arya Samaj, he formulated five principles on which to found a new religion that was geared to emancipate his people. What pained him most seems to have been two urgent issues.

Probably because Narayan saw the intolerable situation of his own beloved mother, who was killed by his overbearing and heartless father, as well as that of Narayan's older sister Sakhu who had been married off by his orthodox Hindu father as a mere child, the first burning issue for Tilak was that of women's distress and suffering under an ironclad and religiously sanctioned patriarchy. Hindu women severely lacked opportunities for their education and emancipation. They suffered due to inhumane practices relating to child marriage. Some consequences of such practices were "child widows", and marriages of poor and sometimes pre-pubescent young girls to rich widowed men, some of them in their dotage. (See Uma Chakravarti, "Rewriting History: The Life and Times of Pandita Ramabai" 1998). The second issue that needed to be addressed was casteism, a plague on Indian society, especially in Maharashtra. Tilak came from a relatively poor family, but from privileged stock. Indeed, Chitpavan brahmin males such as himself, were the blue eyed boys of Maharashtrian society. He saw the desperate and widespread situation in which there was no way out for those born into so-called "lower castes" and who structurally served at the whim and fancy of caste-Hindu society, especially brahmins (aka bhatjis) and banias (landed and moneyed trader caste which was known to have generally profited from unprincipled moneylending).

Tilak, like other reform minded elite Hindus, was certainly aware of the writings and practices of Jotiba Phule, perhaps the most radical Hindu reformer of 19th century Maharashtra. He had done pioneering work for the emancipation and amelioration of the conditions of women and shudras in Pune and elsewhere in Maharashtra. Phule, a non-brahmin of the Mali caste had been educated by Scottish missionaries, but never converted to Christianity. Tilak, on the other hand, as a brahmin traumatized by his father's abusive treatment of his mother and himself, and as one who had delved deep into the treasure troves of Hindu religion, as well as of Marathi and Sanskrit literatures, seems to have been more moderate and liberal in his outlook, and considered religious and social reform as a promising way to emancipate women and "shudras" in Maharashtra. But nobody anticipated that the talented Pandit Narayan Vaman Tilak, Hindu patriot and sudharak in his own right, might unthinkably take the dread step of conversion to Christianity. The underlying assumption of most Hindu elites at that time was that sociological religious conversion was tantamount to treachery toward Hindu religion and society. Such treachery had severe sanctions, for example, ostracism or even death. Even worse, once a caste Hindu sociologically converted to another faith, it was all but impossible for him or her to be received back into caste. Tilak spurned all attempts of relatives, friends, and would-be benefactors to bribe him with money and a regular salary for life, for example.

== Conversion to Christianity ==
In 1893, Tilak was travelling by train from Nagpur to Rajnandgaon, a princely state ruled by a Hindu priest, and located within the then Central Provinces of India, in search of employment. During this journey, he met a Protestant missionary Ernest Ward of the Free Methodist Church who spoke glowingly of Christianity, presented a copy of the Bible to Tilak, and suggested that Tilak would become a Christian within two years. Tilak began to study the Bible and was strongly influenced by the Sermon on the Mount. He also read Arunodaya (Sunrise) by Baba Padmanji, six times.

Tilak's journey to Christianity was painful as he understood the reactions that would follow conversion. He anonymously corresponded with a missionary magazine and after confirmation through a series of dreams decided to be baptized. After four months of instruction by his spiritual father Rev. Justin E. Abbott, his baptism in Mumbai on 10 February 1895 was carried out by an untouchable, at Tilak’s request. Tilak deliberately chose a former untouchable Rev. Tukaram Nathoji, then Marathi editor of the Dnyanodaya to do the honors. This was a symbolic choice. Tilak was going to follow his divine teacher's example in self-emptying. He was not accepting Christianity as a gesture of a colonized subject. Not for him a foreigner as the officiant nor a symbol of privileged caste-Hindu patriarchy, but an accomplished writer and editor of formerly untouchable stock - the last would be first.

== New Life as a Christian ==
Tilak's baptism proved to be a sensational event and multitudes of his Hindu followers were scandalized. He was already highly respected as a poet, teacher, published writer, fervent and enlightened Hindu patriot and social reformer, and a dynamic spiritual leader. He was very sympathetic to the Prarthana Samaj, a monotheistic association dedicated to modernizing Hindu religion and society by jettisoning what seemed to be untenable intertwined Hindu concepts and doctrines such as karma (deeds) and punarjanma (rebirths). Knowing that he was contemplating Christian conversion, his relatives, friends, and admirers tried their level best to persuade him to change his mind. But he deeply disappointed them all. As payback, two attempts were made on the recent convert's life, but he miraculously escaped.

Tilak tried to get Laxmi to join him and waited for many long months for her to pluck up courage and join him. She seemed to agree with him intellectually and spiritually, but balked at the last moment. After going through various phases of keeping her distance from her reunited husband and his "untouchable" people, she finally opted to be baptized along with her son in 1900 at Rahuri.

== Christian work ==
Talik taught for a year at Hume High School in Byculla, but, unable to cope with the principal of Hume High School, Rev. Edward Sackett Hume's strict western-style discipline, he moved to Ahmednagar, a major center of the American Marathi Mission, at the invitation of Rev. Robert Allen Hume, who was dean of the Theological Seminary. There Tilak reinvented himself and also began to reinterpret the colonial Mission itself.

Tilak began teaching in the seminary in Ahmadnagar and was ordained as a minister in the Congregational church on 10 February 1904 at Rahuri. Besides doing rural pastoral work, Tilak played a key role in the transformation of its prime Christian beneficiaries, who were primarily the rural poor and former Untouchables of the Mahar and Mang castes.

He became editor of (and frequent contributor to) the Marathi section of the missionary magazine Dnyanodaya in 1912, a position he held until his death.

After about ten years as a Christian he began expressing his faith in local idioms, particularly the poetic style of the Varkari Hindu sampradaya of Maharashtra. The many songs he composed remain very popular among Marathi speaking Christians. He composed kirtans (musical religious services with a mixture of poetry and dramatic retelling of Hindu stories of religious inspiration, along with humor and vigorous community participation) and was so popular, he even trained others to professionally conduct kirtans. This continued into his Christian years when he led kirtans, trained Christian kirtankars, including his wife Laxmi, and published a little handbook Kirtan Kalap as a guide.

However, Tilak was a critic of traditional Christianity, and for the last two years of his life moved beyond the church to focus on developing a new brotherhood (that he called an ashram) of baptized and unbaptized disciples of Jesus. This new approach never took root due to Tilak's early death in Mumbai on 9 May 1919.

== Tilak and Lakshmibai’s writings ==
From 1895 for nearly fifteen years, Tilak published innumerable poems and articles for children on topics suited to a child's mind in the Balbodhmeva, an entertaining educational monthly run by the American Marathi Mission dedicated to children. He wrote voluminously in prose and verse and, due to the Romantic stamp of his secular poetry, was deemed the "Christian Wordsworth of Maharashtra." Owing to the very many hundred of devotional hymns which Rev. Tilak composed for church worship and for singing in villages, others saw him as the "Tagore of Western India." (See Nazareth, "Rev. Narayan Vaman Tilak: An Interreligious Exploration," 1998, chapter 3 and Appendix).

Tilak composed over a hundred Christian devotional songs in Marathi in either abhanga (अभंग) or ovi (ओवी) form. They were published in a book titled "Abhanganjali" (अभंगांजली). He also commenced in 1909 composition of epical Khristayan (ख्रिस्तायन). He composed 10 chapters of it and left it uncompleted at the time of his death; Laxmibai subsequently completed it by adding 64 chapters of her own.

Lakshmibai had no formal schooling; however, through Tilak's encouragement, she learned to read and write Marathi, mastering the language to the extent of later composing poems. After her husband's death, she wrote her autobiography, Smruti Chitre (स्मृतिचित्रे) (“Sketches of Memory”) where she told of the highs and lows of living with Talik; it was published in four parts across 1934 and 1935. Laxmi described how he would disappear at night to watch and participate in Dashavatari plays in the neighboring village of Gangapur and return in the wee hours of the morning. His talent for acting in diverse roles did not fail to catch the attention of the villagers. Rumors of his acting and singing and compositions reached his brother-in-law who went and ascertained for himself the truth. Indeed, Narayan was a gifted actor and poet. (See Smruti Chitre, Part 1)

== Death ==
Tilak died on 9 May 1919 at the J.J. Hospital, Byculla in Mumbai.

== Family ==
Tilak’s father was a government registrar and his mother died when he was 11.

Tilak was married to Manubai Lakshmibai when he was 18 and she was 11; they lived apart until they were 28 and 21 respectively and they went on to have four children.

Tilak's son, Devdatt Narayan Tilak, edited and published the epic poem Christayana. Tilak's grandson, Ashok Devdatt Tilak, was an accomplished historian who edited a critical edition of Smruti Chitre (स्मृतिचित्रे) and wrote a biographical novel about Tilak (चालता बोलता चमत्कार, Chalta Bolta Chamatkar) among other works.

== Publications ==
Besides the initial parts of Khristayan (ख्रिस्तायन), Tilak wrote many long poems comprising several hundred lines, each. He wrote over 2100 poems.

His poetry includes:

- Khristayan (ख्रिस्तायन)
- Wanawasi Phool (वनवासी फुल)
- Sushila (सुशीला)
- Majhi Bharya (माझी भार्या)
- Bapache Ashru (बापाचे अश्रू)
- Parwatarohan (पर्वतारोहण)
- Srushtichi Bhaubij (सृष्टीची भाऊबीज)
- Pure Janato Micha Majhe Bala (पुरे जाणतो मीच माझे बळ)
- Ranashing (रणशिंग)
- Majhya Janambhumiche Nav (माझ्या जन्मभूमीचे नाव)
- Priyakar Hindistan (प्रियकर हिंदीस्तान)
- Lekarachi Jidnyasa (लेकराची जिज्ञासा)
- Kawichi Winawani (कवीची विनवणी)
- Kawi (कवि)
- Kevdhe He Krourya (केव्हडे हे क्रौर्य)

== Bibliography ==
=== Primary Sources ===
- Tilak, Narayan Vaman. "Maza Anubhav." (Steps to Christ). Dnyanodaya 54/11 (Mar. 1895) 2 pp.
- Tilak, Narayan Vaman. "Stree" (Woman). Dnyanodaya 54/13 (Mar. 1895) 2 pp.
- Tilak, Narayan Vaman. "A Brahman's Idea of Sin." Dnyanodaya 59/23 (Jun. 1900) 1.
- Tilak, Narayan Vaman. "Hindus as Givers." Dnyanodaya 59/29 (Jul. 1900) 1.
- Tilak, Narayan Vaman. "A Few Thoughts on the Lord's Prayer." Dnyanodaya 66/37, 38, 41, 42, 43, 49 (Sep. Nov. 1907) 6.
- Tilak, Narayan Vaman. "The Study of Indian Myths." 71/37 (Sep. 1912) 1.
- Tilak, Narayan Vaman. Bhakti-Niranjana. Nasik, n.d. 160 pp.
- Tilak, Narayan Vaman. (Translations of his poems into English, including parts of the Khristayana.)
- Tilak, Narayan Vaman. "India's Great Demand." YMI (Jan. 1909) 10.
- Tilak, Narayan Vaman. "My Motherland." YMI (Sep. 1917) 513.
- Tilak, Narayan Vaman. "No Longer I But Christ." YMI (Apr. 1926) 219.
- Tilak, Narayan Vaman. Susila and Other Poems. Calcutta: YMCA, 1926. 60 pp.
- Tilak, Narayan Vaman. (Poems in English translation by J.C. Winslow.)
- Tilak, Narayan Vaman. Christayan. Tr. into English by J.C. Winslow. CSS Review.
- Tilak, Narayan Vaman. Translations in J.C. Winslow, Narayan Vaman Tilak. Calcutta: YMCA, 1923. 137 pp.
- Tilak, Narayan Vaman. Loka Bandhu Prabhu Yeshu Khrist. (Jesus the People's Friend, I). [Prose.] Bombay: Bombay Tract Society, 1921. 38 pp.
- Tilak, Narayan Vaman, and Tilak, Laksmibai. Khristayana. Nashik: Devadatt Narayan Tilak, 'Shantisadan,' 1938.
- Tilak, Narayan Vaman and Laksmibai Tilak. Khristayana. Sanskipta. [= Abridged] Mumbai: Bombay Tract and Book Society, 1959.

=== Secondary Sources ===
- J. C. Winslow, Naryana Vamana Tilak. Calcutta: Association Press, 1923.
- Nazareth, Malcolm J., Reverend Narayan Vaman Tilak: An interreligious exploration. Temple University, 1998.
- Patil, Subash, Santa Tukaram ani Rev. Tilak: Ek Bhāvanubandha. Pune: Snehavardhana Publ. House, 2005.
- Richard, H.L., Christ-bhakti: Narayan Vaman Tilak and Christian Work among Hindus. Delhi: ISPCK, 1991.
- Richard, H.L., Following Jesus in the Hindu Context. Revised and expanded. Secunderabad, India: OM Book, 1998.
- Richard, H.L., Following Jesus in the Hindu Context: The intriguing implications of N.V. Tilak’s life and thought. Revised American edition. Pasadena: William Carey Library, 1998.
- Sheikh, Mir Isahak, Laksmibai Tilakanchi Smrtichitre: Ek Chintan. Pune: Pratima Prakashan, 2000.
- Tilak, Ashok D., Chalta Bolta Chamatkar. Mumbai: Popular Prakashan, 2005.
- Tilak, Ashok D., Chavaituhi. Nashik: Mukta Ashok Tilak, Shantisadan, 2001.
- Tilak, Ashok D., Sampurna Smruti Chitre. Mumbai: Popular Prakashan, 1989.
- Tilak, Ashok D., Jara Vegala Angle. Nashik: Mayavati Ashok Tilak, 1979.
- Tilak, Ashok D., Takkarmāl. Nashik Road: Vangmayaseva Prakashan, 2006.
- George, Anthony D., Svatantryapurvakalatila Dharmantarita Khristi Vyaktinci Atmanivedane Samajika Ani Vangmayina Abhyasa. Mumbai: Mumbai Vidyapeeth, 2007. [PhD thesis on pre-1947 Marathi converts to Christianity, submitted to Bombay University.]
