= Saloli =

Village in Maharashtra

- village
- Interactive map of Saloli
- Country: India
- State: Maharashtra
- District: Thane district

Languages
  - Official: Marathi
- Time zone: UTC+5:30 (IST)
- PIN: 401201
- Telephone code: 0250
- Vehicle registration: MH-48

The Saloli (meaning: Squirrel) is an area of the town of Vasai (Bassein), part of Palghar district of the state of Maharashtra, India comprises the following villages:

== Villages ==
- Small Giriz
- Madibhat
- Billbhat
- Atodiwadi
- Devalbhat
- Prathambahat
- Dolbhat
- Pholodi
- Kaular Wadi
- Tiwarbhat
- Kharbhat
- Sutarbhat
- Dhupalwadi
- Silshiwadi
- Javghar
- Naglai
- Talai
- Agardam
- Vaitodi
- Bhoronde
- Kerlai
- Nalai
- Levdi
- Gunbhat
- Patlar
- Dhupalwadi
- Chavriwadi
