= Miri, Ahmednagar =

Miri-Maka
- village
- Location in Maharashtra, India
- Coordinates: 19.28°N 74.84°E
- Country: India
- State: Maharashtra
- District: Ahmadnagar
- Established: 1000 years ago

Population
  - Total: 15,000

Languages
  - Official: Marathi
- Time zone: UTC+5:30 (IST)
- Postal code: 414501

Miri one of the important villages situated in Pathardi taluka, Ahmednagar District, Maharashtra on the Paithan road. And twenty miles to the south of Nevasa Miri is also known as Miri Maka because it has Maka village very close to it.

Miri was at the time of publication of the old Ahmednagar District Gazetteer an alienated village. It has a post office. A weekly market is held at Miri on every Saturday.

== History ==
Miri is famous for its old civilization which is more than 1000 years old. From mediaeval period of history we get the history of this town. The town reached the height of its prosperity at the end of the 19th century and was well known for its religious and educational importance. Many natives and non-natives from Ahmednagar were sending their children for High school study in Miri.

Some famous surnames in Miri are Mirpagar, Gawali, Solat, Zade, Gund, Korde, Mirikar, Meher, Gale, Narwade etc.

== Religions shrines ==
Miri is famous for its religious places like temples, churches and also schools providing knowledge and educational experiences to the young generation. Thousands of devotees come for their religious support and also to worship their own 'Makers'(Gods) every year from all over India. Many native people who were migrated to other places also gather on the get-together on many occasions. Many villagers had left the village due to drought in 1960. Most villagers migrated to Mumbai, Pune, Nasik and settled there. Migrated villagers from Miri are highly educated.

The Shrine of the Hindu-Muslims saint Kanhoba is well build in the area. The shrine is said to have been built in 1644 A.D. Fairs and Feast are held in the town. The one is honour of Virabhadra held in September–October. The other is held in honour of Kanhoba on 10 March. (On Falgun Rangpanchami which comes in March Month)

== Religion ==
Church in Miri-Maka

Hindus are majority in Miri. about 85% of locals are Hindus and Christians are second highest Majority in Area which is about 15%. The Town has been maintained a communal Harmony in area. Hindu and Christians Participates in each other's festival and ceremonies.

== See also ==
- Education in Miri-Maka
