= Baba Padmanji =

Indian Marathi writer and Christian preacher (1831–1906)

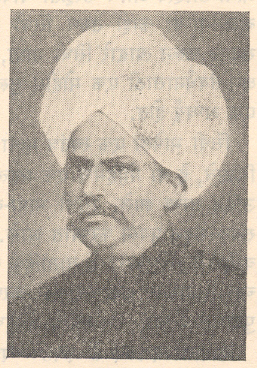
- Born: Baba Padmanji Mule; 1831; Belgaum
- Died: 29 August 1906 (aged 74–75); Bombay
- Occupation: Writer
- Writing career
- Language: Marathi
- Genres: Novel, Poetry, Prose
- Subject: Christianity

Baba Padmanji Mule, better known as Baba Padmanji (1831 - 29 August 1906) was an Indian writer, novelist, religious preacher and Protestant Christian reformer in the 19th-century Bombay Presidency, who is known for contributing to Marathi literature. He is known for converting to Christianity from Hinduism in his early twenties and is considered the father of Christian literature in Marathi language. He has published over a hundred books. His novel Yamuna Paryatan is the first independent social novel in Marathi.

== Life and work ==
He was born in May 1831 in Belgaum (now in Karnataka) to a Konkani-Marathi family. He attended a Christian missionary school in his hometown, where he developed his interest in Christianity. He went to complete his education at the Bombay Scottish Mission's Wilson School in 1849. Later, Baba worked as a teacher at the Free Church High School in Bombay, where he taught catechism and other Christianity related subjects.

He was mentored by Murray Mitchell, John Wilson and Narayan Sheshadri. He was ordained Pastor at the Free Church in 1867, serving the Free Church of Pune till 1872.

He also owned a printing press called Victoria Press in Bombay. He headed various Christian journals and magazines and authored more than 100 Marathi texts on Christian themes. In 1877, he rose to prominence for producing the first Bible (New Testament) translation with commentary made by native Christians.

He died on 29 August 1906 and was buried at the Christian cemetery at Sewri, in Bombay.

== Bibliography ==
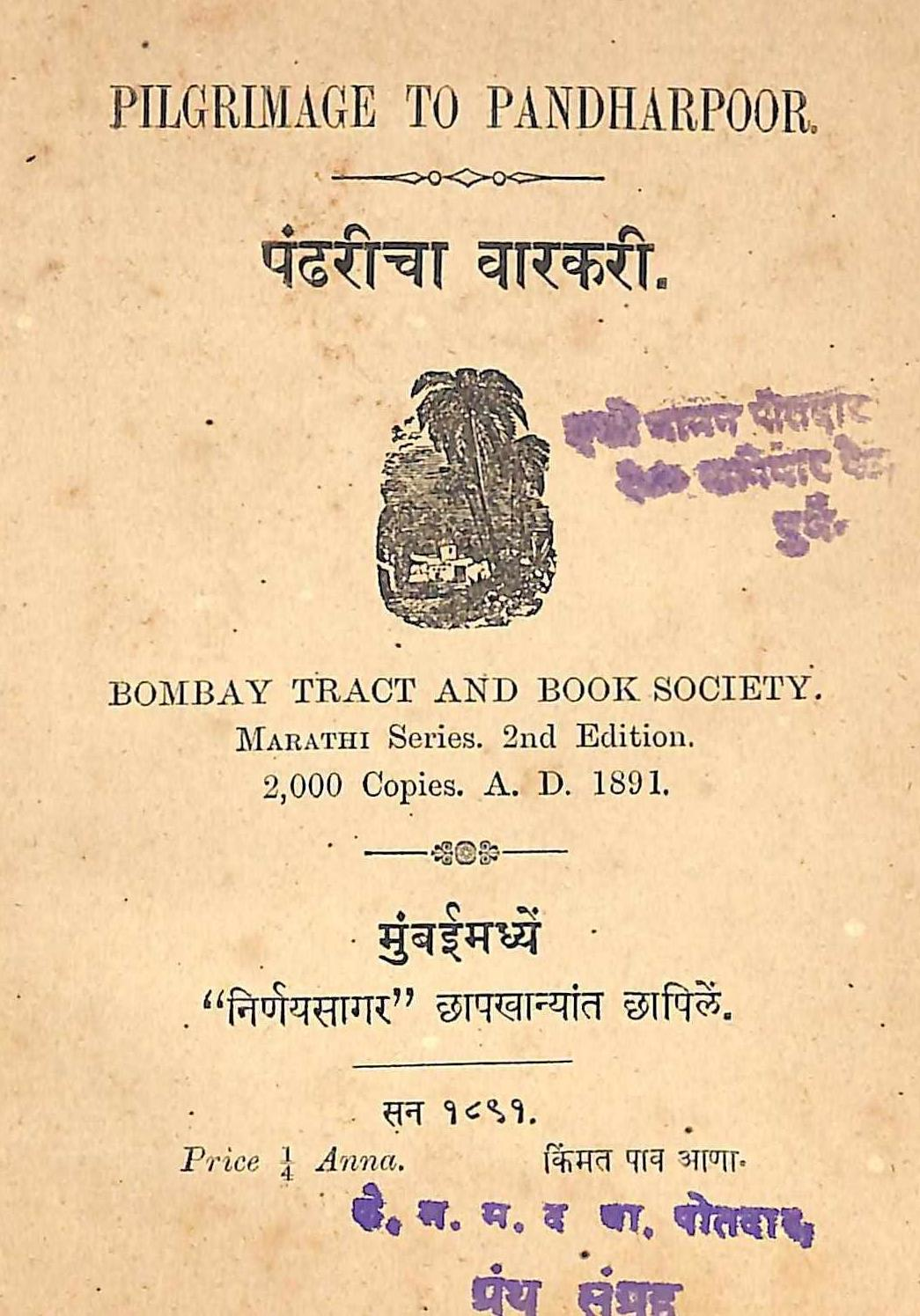
A book cover of Pandharicha Varkari, 1891, authored by Baba Padmanji

Some of his notable works include Streevidyabhyas Nibandh (1852), Vyabhichaar-Nishedhak Bodh (1854), Yamunaparyatan (1857), Sarvasangrahi urf Nibandhmala (1860), Shabdaratnavali (1860), Maharashtradeshachya Sankshipt Itihaas (1866), Streekanthabhushan (1868), A Comprehensive Dictionary of English and Marathi (second ed. 1870), Krushna Aani Khrista Yanchi Tulana (1873), Navya Kararavar Tika (1877) and Udgarmargvidnyan (1878).

He authored an autobiography titled Arunodaya (Ascent of the Sun), published in 1888. Arunodaya was translated into many languages. Some scholars consider his book Yamunaparyatan (1857) to be the first independent novel published in Marathi.
