= Coca-Cola India =

Indian subsidiary of The Coca-Cola Company

- Type: Subsidiary
- Industry: Consumer goods
- Founded: Original: 1950; 76 years ago Relaunch: 1993; 33 years ago
- Headquarters: Gurugram, Haryana, India
- Area served: India
- Key people: Sanket Ray (president, India and Southwest Asia)
- Products: Beverages
- Number of employees: 25,000 (direct)
- Parent: The Coca-Cola Company
- Website: https://www.coca-cola.com/in/en

Coca-Cola India is a subsidiary of The Coca-Cola Company and operates in India. Sanket Ray, who joined The Coca-Cola Company in 2004, was appointed president of its India and Southwest Asia business in 2020.

== Background ==
The Coca-Cola Company started operating in India in 1950. It withdrew from the country in 1977 amid a dispute over requirements to reduce foreign equity ownership and disclose its formula. It returned to the Indian market on 24 October 1993.

In July 2025, Jubilant Bhartia Group completed its acquisition of a 40% stake in Hindustan Coca-Cola Holdings, the parent company of Hindustan Coca-Cola Beverages. The deal was announced in December 2024, with Mint reporting an estimated value of ₹12,000–12,500 crore.

== Products ==
As of 2024, the company manufactures and sells the following products in India:

- Coca-Cola and its variants
- Sprite
- Thums Up
- Kinley
- Limca
- Fanta
- Maaza
- Schweppes
- Charged
- Minute Maid
- Smartwater
- Rim Zim
- Costa Coffee
- Georgia
- Honest Tea

== Social initiatives ==
The Coca-Cola Company launched its global 5by20 initiative in 2010 with the stated goal of supporting five million women entrepreneurs in its value chain by 2020.

In January 2011, Coca-Cola India and NDTV, in association with UN-Habitat, the Charities Aid Foundation and other partners, launched the Support My School campaign. It aimed to improve school infrastructure in rural and semi-urban areas, particularly access to water and sanitation.

== Controversy ==
=== Centre for Science and Environment ===
Coca-Cola reported an 11% decline in its Indian sales volume in the third quarter of 2003, which it attributed to pesticide allegations by the Delhi-based Centre for Science and Environment (CSE). The company denied the allegations. CSE had tested 12 soft drink brands of PepsiCo and Coca-Cola and reported pesticide residues above the European Economic Community's drinking-water limits.

=== Plachimada plant ===
Coca-Cola set up a factory in the tribal village of Plachimada in Kerala in 1999. The factory extracted huge quantities of groundwater for its production. The groundwater level receded and was found to be contaminated by the factory's operations, giving rise to health issues among the residents of the village. The company sold the slurry and sludge waste as fertilizer to locals, primarily engaged in farming, which was later found to contain dangerous levels of toxic metals in a study conducted by the University of Exeter. Coca-Cola India executives, however, claimed that the fertilizer was "good for crops", and they had scientific evidence proving its safety. Eventually, locals mobilized under the banner 'Coca-Cola Virudha Janakeeya Samara Samithy' (Anti Coca-Cola Peoples Struggle Committee) and demanded that the factory be closed and farmers be compensated. The company initiated legal action against the protestors, which resulted in intimidation, arrests and false cases being filed against the protestors. They received support from neighbouring villages, environmentalists, politicians, scientists, and several civil society organizations. The plant was forced to stop production in March 2004. The cause of the farmers became international with a BBC investigatory report and later in 2007 when college students in the United States ran a nationwide campaign calling for a boycott of Coca-Cola. After a prolonged legal battle in Kerala High Court and then the Supreme Court, Coca-Cola relinquished its licence in July 2017 and stated that it would not resume production in the plant.

== See also ==
- Coca-Cola slogans in India
