= RimZim =

Brand of masala soda

RimZim is a brand of masala (mixed spice) soda currently owned and marketed by Coca-Cola in India. The brand was originally part of Parle Bisleri since its launch in the 1980s and was sold to Coca-Cola along with Thums Up, Limca, Citra and Gold Spot to Coca-Cola in 1993. Apart from Thums Up and Limca, the rest of the Parle brands were withdrawn from the market by its new owners. In 2012, Coca-Cola announced that it was reviving RimZim for the North India market where it had a strong base when withdrawn.
