= Rasna (drink) =

Indian soft drink concentrate

Rasna Private Limited
- Type: Drink mix
- Manufacturer: Pioma Industries Limited
- Distributor: Rasna International
- Origin: India, Asia
- Introduced: 1976; 48 years ago
- Flavor: Mango; Oranage; Litchi; Guava
- Variants: Rasna Ready to mix drink; Rasna Honey; Rasna Peanut Butter; Rasna Soft Drink; Rasna Health Drink; Rasna Chyawanprash
- Website: https://rasnainternational.com/

Rasna is an Indian brand of soft drink concentrate owned by Pioma Industries, headquartered in Ahmedabad, India. It was introduced in the mid-1970s and gained significant popularity during the 1980s, a period when the Indian soft drink market was dominated by carbonated beverages such as Thums Up, Gold Spot, and Limca.

As of 2009, Rasna held a 93% market share in the soft drink concentrate segment in India. By 2011, the company reported a turnover of ₹3.5 billion (US$37 million).

In addition to its widespread consumption as a children's drink, Rasna has diversified into experiential retail with the launch of over 40 non-alcoholic beverage bars across India under the brand name Rasna Buzz. These outlets cater to younger demographics and offer a range of drinks including soda-based beverages, milkshakes, sundaes, and themed mocktails such as Mirchi Mango, Masala Orange, Minty Jeera Lemonade, and Kala Khatta Buzz. The menu also features Indian snacks like idli, batata vada, as well as Western fast food items including burgers, pasta, momos, and French fries. The first Rasna Buzz outlet opened in Pune in 2019.

== Facilities and products ==
Though the company does most of its business in India where it has five manufacturing facilities in Gujarat and one in Himachal Pradesh, it has manufacturing facilities outside India in Bangladesh, Dubai, Saudi Arabia and Egypt. The company manufactures soft drink concentrate in 11 different flavours. In India, Rasna earns most of its profits from the soft drink concentrate market though it makes fruit jams, fruit cordials, teas, pickles, chutneys, ready-to-eat curries, and snacks, majority of which are exported.

In 2000, Rasna launched an aerated fruit drink, Oranjolt. The venture failed, which was attributed to the fact that the drink needed to be refrigerated at all times and many retailers in India switch off their refrigerators at night. The company launched juice products in the market in 2002 and in 2010, it announced that it was entering the health drinks segment.

== Advertising ==
The company has used national television as a mode of advertising its products since the 1980s. Its tagline "I love you Rasna" is aimed at children. In the original ad campaign, the Rasna girl was played by Ankita Jhaveri, now an actress in South India while the latest one, Avan Khambatta is from the Khambatta family which owns the company. Rasna's distribution was initially taken up by Voltas and after two years of handling, Khambhatta decided to withdraw and approached Rallis and Corn products (now known as Bestfoods and owned by Unilever). However, since that did not materialise, Pioma Industries set up its own distribution infrastructure. Their brand advertising was managed by Mudra Communications between 1984 and 2005, Dentsu between 2005 and 2009 and from 2009 onwards by Rediffusion. In the past, Karisma Kapoor, Hrithik Roshan, Anupam Kher, Paresh Rawal, Kapil Dev, Virender Sehwag and Genelia D'Souza have been Rasna's brand ambassadors. Currently, Rasna's brand ambassador is Akshay Kumar. As part as a promotional campaign featuring then Miss India, Pooja Chopra, Rasna made an attempt to break the Guinness World Record for the "world's biggest glass" in 2009.

== Competition and acquisitions ==
Kraft Foods, which markets soft drink concentrate under the Tang brand internationally, entered India in 2001 by setting up a manufacturing facility in Hyderabad. By 2003, tough competition from Rasna among other brands forced Kraft to shut its plant in India. At the time Rasna was said to be interested in purchasing the plant. However, the plant was not sold and restarted manufacturing Tang when it was taken over by Cadburys in 2010 as part of its global buyout by Kraft Foods. Rasna made another attempt at acquisition in 2003 itself, when it attempted to buy Brown & Polson and Rex Jelly brands from Hindustan Lever. According to Piruz Khambatta, chairman and managing director of Rasna, the deal offered was a licensing deal rather than an outright buyout, hence it fell through. India was the first market where Coca-Cola launched its soft drink concentrate brand, Sunfill. This brand too did not do well and was withdrawn in 2004, failing to break Rasna's monopoly in the segment. Like Tang, Sunfill too has been recently relaunched in India, in 2011.

In 2025, Rasna acquired the Jumpin ready-to-drink brand from Hershey's India as a part of its expansion beyond powdered concentration.
