= Bisleri (disambiguation) =

Bisleri may refer to:

- Bisleri, an Indian-based bottled water seller
- Felice Bisleri (1851-1921), an Italian businessman, inventor and chemist, namesake of the Indian company
- Franco Bordoni Bisleri (1913-1975), an Italian aviator and racing car driver
