= Parle Products =

Indian multinational food corporation

Parle Products Private Limited
- Trade name: PARLE
- Type: Private
- Industry: Food processing
- Founded: 1929; 97 years ago
- Founders: Chauhan family
- Headquarters: Vile Parle (East), Mumbai, Maharashtra, India
- Area served: Worldwide
- Key people: Vijay Chauhan; Sharad Chauhan; Raj Chauhan
- Products: Biscuits; confectionery
- Brands: Parle-G; 20-20 Cookies; Happy Happy; Hide & Seek; Krackjack; Magix Creme; Milano; Monaco; Melody
- Revenue: ▲₹17,223 crore (US$1.8 billion) (FY23)
- Net income: ▲₹905 crore (US$94 million) (FY23)
- Website: parleproducts.com

Parle Products is an Indian multinational food corporation which makes biscuits and confectionery products. Its Parle-G is the best-selling biscuit brand in the world, according to a 2011 Nielsen report.

== History ==
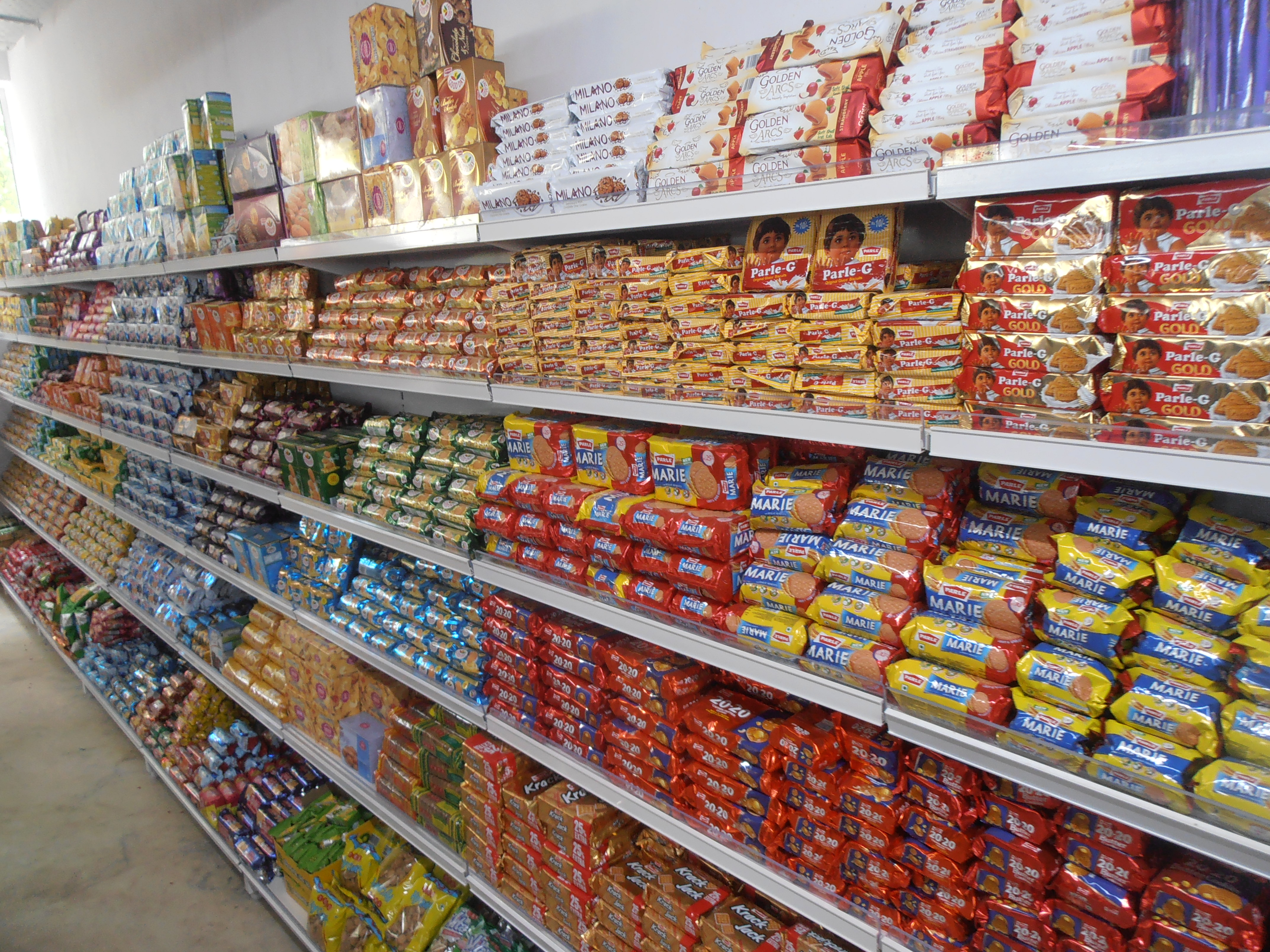
Parle biscuit products on the shelves of a supermarket

Parle Products was founded in 1929 in India by the Chauhan family of Vile Parle, Mumbai. The founder was Mohanlal Chauhan who hailed from Pardi near Valsad in Gujarat. He moved to Mumbai to make a living. At first, his profession was tailoring. However, it was not profitable, and so he moved into the food business by selling snacks. He ran a bakery making bread, buns, rusks, scones, nankhatai, and turnovers. He had five sons, Maneklal, Pitambar, Narottam, Kantilal and Jayantilal, who worked together under their father.

Parle began manufacturing biscuits in 1939, with a license to supply their biscuits only to the British Army. In 1947, when India became independent, the company launched an ad campaign showcasing its Glucose biscuits as an Indian alternative to the British biscuits. The Parle brand became well known in India following the success of products such as the Parle-G biscuits. Much later, in 1977, the Morarji Desai government expelled Coca-Cola from India. The family saw an opportunity here and opened their own cold drinks business, which flourished because there was no competition. It minted money from selling cold beverages like Gold Spot, Thums Up and Frooti, all of which became household names.

The original Parle company was split into three separate companies owned by the different factions of the original Chauhan family, with a majority of it owned by Parle Agro products. The separation was only that Jayantilal separated himself from his four older brothers. The reason was mainly because Jayantilal had a lifestyle different from his four older brothers. The four older brothers got the biscuits business as their share, and even to this day, they are all together with no further separation. Jayantilal took the beverages section as his share. This section was further divided between his two sons. The three companies today are as follows:

- Parle Products (1950s), led by Vijay, Sharad and Raj Chauhan (owner of brands such as Parle-G, 20-20, Magix, Milkshakti, Melody, Mango Bite, Poppins, Londonderry, Kismi Toffee Bar, Monaco and KrackJack)
- Parle Agro (1960s), led by Prakash Jayantilal Chauhan (elder son of Jayantilal Chauhan). The company is run by his daughters Schauna, Alisha and Nadia (owner of brands such as Frooti and Appy)
- Parle Bisleri (1970s), led by Ramesh Jayantilal Chauhan, younger son of Jayantilal. He runs it with his wife Zainab Chauhan and their daughter Jayanti Chauhan.

All three companies continue to use the family trademark name "Parle". The original Parle group was amicably segregated into three non-competing businesses. A dispute over the use of "Parle" brand arose when Parle Agro diversified into the confectionery business, thus becoming a competitor to Parle Products. In February 2008, Parle Products sued Parle Agro for using the brand Parle for competing confectionery products. Later, Parle Agro launched its confectionery products under a new design which did not include the Parle brand name. In 2009, the Bombay High Court ruled that Parle Agro can sell its confectionery brands under the brand name "Parle" or "Parle Confi" on condition that it clearly specifies that its products belong to a separate company which has no relationship with Parle Products.

== Infrastructure ==
Apart from the original factory in Mumbai, Parle has manufacturing facilities at Kanpur (Uttar Pradesh), Neemrana (Rajasthan), Bengaluru (Karnataka), Hyderabad (Telangana), Kutch (Gujarat), Khopoli (Maharashtra), Indore (Madhya Pradesh), Pantnagar (Uttarakhand), Sitarganj (Uttarakhand), Bahadurgarh (Haryana), and Muzaffarpur (Bihar). The plants at Bahadurgarh and Muzaffarpur are some of the largest manufacturing plants of Parle in India. It deploys large-scale automation for manufacturing of quality biscuits. It also has several manufacturing units on contract.

== In popular culture ==
During their bilateral meeting at Rome in May 2026, Indian Prime Minister Narendra Modi gifted a pack of Parle Melody (a candy by Parle Products) to his Italian counterpart Giorgia Meloni. The Italian prime minister posted a video on her social media thanking Modi for the gift. It immediately went viral online and sparked numerous memes, as this was considered a reference to her previous X post from the COP28 conference with the #Melodi (a portmanteau of Meloni and Modi). The candy was reportedly sold out from quick commerce websites within hours of the post. This also led to Parle Industries becoming a meme stock, as Parle Products is not listed on the stock market. The former company specializes in real estate, infrastructure building, waste management and recycling.
