= Feni (liquor) =

Alcoholic spirit produced in Goa, India

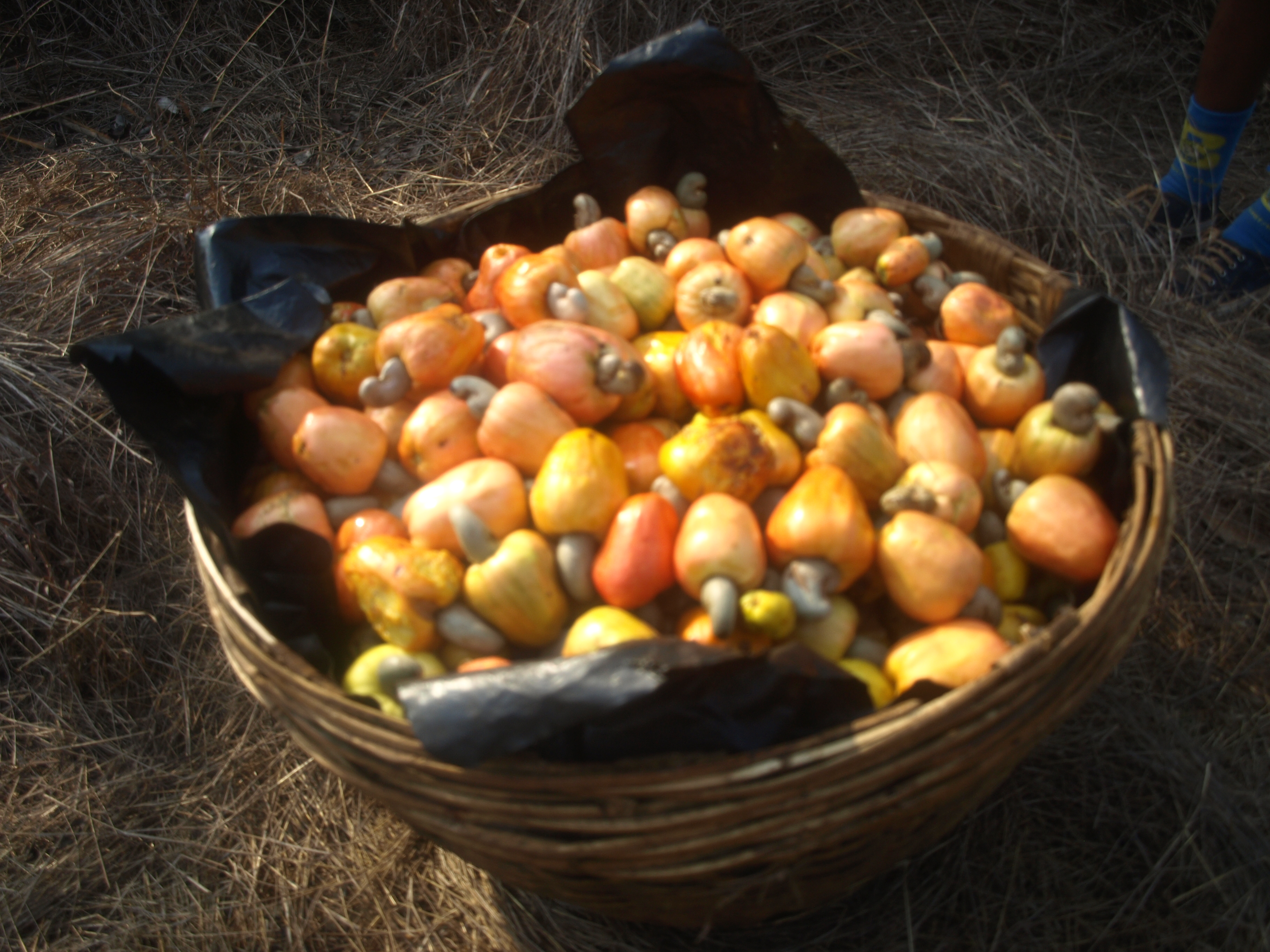
Cashew apples after plucking in Chorão, Goa.

Feni (Portuguese: fenim, often spelt as fenni or fenny) is a spiritous liquor type originating in Goa, India. The name "feni" comes from the Sanskrit word phena, meaning "froth" or "foam", referring to the foamy, bubbling appearance seen during distillation. The two most popular types of feni are cashew feni and coconut feni. Depending on the ingredients, however, other varieties and newer blends are also sold by distilleries. Small-batch distillation of feni strongly affects its final character, which still retains some of the delicate aromatics, congeners, and flavor elements of the juice from which it is produced.

The word "feni" is derived from the Sanskrit word फेन phena, in Konkani फेण fenn (froth); thought to come from the bubbles that form when the liquor is shaken inside a bottle or poured into a glass. It is generally accepted that coconut feni predates it, and feni followed the same process until Europeans introduced distillation. Coconut palms are abundant along the western coastline of the Konkan region of India, whereas the cashew tree is an exotic species of crop, imported by the Portuguese in Goa and Bombay, from what was colonial Brazil in South America. There is ambiguity about when and who first produced a fermented beverage of cashew fruits to make the distilled spirit of feni.

Feni consumed in South Goa generally has a higher alcohol content (43–45% ABV) than feni produced in North Goa. Commercially packaged feni is available at 42.8% ABV.

In August 2021, Goa notified the Goa Feni Policy, 2021, setting process and product specifications and establishing a Conformity Assessment Board (CAB) to verify compliance for both cashew feni and coconut feni. The policy sets specifications across the production chain, including harvesting and sourcing, extraction, fermentation, distillation, storage/maturation, bottling, labelling/selling, and related marketing and business practices.

== Preparation ==
=== Cashew feni ===
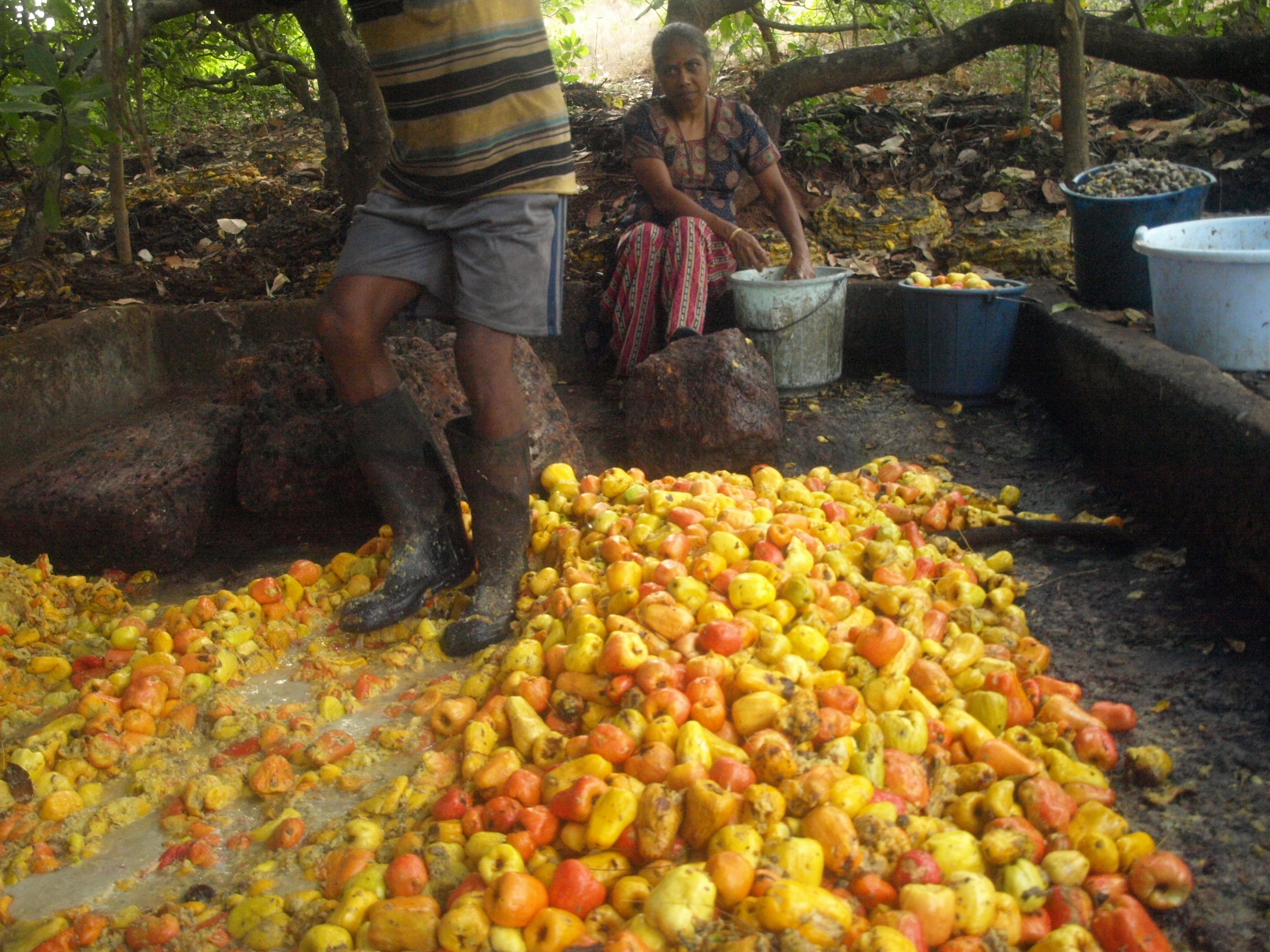
Cashew apples being squashed in Chorão, Goa

In the traditional method of making cashew feni, only tree-ripened cashew apples that have fallen are picked and taken for the crush. The cashew apples are de-seeded and then dropped into the stomping area. This area is called a collmi and is usually a rock cut into a basin shape. The cashew apples are stomped to release the juice. Stomping has now gradually been replaced by the use of a press called a pingre (cage). The pulp is then hand-patted into small mounds traditionally using a particular vine, nudi, which is snaked around it to hold it together while a heavy weight (typically a boulder) is placed on top. The juice produced through this second extraction process is known as neero/niro and is refreshing to drink; however, it is generally not used in the fermentation process for making feni. The first juice extract, obtained by stomping cashew apples, is traditionally transferred into a large earthen pot called a koddem, which is buried halfway in the ground and left to ferment for several days. Delicate earthen koddem have now been replaced by plastic drums for practicality. No additional yeast or nutrients are added to hasten the process.

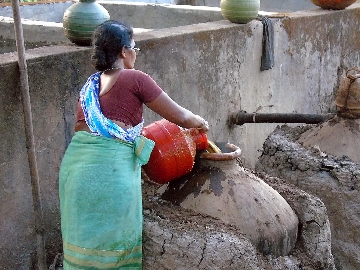
Fermented cashew fruit juice being transferred into pots for distillation.

Cashew feni is distilled employing the traditional pot. A traditional still for feni is known as a bhatti. The use of an earthen pot as the boiling pot has now been replaced with copper pots, both known by the same name, bhann. The distillate is collected in an earthen pot called a launni. The tradition of continuously pouring cold water on the launni to condense the distillate has been replaced by immersing a coil in cold water.

Cashew feni is a triple-distilled spirit. The Goa Feni Policy (2021) defines 'todap' as the first distillate of fermented cashew juice and defines urrac/urrack as the part distillate obtained during the first phase of cashew-feni distillation. The first distillate of the fermented neero is known as urrak, about 15% alcohol (30 proof). Urrak is then mixed with neero in a proportion determined by the distiller, and redistilled to give a spirit called cazulo or cajulo (40–42% ABV). Cazulo or cajulo is distilled again with Urrak to produce a high-strength spirit called feni (45% ABV). Note that cazulo is generally sold as "feni", as the spirit is considered too strong to be consumed. All cashew feni now available is double-distilled.

=== Coconut feni ===
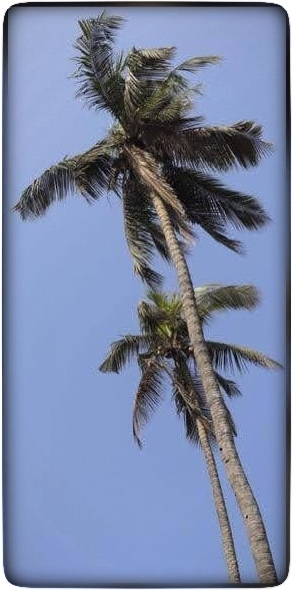
Fresh toddy (sur), fermented toddy (maddel), and toddy vinegar (vinagr) are obtained from coconut flower sap

Coconut feni, also known as maddel or maddachim fenni, is distilled from fermented toddy from the coconut palm. Traditionally toddy is collected from the coconut palm by a toddy-tapper called a Reindér. Toddy-tapping —the collection of juice from the bud or spadix of palm tree flowers— has been practiced in the Indian subcontinent and Southeast Asia for centuries. The sap of the coconut palm is collected in an earthen pot called a zamonnô or damonnem, which is fitted over the spadix (ipoi) that grows out of the base of each coconut leaf. In order to produce toddy, the spadix is tightly bound with a rope (gofê/gophe) made from filaments (vaiê) cut with a small knife (piskathi) from the base of the leaf, while remaining attached to the pedicel. The spadix must then be tapped gently around the circumference with the handle of the kathi (a flat, semi-circular sickle) every alternate day until it becomes round and flexible, a sign that the sap is ready. The tip of the spadix is then cut off to let the sap ooze out into the damonnem.

Toddy is collected from the damonnem in the morning and evening, and then carried down the tree in a gourd-shaped container called a dudhinnem before being poured into a clay pot called a kollsô. The spadix is sharpened at noon by slicing a small piece horizontally off the top, called cheu, so as to reactivate the flow of sap. For three days, the toddy used to be left to ferment in clay or porcelain pots, called monn or jhallo.

Coconut feni is largely produced and consumed only in South Goa. It is distilled employing the traditional pot. Coconut feni is prepared in a distillery known as a sôreachi bhatti. The earthen boiling pot has now been replaced with copper cauldrons, both known by the same name, bhann. The mouth of the bhann is sealed with a wooden stopper called a mhorannem. The vapors from the bhann pass through a tube called a nollo, made from a bonnki/bonnqui stem, and are collected in a clay distillation pot called a launni, which is placed in an open clay vessel called a koddem filled with water. The copper coil is immersed in cold water to condense the vapors.

Commercially bottled coconut feni has a concentration of 42.8% ABV. Coconut feni is a double-distilled spirit; the first distillate is called a mollop, about 15% alcohol (30 proof). Four kollxem (plural of kollsô) of toddy produce two pots of mollop. Four pots of mollop are then mixed with one kollso of toddy and distilled into a fiery coconut feni.

== Commerce ==
The feni selling market is largely unorganized. Locals tend to buy feni directly from the thousands of traditional distillers who run seasonal mini-distilleries or stalls in Goa's villages. Distillers sell a large volume of feni directly to taverns through business relationships that extend over generations.

Cashew feni is seasonal, distilled only from late February to mid-May. It depends heavily on the season's fruit harvest. The price of cashew feni also fluctuates with the harvest season.

Coconut feni is produced year-round, as coconut trees are tapped throughout the year. During the monsoon months, the coconut palms produce more toddy than in the drier months. Toddy tapping is very labor-intensive and is not an appealing profession. This has led to a dramatic decline in coconut feni production.

Feni has long been a favorite souvenir for tourists visiting the state. In the organized sector, hundreds of brands cater to the tourist market. Locals have slowly begun switching to standardized bottled feni in recent years. The past few years have witnessed the emergence of premium fenis, and discerning visitors increasingly rely on reviews to choose their brand.

Recent food-and-travel reporting has described a renewed interest in feni-based cocktails in Goa, including creative mixed drinks served at revived taverns and newer bars.

== Consumption ==
Feni can be served neat or over ice, mixed in classic cocktails, or with juices. It can be served with a slice of lime, and sometimes with sugar or sugar syrup, which are popular additions.

Popular mixers are cola, tonic water, and lemonade, with the latter probably the most popular. Feni is also often mixed with Limca, Maaza, Sprite, or 7 Up.

Feni has also culinary applications, such as in marinades for pork, along with garlic, ginger, Indian spices, and vinegar, as the base for the iconic vindaloo curry.

== Geographical indication ==
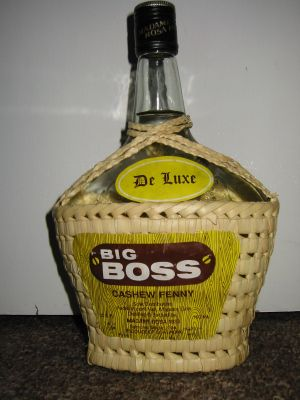
A bottle of Big Boss cashew feni

Cashew feni was awarded geographical indication registration in 2009 as a speciality alcoholic beverage from Goa, described as a colourless, clear liquid that when matured in wooden barrels develops a golden-brown tint. This designation was achieved through the efforts of the Goa Cashew Feni Distillers and Bottlers Association and the Department of Science, Technology and Environment of the Government of Goa. Academic and culinary-industry writing has described cashew feni as the first Indian alcoholic beverage/spirit to receive a GI tag. India's GI Registry also lists registered ‘authorised users’ for the Cashew Feni GI. The application of a G.I. for coconut feni has been neglected. In October 2024, Goa's Excise Department issued the first GI process certificate for distillation and bottling of cashew feni to Cazcar Distillery (Bicholim), following inspection by the Conformity Assessment Board (CAB). The distillery underwent an inspection led by officials from the Food and Drugs Administration (FDA), the Conformity Assessment Board as well as the Excise Department. Passing the inspection permits them to display the GI logo on their Feni products.

== Heritage drink ==
In 2016, Goa amended its excise law to define feni as a ‘heritage spirit’ (the Goa Excise Duty (Amendment) Act, 2016). Goa Chief Minister Laxmikant Parsekar described feni as "part of our culture". Plans include nature tourism, where tourists can see cashew harvesting and follow the drink's production process. Several distillers urged the government to issue rules on the distillation process and ensure that they are obeyed. Counterfeit feni and adulteration in quality were some of the issues raised by participants.

== Music reference ==
In 1966, feni became famous with the song "Goemchi Feni" sung by Alfred Rose: The Melody King of Goa as part of the Timeless Treasures album.

== Awards ==
Some feni companies have received international awards. At the 2025 London Spirits Competition, Sentari Barrel Aged Limited Edition Feni won the Gold medal (95 points), while Goenchi Cashew Feni and Goenchi Coconut Feni won Bronze medals. Coco Jumbo Coconut Liquer Feni received the Gold award (91 points) at the USA Spirits Ratings 2025.

Ozzo Feni became the first feni in India to receive a Geographical Indication (GI) tag.

== See also ==
- List of Indian drinks
- Bombay Sapphire
- Palm toddy
- Gin and tonic
