= Limca Book of Records =

Human and natural world records

- Editor: Anirban Sarkar
- Language: English
- Series: Limca Book of Records
- Subject: National records by Indians
- Genre: Indian National Record, Reference Book
- Published: 1987–present
- Publisher: Coca-Cola India (local division of Coca Cola Company)
- Publication date: Annually
- Publication place: India
- ISBN: 9788190114868
- Website: coca-colaindia.com

The Limca Book of Records is an annual reference book published in India documenting world records held by Indians. The records are further categorised into education, literature, agriculture, medical science, business, sports, nature, adventure, radio and cinema.

The Limca Book of Records is published in English and is a promotional tool of Limca, a soft drink brand, owned by the Coca Cola Company, it is a localised equivalent of the Guinness World Records.

== History ==
The Limca Book of Records was first published in 1990, when the Limca soft drink brand was owned by Parle Bisleri. It was started originally by Ramesh Chauhan, who sold it to The Coca-Cola Company in 1993. The book continued to be published by Coca-Cola. The Limca Book of Records is now published with the patronage of Coca-Cola India which manufactures Limca.

== Editions ==
Its year 2006 edition was launched in New Delhi by Atul Singh, CEO of Coca-Cola India.

On 25 September 2007, a special edition was released by Coca-Cola to commemorate 60 years of India's independence.

The 20th edition of this book was released by Amitabh Bachchan in March 2009. Indian Space Research Organisation (ISRO) chief G. Madhavan Nair also participated in this event.

The 21st text edition of the book was launched on 29 March 2011. As the sports achievers special edition, it pays special tribute to the Indian athletes in the 2010 Commonwealth Games and Asian Games.

The 25th edition marking the Silver Jubilee of the book's publication was launched on International Women’s Day in 2014.

The 26th edition of Limca Book of Records was launched at the Jaipur Literature Festival in January 2015.

The 27th edition of Limca Book of Records is The Specially Abled Edition in 2016.

== People of the Year ==
Since 1992, Limca Book of Records has featured 'People of the Year'. A panel of judges (including the editorial team) selects people who have consistently contributed to 'Indian excellence'.

== Other media ==
Coca-colaindia.com published an online Limca book of records archive featuring several landmark records set in India.

In 1996, the Indian national television channel Doordarshan broadcast 19 episodes of Limca Book Of Records Ki Anokhi Duniya which were hosted by Siddharth Kak and featured events from the book.

In 2008, Star TV News Channel aired Limca Book of Records Wah India Show on Saturdays and Sundays from April to December.

Siddarth Kak made the film Triumph of the Spirit about the Limca Book of Records. The film was broadcast by the National Geographic group Fox History and Entertainment channel in 2010.
