= Gold spot =

Gold Spot may refer to:

- Gold Spot, an Indian soft drink
- Goldspot, a music band
- Plusia festucae, called the gold spot moth
