= Bejois =

Bejois may refer to two Indian products:

- Bejois (brandy), a make of Brandy manufactured by Amrut Distilleries
- Bejois (drink), a mango drink brand
