= Duke and Sons =

Defunct Indian manufacturer of soft drinks

Duke and Sons Pvt. Ltd
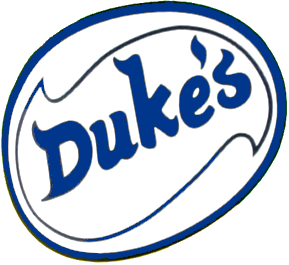

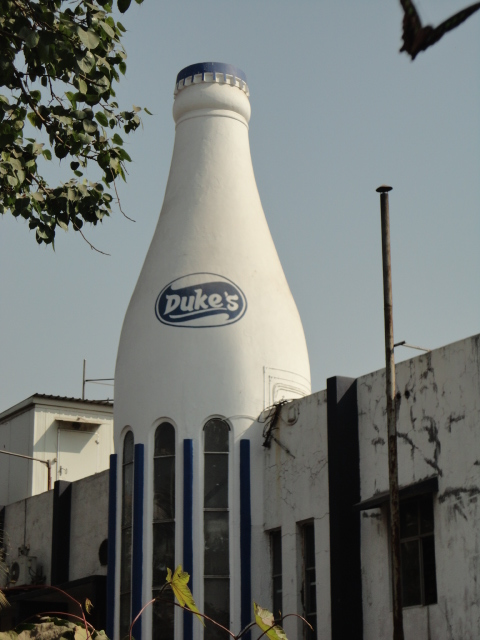
- The Duke's plant in Chembur
- Company type: Private
- Industry: Food
- Founded: 1889
- Founder: Dinshawji Pandole
- Defunct: 1994; 32 years ago
- Fate: Acquired by PepsiCo in 1994, became a brand
- Headquarters: Chembur, India
- Products: Soft drinks
- Brands: Duke's Lemonade; Duke's Mangola
- Owner: Pandole family (1889–1994)
- Parent: PepsiCo

Duke and Sons Pvt. Ltd was an Indian manufacturing company based in Mumbai. Established in 1889, Duke produced and marketed soft drinks. It was originally owned by the Pandole family, a well-known Parsi business name. In 1994, the company was acquired by Pepsi, which relaunched the Duke's brand in 2011 through its Indian subsidiary.

== History ==
Duke and Sons was founded by Dinshawji Cooverji Pandole. An avid cricketer, Dinshawji named his company after a cricket ball manufacturing company, Duke & Sons. The company used to manufacture Tango, Raspberry, Ginger, Pineapple, Lemonade and Mangola drinks under the "Duke's" brand. The Pandole family ran the company until 1994, when it was sold to PepsiCo. When sold, Duke's had a 55% market share in the segments it operated in Mumbai and Maharashtra.The sale was reportedly led by Darius Pandole.

Originally, Duke's manufactured lemonade from a shed in Byculla and later at Khetwadi areas of Mumbai. Its products were distributed by bullock cart and distribution was limited to Mumbai until 1940, when the company acquired Ford trucks. By 1989, the company had 90 distribution trucks. In 1970, the company established a manufacturing unit in the suburb of Chembur, with a production capacity of 19,000 crates per shift. When Coca-Cola first launched in India in the 1950s, Duke's launched Mangola, a mango flavoured juice drink to survive competition. Duke's Gingerade was popularly used when people had eaten too much or had an upset stomach, while the Raspberry drink was a favourite at Parsi weddings as well as a children's favourite. The Duke's brand is synonymous with Irani cafés in Mumbai.

Pepsico manufactured the drinks until 2004, when it discontinued all the drinks apart from Lemonade and Mangola. The decision was based on the fact that the drinks were marketed only in western India, while Pepsico wanted to concentrate on its national brands.

In December 2011, Pepsico announced that it was reviving the old flavours under the Duke's brand. Apart from reviving old drinks Raspberry soda, Gingerade and Ice-Cream soda, Pepsico announced the launch of a new drink, Mumbai Masala Soda under the Duke's brand. The relaunch included a bright new PET packaging as well as retro glass bottles in addition to an increased margin for small retailers, enticing them to prominently display the bottles in their shops. Pepsi relaunched Duke's Soda as well, as part of a strategy to increase market share with the help of regional brands.

In 2017, PepsiCo sold the defunct Duke's plant at Chembur for about Rs170 crore.

== Products ==
=== Duke's Mangola ===
Duke's Mangola is a mango flavoured drink marketed by PepsiCo in India. Originally owned by the Pundole family and part of Duke and Sons, Mangola was launched in the 1950s to counter Coca-Cola. Duke's was sold to Pepsico in 1994. Though Pepsico phased out most drinks under the Duke's brand in 2004, it retained lemonade and Mangola.

Marketed in western India, Duke's Mangola was the market leader in the segment in that region. Pepsico has been slowly merging Mangola with its other mango based drink, Slice. As of 2010, only one franchise of Mangola had been retained in Mumbai, since it was loyal to the brand.

=== Duke's Lemonade ===
Duke's Lemonade is a lemon based aerated drink marketed in India since 1889. The brand has a presence in western India. Originally owned by Duke and Sons, the brand was sold to PepsiCo in 1994. Pepsico phased out most drinks under the Duke's brand in 2004, though it retained Duke's Lemonade. Not only was Duke's Lemonade retained, in the same year Pepsico launched a new advertisement campaign in Mumbai to promote the brand, with a new tagline, "takatak taajgi".

Duke's Lemonade was once a favorite in Irani cafés. It is also used as a mixer with alcohol based drinks. In an interview in 2008, Ramesh Chauhan of Parle said that he had approached the owners of Duke's Lemonade, requesting them to share the formula for the drink with the promise not to market it in India, which was turned down. Chauhan decided to come up with his own formula, which he launched under the Limca brand in 1977.

==== Controversies ====
An investigation by The Financial Express in 2005 revealed that a sealed bottle of Duke's Lemonade contained a hair clip. Pepsico issued a statement stating that glass bottles go through an air wash system and are physically checked before reuse. The company attributed the incident to the possibility of the object being stuck to the bottom of the bottle, making it difficult to detect. In 2006, Indian authorities tested leading cola brands, including Duke's Lemonade and found that they contained high level of pesticides.
