= Bejois (drink) =

Indian brand of fruit drinks

Bejois is a brand of fruit drinks available in India. It comes in apple, mango, orange, grape, guava, and litchi flavors.

== Description ==
Bejois is a non-carbonated fruit drink from Jagdale Foods, the consumer division of Jagdale Industries Limited. Originally launched in 1986 as a mango drink, it has since diversified to include multiple flavors. The product competes with Maaza and Frooti. It is a popular drink among students of Christ (Deemed to be University).
