= Mangharam =

Mangharam may refer to:

- Mangharam Biscuit
- Mangharam Udharam Malkani
