= Tally of the Yes Men =

Studio album by Goldspot
- Released: August 23, 2005
- Genre: Indie rock
- Length: 41:06
- Label: Union

Goldspot chronology
| Tally of the Yes Men (2005) | And The Elephant is Dancing (2010) |

Tally of the Yes Men is the debut album by the indie rock band Goldspot, released on August 23, 2005.

== Critical reception ==
Professional ratings
Review scores
| Source | Rating |
|---|---|
| AllMusic | 3.5/5 stars |

PopMatters called the record "a solid album of slightly melancholic pop songs built around a solid core of vocal melodies and compelling instrumentation." The Los Angeles Times wrote that the album "washes down its classic pop songwriting with Cure Light (and other Britpop flavors), plus subtle Indian influences." LA Weekly wrote: "A triumph of quality over fashion, Goldspot are a collage of Radiohead’s acoustic yearnings, the Smiths’ smarty-pop, clean ’n’ cultured arrangements and main man Siddhartha’s eyelids-fluttering vibrato."

== Track listing ==
All songs written by Siddhartha Khosla and Ramy Antoun.

1. "Rewind" – 3:34
2. "Cusp" – 2:55
3. "Friday" – 4:17
4. "The Guard" – 3:00
5. "Time Bomb" – 4:12
6. "It's Getting Old" – 4:09
7. "The Feel Good Program of the Year" – 3:54
8. "So Fast" - 3:23
9. "The Assistant" - 4:06
10. "Motorcade" - 4:55
11. "In the Post" - 4:21

== Personnel ==
- Siddhartha Khosla
