= Maaza =

Indian fruit drink brand

- Type: Fruit juice
- Manufacturer: The Coca-Cola Company
- Origin: India
- Introduced: 1976
- Variants: Maaza Orange, Maaza Pineapple
- Related products: Slice, Frooti
- Website: coca-cola.com/in/en/brands/maaza

Maaza (pronounced "Mahza") is a fruit drink marketed in Africa, Europe and Asia. Its most popular drink is its mango fruit drink.

== History ==
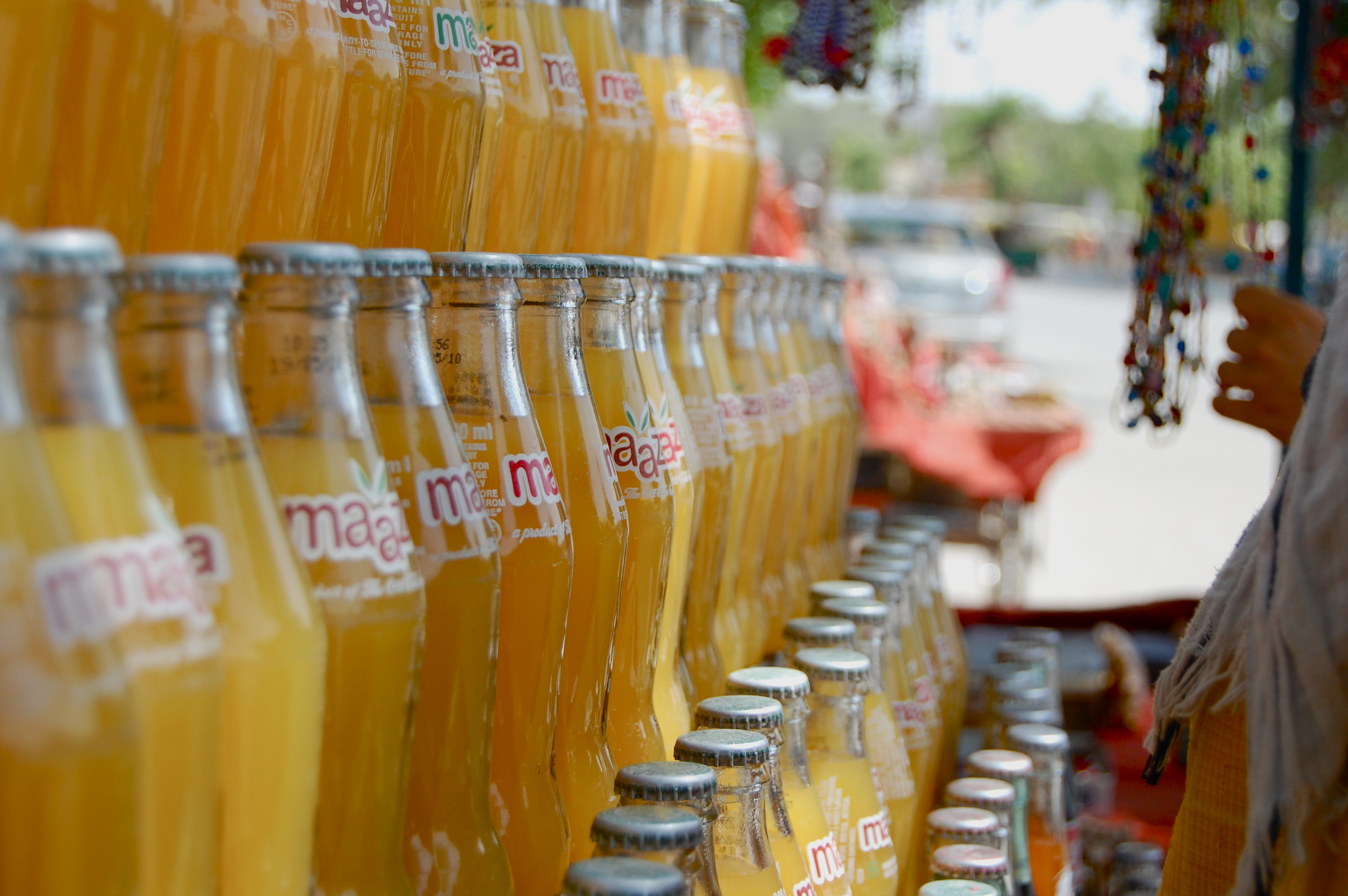
Maaza bottles

Maaza was launched in 1976 in India by Parle Bisleri as a shelf-stable interpretation of aamras, a traditional Western Indian mango drink.

Its success led to it being acquired by Coca-Cola in 1993 from Parle Bisleri along with other brands such as Limca, Citra, Thums Up and Gold Spot. The Union Beverages Factory, based in the United Arab Emirates, began selling it as a franchisee in the Middle East and Africa in 1976. By 1995, it owned the Maaza brand in these countries through Maaza International Co. LLC in Dubai.

Maaza was licensed by House of Spices in 2005 for the North American market. In 2006, Infra Foodbrands licensed Maaza for the European, Caribbean and West-African markets and cooperates with House of Spices for the North American market.

== Products ==
Initially, Coca-Cola had also launched Maaza with orange and pineapple fruit drinks in addition to their mango drink, but these variants were subsequently dropped. Coca-Cola later re-launched these variants in the Indian market.

Maaza's mango drink competes with Pepsi's Slice brand of mango drink and Frooti, manufactured by Parle Agro.

While Frooti was sold in small cartons, Maaza and Slice were initially sold in returnable bottles. However, all brands are also now available in small cartons and large PET bottles.

Maaza has a distinct pulpy taste as compared to Frooti and tastes slightly sweeter than Slice. Maaza claims to contain mango pulp of the Alphonso variety, which is known as the "King of Mangoes" in India.

Maaza is a popular household name in Dubai.
