= Citra (drink) =

Lemon-lime soda

- Type: Citrus flavored soda
- Manufacturer: The Coca-Cola Company
- Origin: India
- Introduced: 1980s, 2012
- Colour: Clear
- Flavour: Lemon and Lime

Citra was a clear lemon- and lime-flavoured soda sold in India in the 1980s and early 1990s. Citra was owned by Parle Bisleri. Along with other Parle brands, Thums Up, Limca, Gold Spot and Maaza, Citra was sold to Coca-Cola in 1993 in a deal that was reportedly worth $40 million. At the time of sale, the Parle brands together had a 60% market share in the aerated water industry. The brand was strong in South India. Citra was phased out by the year 2000 to make way for Coke's international brand, Sprite. Marketed as a "super cooler" targeting young consumers, Citra was positioned as a clear alternative to the cloudy Limca, more closely resembling traditional nimbu paani.

In 1998, Coke introduced a new drink in the US market also called Citra which was later renamed Fanta Citrus. Although the brand name was similar, this was a totally different grapefruit-based formula. In February 2012, Coke announced that it was reviving the Citra brand in rural areas of Maharashtra and Gujarat on a pilot basis, on a price strategy that will be 20% cheaper than other Coke and competitor brands. The relaunch was aimed at competing with smaller regional brands.
