= Sunfill =

Brand of soft drink

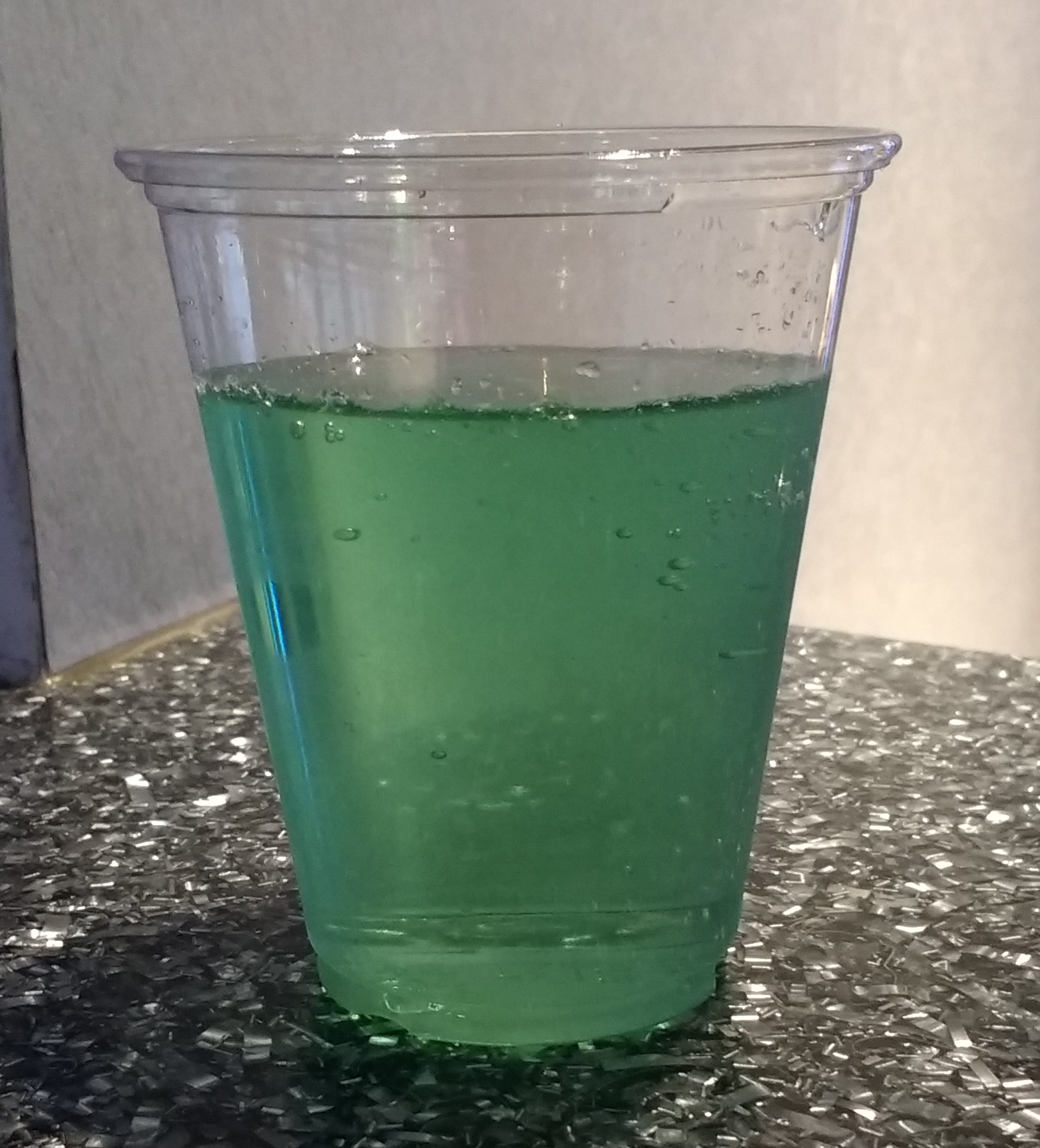
Sunfill (menthe) from a soda fountain at the World of Coca-Cola museum in Atlanta

Sunfill was a soft drink concentrate brand owned by Coca-Cola. Sunfill marked Coca-Cola's entry into the segment and was first launched in 2001 in India. Sunfill too did not do well, and was withdrawn from the Indian market in 2004, after it failed to break Rasna's monopoly in the segment. In 2011, Coke announced that Sunfill was being relaunched in India.

Sunfill was discontinued in 2013.
