= Urrak =

Alcoholic beverage

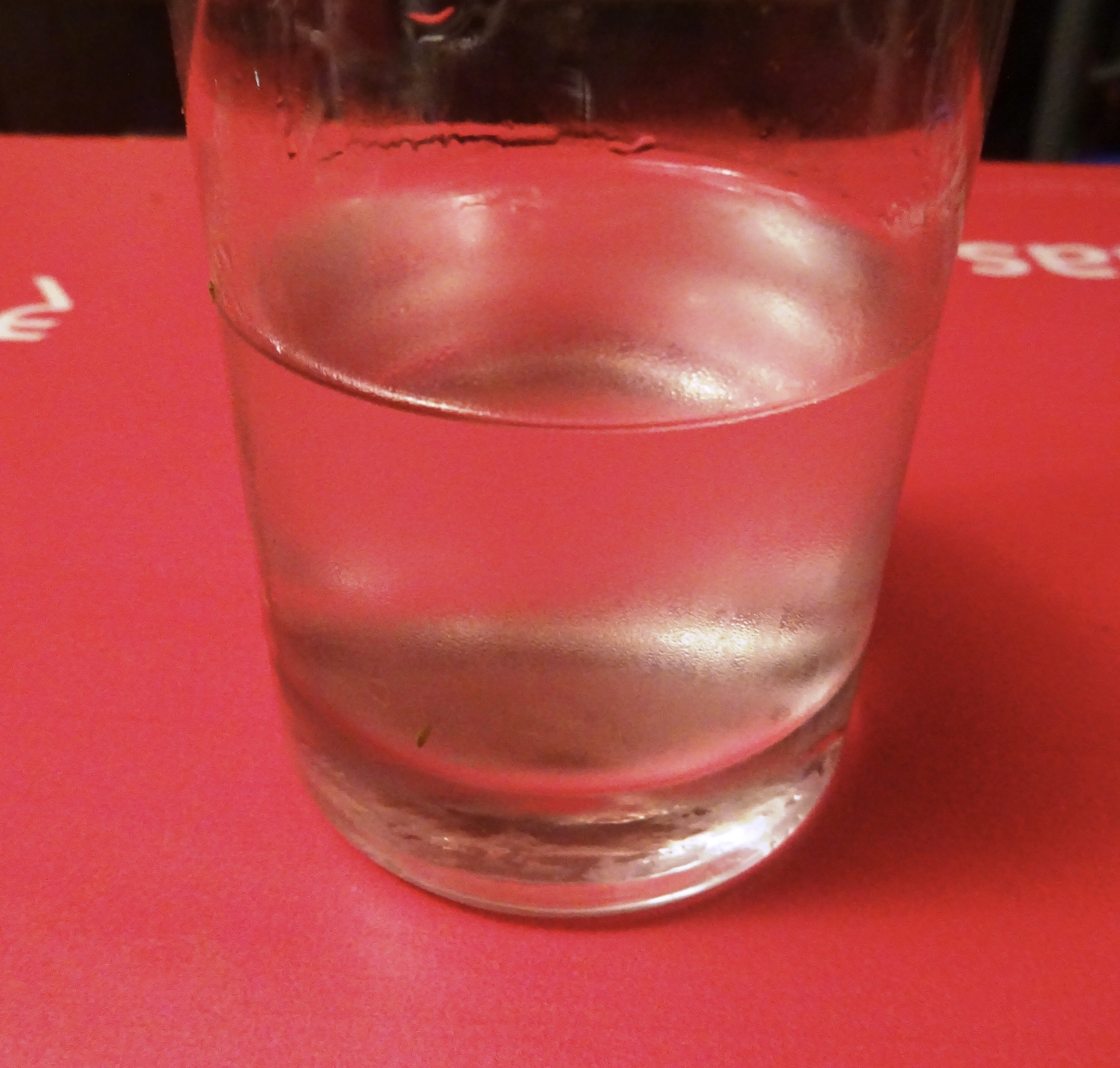
Urrak

Urrak or urak is an alcoholic beverage made every year across the Indian state of Goa in the first month of summer. It is very popular in the state's many local pubs and taverns. While feni is a double distilled alcoholic drink derived from fermentation of ripen cashew apple juice, urrak is a product of the first single distillation phase, completed in early spring. Urrak may contain sediments of the cashew apple, has very low shelf life compared to the feni, and must be consumed as fresh as possible after the extraction.

Urrak is obtained from the first single distillation process, containing an alcohol content of approximately 15-20%.

Feni is a double-distilled fine product of the same juice, and contains an alcohol content of approximately 40-45%. Feni comes with a good shelf life compared to urrak. Cashew feni is now also available under renowned brands.

== Making of feni ==
First, handpicked, tree-ripened and fallen cashew apples are stomped to gently extract the juices from the cashew apples, in a similar way as wine-making from grapes. Just like a brandy is distilled from grape wine, feni is distilled from cashew apple wine. In the first stripping run of the distillation process, a cashew apple wine is distilled into a light alcohol, urrak. It is the next distillation step, in which the master distiller for the village carefully controls the heat to allow the melange of water and alcohol to coax out the stronger second distillate (40-45%) spirit, which has less flavour but a stronger odour and a higher alcohol content. The flavours come entirely from the cashew apple and the earthen pot.

Traditionally, no flavours, colours, or aromas are added in to the final product, and it is consumed raw with a slice of lemon or green chili in another hand.

Nowadays, young distillers of the region have adopted European methods of aging. As a result one can find feni or urrak with flavours of Indian aromatic spices.
