= Franco Bordoni =

Italian aviator and racing car driver

Franco Bordoni-Bisleri
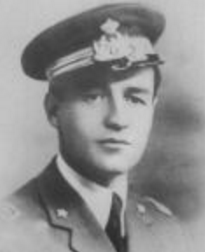
- Born: 10 January 1913; Milan, Italy
- Died: 15 September 1975 (aged 62); Chiavari
- Military career
- Allegiance: Italy
- Branch: Regia Aeronautica
- Service years: 1937 – 1943
- Rank: tenente
- Nickname: "Robur"
- Units: 18° Gruppo Caccia - 3° Stormo, Regia Aeronautica
- Conflicts: Second World War
- Awards: Medaglia d'Argento al valor Militare; Croce al Merito di Guerra

Franco Bordoni-Bisleri (10 January 1913 – 15 September 1975) was an Italian aviator and racing car driver. He is one of the top-scoring aces of the Regia Aeronautica, with 19 air victories. His nickname was "Robur" ("strength" in Latin) and was painted on most of his aircraft and racing cars.

== Early life ==
Bordoni was born in Milan. His grandfather was Felice Bisleri (1851–1921) who had started and owned the family-run Ferro-China-Bisleri amaro business. Franco studied at the Collegio San Carlo, one of the most exclusive private schools in the city. By the time he had completed his studies, he had already shown himself to be a talented car driver. The young Franco was attracted to flying by the lure of the speed.

He became a civil pilot (1936) but failed in his efforts to join the Italian Royal Air Force (Regia Aeronautica), due to a minor nasal problem. He finally succeeded in entering the service as a temporary Sottotenente in 1937 and got a military aviation license that allowed him to fly combat missions in World War II.

== World War II ==
When Italy entered the war in June 1940, Bordoni rejoined the Regia Aeronautica. He was sent to 95^{a} Squadriglia of 18° Gruppo, based at the Albenga airfield, during the fighting against France and was then assigned to the Italian Air Corps (Corpo Aereo Italiano). In October he arrived in Belgium for the last part of the Battle of Britain. He recalled: "My first visit to Libya was in August 1940... I returned on 29 January 1941 when I served with 18° Gruppo (3° Stormo) until 14 August 1941."

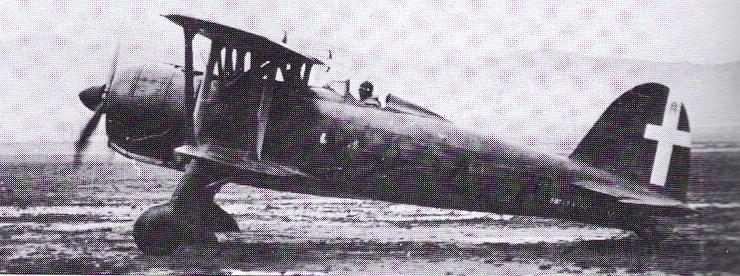
A Fiat CR.42 in Regia Aeronautica service – Bordoni achieved his first air victory flying the nimble Fiat biplane, shooting down a Bristol Blenheim, 100 km (62 mi) east of Benghazi on 10 March 1941

Bordoni, who had his nickname "Robur" (related to the family brand) painted on his plane, obtained his first air victory on 10 March 1941: flying a Fiat CR.42 for 95^{a} Squadriglia, he shot down a Bristol Blenheim, 100 kilometres (62 mi) east of Benghazi. On 14 April, still flying a CR.42, he attacked – together with some Fiat G.50 fighters from 155° Gruppo Autonomo C.T. – some Mk.I Hawker Hurricanes from Fighter Squadron 73 that were bouncing a Junkers Ju 87 Stuka in action over Tobruk bay. During the dogfight, Bordoni-Bisleri downed the Hurricane flown by Pilot Officer Lamb. According to other sources, Bisleri shot down the Hurricane Mk.I V7553 "TP-E" of Flight Sergeant Herbert Garth Webster (RAF No. 519739), who was killed. Three days later, 17 April, he claimed another Blenheim, destroyed 40 kilometres (25 mi) east of Derna.

In May, while his unit was stationed in Benghazi, he was promoted to Tenente and was awarded his first Medaglia d'argento al valore militare and the German Iron Cross. On 2 June he shot down two more Blenheims, over the Port of Benghazi and 20 kilometres (12 mi) off the coast, but his CR.42 was damaged by defensive fire. For these claims he was awarded his second Medaglia d'argento al valore militare. On the evening of 28 July 1941 he and one other CR.42 took part in an attack on a British submarine south of Benghazi together with five Ju 87s. It is possible that the submarine was HMS Union, which was claimed to have been sunk. "In 1941 – he remembered – the CR.42 was a good aircraft, easy to fly, strong and manoeuvrable, but it lacked sufficient speed and armament. It was possible to fight Gladiators, Blenheims and Wellingtons in this aircraft, but against other aircraft it was outclassed."

Upon returning to Italy in August of the same year, 18° Gruppo was re-equipped with the Fiat G.50. By the time they were moved to Greece, the 18° had shifted to the Macchi C.200 Saetta, but the unit never encountered any enemy planes in Greece.

In the beginning of October 1942 the 3° Stormo pilots started to receive their first MC.202s as replacements for lost MC.200s. "The situation became very different – he recalled – as with this new aircraft it was possible to successfully combat Hurricanes and P-40s and it was easier to intercept bombers." The score of Bisleri started to rise. On 20 October he claimed a twin-engined bomber over Fuka. In fact, during the day a Martin Baltimore was lost over El Daba and a Martin Maryland from 203 Squadron was also lost and it is possible that Bordoni-Bisleri's claim matches these losses.

A Macchi C.202, probably in Libya: flying this effective dogfighter, Bordoni achieved many of his air victories.

Six days later, on 26 October, Bordoni-Bisleri (83^{a} Squadriglia, 18° Gruppo) with eleven other pilots of 3° Stormo and seven from 4° (all flying 202s) attacked a wide formation of thirty Kittyhawks and seventeen Spitfires covering twelve Bostons and six Baltimores, in the Fuka and Daba areas. Bordoni-Bisleri claimed one of the Kittyhawks, which crash-landed about 15 kilometres (9.3 mi) southeast of Fuka but according to some sources the same kill was claimed by Tenente Vittorio Squarcia (73^{a} Squadriglia). The downed Kittyhawk was piloted by Flying Officer J. G. Meredith. Bisleri claimed another Kittyhawk, on 30 October, over El Kattara, in El Alamein area, while returning from a reconnaissance flight. On 1 November 1942, he and his wingman Tenente Caetani attacked 15 P-40s on the road Sidi el Barrani – Marsa Matrouh. Bordoni-Bisleri shot down two P-40s and Caetani claimed a third. For this achievement they were awarded a Medaglia d'argento al valore militare (Bordoni-Bisleri's third).

Three days later on 4 November, Bordoni-Bisleri, with Capitano Mario Pinna of 74^{a} Squadriglia and Sergente Maggiore Francesco Cuscuna of 75^{a} Squadriglia intercepted three P-40 Kittyhawks. Near their airfield at Abu Smeit, Bordoni-Bisleri shot down one of the Curtiss fighters that, moments before, had hit Pinna, forcing him to bale out badly wounded in his face and on his hands.

On 30 July 1943 some Italian pilots attacked a formation of B-17s escorted by P-38s over Rome. Flying his C.205, Bordoni-Bisleri shot down a B-17 (kill number 13) over Pratica di Mare, firing 800 rounds of 12.7 mm ammunition. Some sources claims that this claim was shared with Sergente Mantelli. In two combat missions on 11 August he downed two more B-17s. The first fell in the sea, off Civitavecchia. The second four-engine bomber was shot down from 8,500 metres (27,900 ft) and fell northeast of Bracciano lake.

While flying one of the older MC.202s, on 19 August, he claimed a B-26 off the coast of Ostia, still near Rome. The following day he was promoted Comandante (flight commander) of 83^{a} Squadriglia. On 21 August, still flying a C.202, he fired 630 rounds of 12.7 mm ammunition at a B-17 that fell near the Pomigliano d' Arco railway station (Naples). Nine days later (30 August 1943), Bordoni, now flying again a C.205, destroyed a B-17 near Viterbo, with 430 rounds of 20 mm and 400 rounds of 12.7 mm ammunition.

Regia Aeronautica C.205V. Bordoni was one of the very few Regia Aeronautica pilots allowed to fly this outstanding dogfighter.

He obtained his last air victory with 83^{a} Squadriglia, in 3° Stormo, flying a C.205. On 5 September 1943, just three days before Italian armistice of Cassibile he shot down a B-17 Flying Fortress, off Civitavecchia, on the Latium coast.

Bordoni-Bisleri ended the conflict "with 19 victories with CR.42s and C.202s. Twelve were over Libya and the final seven were American bombers." Six were Curtiss P-40s and four were Blenheims.

== Sports car racing ==
After the war, Bordoni became president of the family's liquor company and started a career in sports car racing. He went on to become one of Europe's leading amateur drivers during the 1950s. He continued to use the "Robur" logo and slogan (featuring a fighting lion) also seen on the liquor bottles.

The debut came in 1949, driving a Fiat 1100 B in the Mille Miglia. In 1950 he scored his first victory in the Coppa Inter-Europa at Monza in a Maserati A6. He took further wins later the same year and the following, driving a Dagrada-Fiat Sport 750 at Modena, Circuito del Castello in Teramo and in the Coppa Ascoli at Circuito delle Caldaie.

In 1952 he won the 1.1 liter class of the Bari Grand Prix in an O.S.C.A.

In 1953 he became Italian Sportscar Champion, driving a Gordini T15S in which he won the Coupe de Vitesse at the Autodrome de Montlhéry, the Trullo d'Oro at the Castellana circuit and the Pergusa Grand Prix.

The 1954 season saw him repeat his wins of the Trullo d'Oro and the Pergusa Grand Prix as well as winning the Trieste-Opicina hillclimb.

In 1955 he was offered a position driving for the Maserati factory team, Officine Alfieri Maserati, and got the chance to race a number of different models. He drove a Maserati 300S in the 10 Hours of Messina, the RAC Tourist Trophy at Dundrod and won his second Trieste-Opicina hillclimb with it. In the Targa Florio, driving a Maserati 200S, he had to retire from the race. He had more luck with a Maserati A6GCS, that brought him his third victory in the Pergusa Grand Prix.

Bordoni continued to drive for Maserati during the following years. His last victory came at the 1957 Grand Prix des Frontières. He retired from racing in 1959 at the age of 46.

== Death ==
Bordoni-Bisleri died in a plane crash on 15 September 1975. He was coming back from Rome after a commemoration of parachutists, attended by Pope Paul VI and organized by the Aero Club of Milan, of which he was President. He was flying a SIAI Marchetti F.260, accompanied by his ten-year-old son, Franchino, and a friend, Gianni Allegri. Near Chiavari, in Liguria, they met a heavy storm and the plane crashed on Mount Anchetta, fatally injuring everybody on board. His death had considerable press coverage at the time, although little was mentioned of his past with the Regia Aeronautica.

== Awards ==
- Silver Medal of Military Valor (three times during World War II)
- Iron Cross 2nd class (1939)

== Formula One World Championship results ==
(key) (Races in bold indicate pole position; Races in italics indicate fastest lap)

Year	Entrant	Chassis	Engine	1	2	3	4	5	6	7	WDC	Points
1950	Enrico Platé	Talbot-Lago 700	Talbot L6	GBR	MON	500	SUI	BEL	FRA	ITA; DNA	NC	0

== See also ==
- List of World War II aces from Italy

== Bibliography ==
- Lucas, Laddie (ed.). Wings of War: Airmen of All Nations Tell their Stories 1939–1945. London: Hutchinson, 1983. ISBN 0-09-154280-4.
- Malizia, Nicola. Fiat G-50 (Aviolibri Records No. 2) (in Italian/English). Roma Istituto Bibliografico Napoleone, 2005. ISBN 88-7565-002-0.
