= Goldspot =

American band

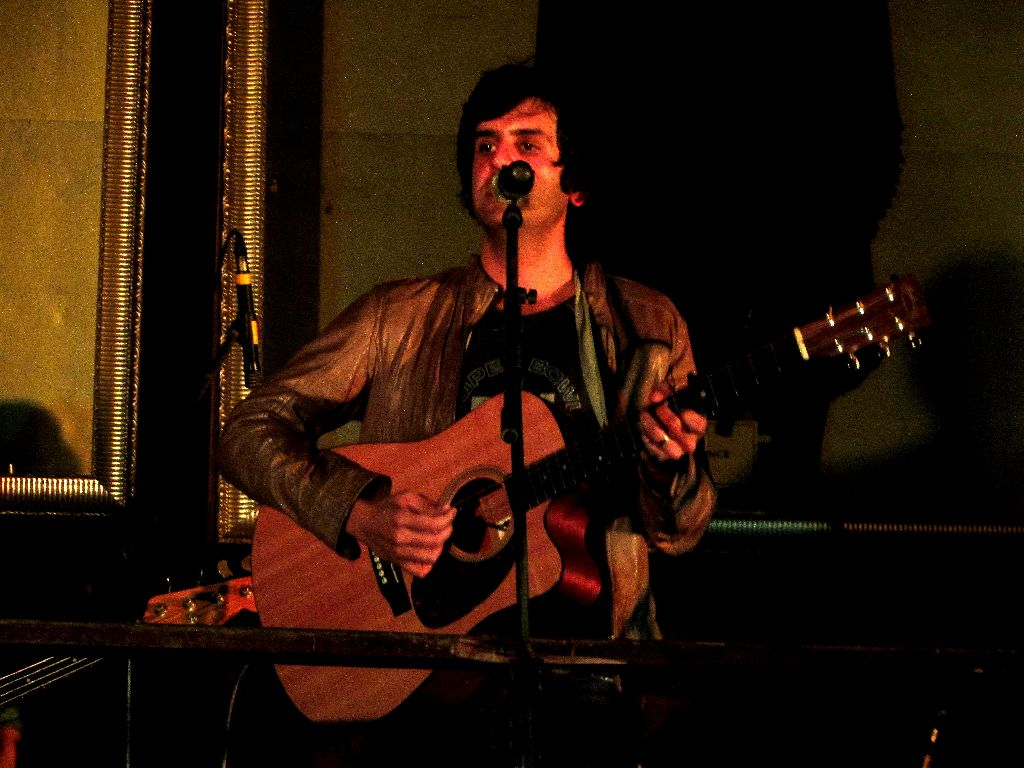
- Frontman Siddhartha Khosla of Goldspot performs in Bangalore in 2012

Background information
- Origin: Los Angeles, California, U.S.
- Genres: Indie rock, alternative rock, indie pop
- Years active: 2001–present
- Labels: Mercury Records, Union Records
- Past members: Ramy Antoun, Seth McLain, Sergio Andrade, Derek Horst
- Website: Official website

Goldspot is a New York–based band. Founded by singer/songwriter/producer and television and film composer Siddhartha Khosla. The group's debut album was Tally of the Yes Men, the second album And The Elephant is Dancing. The band released its third full-length, Aerogramme, in 2013.

== History ==
The Los Angeles–based band Goldspot is named after the fizzy drink Gold Spot. According to an interview with Siddhartha Khosla (the band's core member), the drink was very popular back in India at the time.

After a live performance on DJ Nic Harcourt's KCRW show, the band soon began playing shows across Los Angeles in venues like The Troubadour and Hotel Cafe. Harcourt championed the band, hailing them as his "favorite band of 2005", and began playing tracks from Tally of the Yes Men in heavy rotation ("Rewind", "Time Bomb", and "Friday").

The band was founded by singer/songwriter Siddhartha Khosla and writer/producer/drummer Ramy Antoun. From 2005 to 2007, the line up consisted of Sid, Ramy, Sergio Andrade (bass), Seth McLain (guitars, keys and backing vocals) and Derek Horst (guitars and backing vocals). The band signed a record deal in 2005 with a start-up, independent label Union Records, with distribution through ADA. Thanks to KCRW's heavy airplay they were able to sell 10,000 copies of their debut Tally of the Yes Men. Tally was co-produced by Jeff Peters and Goldspot. Respected radio stations KEXP and WTMD, along with other indie radio stations across the country, began to play the record in constant rotation.

Eventually, the band signed a deal with major record label Mercury Records (Universal Music Group) in the United Kingdom. An alternate version of Tally was released in the UK in June 2007, featuring A. R. Rahman's Bollywood Orchestra, and received plaudits from UK press like Q magazine, the Sunday Times, and The Guardian. The Sunday Times hailed Goldspot as "the best band to come out of America in years".

Tally reached No. 10 in the alternative charts. The debut single "It's Getting Old" was the second most downloaded iTunes Single of the Week ever, behind Justin Timberlake. The follow-up single "Friday" was BBC Radio 2's "Record of the Week" and reached No. 21 in the UK airplay charts. The band also released a Hindi version of the same track which reached No. 4 in the BBC Asian Network Charts. "Friday"'s video appeared in regular rotation on MTV, VH1, "The Hits", "The Box", Q, and Sky television networks. Khosla also performed the single in Hindi.

Tally made several "Top Albums of 2007" lists. Goldspot was named the No. 4 best new act of 2007, and Tally was named in the Sunday Times' "Top Albums of 2007".

Goldspot also played the Glastonbury (headlined by The Arcade Fire and Björk), O2 Wireless, and V festivals throughout the summer of 2007. The band has opened for Travis, Death Cab for Cutie, Franz Ferdinand, and Bon Jovi.

Follow-up album And the Elephant is Dancing, produced by Beach Boys engineer Jeff Peters and Siddhartha, was released digitally on November 2, 2009. Music supervisor and influential DJ Nic Harcourt (KCRW) hailed Goldspot as "one of my favorite bands of the moment", and called the band's new album "a classic and timeless gem...it's as if George Harrison never left India". The band appeared on NPR's Tell Me More with Michel Martin in April 2010 as well as influential radio shows KCRW's Morning Becomes Eclectic with Jason Bentley and WTMD (Baltimore) in 2010, where they performed songs off the new album. Songs from Elephants have appeared in dozens of major network television shows and films.

The band's newest release, Aerogramme, on Khosla and co.'s own Mt. Hoboken Records/Nice Music Group recounts the travels of Khosla's family from India to the US in the late 1970s. Lead single "The Border Line" received consistent airplay on US radio (including Sirius XM's "The Spectrum" and several other Triple A-format stations around the country). The album was released to very positive reviews, including the Los Angeles Times' pop music editor naming it the #1 album of 2013. Aerogramme was released under Sony India for several South Asian countries.

On May 1, 2014, Goldspot was nominated for a Vh1 India Music Award: "Best Global Indian."

== Television, film, and placements ==
Khosla is currently the composer for Hulu's Only Murders in the Building. His recent credits include NBC's This Is Us, Fox comedy Grandfathered, Lionsgate/E!'s The Royals and Hulu's Runaways, and feature films Fat Camp and Liv. He composed original songs for the musical film Basmati Blues and ABC series The Neighbors. He also wrote original songs for the series, including a Bollywood musical episode that aired on March 17, 2014.

Khosla co-wrote the track "Flirting" with Natalie Imbruglia which appeared on her 2009 album Come to Life.

The band's song "Rewind" was featured in the "Double Date" episode of How I Met Your Mother.

Their songs also featured in the 2009 movie Today's Special and the music video for Ina Mina Dika was shot for the movie featuring actor Aasif Mandvi.

== Discography ==
=== Studio albums ===
- Tally of the Yes Men – Mercury Records/Universal Music Group (2007), SONY BMG (India) (2008) (UK Alternative Charts No. 10)
- And the Elephant is Dancing (2010)
- Aerogramme – Mt. Hoboken Records/Nice Music Group (August 20, 2013), SONY Music (India) (October 15, 2013)

=== Singles ===
- "Friday" (2007) (UK Alternative No. 21, BBC Asian Network No. 4)
- "It's Getting Old" (2007) (UK Alternative No. 10)
- "Ina Mina Dika" (2011)
- "The Border Line" (2013)
