= Bisleri =

Indian bottled water company

Bisleri International Pvt. Ltd.
- Formerly: Parle Exports Pvt. Ltd.
- Type: Private
- Industry: Beverages
- Predecessor: Parle Group
- Founded: 1969
- Founder: Ramesh Chauhan
- Headquarters: Mumbai, Maharashtra, India
- Area served: Worldwide
- Key people: Ramesh Chauhan (Chairman); Angelo George (CEO); Jayanti Chauhan (Director); Zainab Chauhan (Director)
- Products: Mineral water Carbonated drinks
- Brands: Bisleri; Vedica; Limonata; Rev; Pop; Spyci Jeera
- Revenue: ▲₹2,689 crore (US$280 million) (FY24)
- Net income: ▲₹316 crore (US$33 million) (FY24)
- Website: www.bisleri.com

Bisleri International (formerly Parle Exports and Parle Bisleri) is an Indian multinational company which is best known for the eponymous brand of bottled water. The company was started in 1969 by Ramesh Chauhan, and sells bottled water and soft drinks.

Bisleri conducts most of its business in India, with 150 operational plants and a network of 6,000 distributors and 7,500 distribution trucks. Bisleri also sells its products through its own e-commerce platform and other online retailers.

== History ==
=== Background ===
In 1966, Italian doctor Cesari Rossi and Indian businessman Khushroo Suntook introduced Bisleri bottled water in India by setting up a factory in Thane. It was named after an Italian alcohol remedy drink created by 19th century inventor Felice Bisleri. Bisleri was initially sold only in luxury hotels and restaurants in Mumbai in glass bottles in two varieties – bubbly and still. In 1969, the Jayantilal Chauhan family of Parle Group acquired the struggling Bisleri brand, which was looking to exit the Indian market, for ₹4 lakh (about US$50,000 then).

=== Early years ===
In the 1970s, Jayantilal Chauhan split his soft drinks business between his two sons; Prakash Chauhan obtained control of Parle Agro, while Ramesh Chauhan received Parle Exports (now Bisleri International).

In 1976, Parle Exports launched Maaza, a fruit drink made of mango pulp. After the exit of The Coca-Cola Company from India in 1977, Parle Exports entered the carbonated drinks segment with the launch of cola drink Thums Up, lemon flavoured drink Limca and orange flavoured drink Gold Spot.

To complement its soft drinks portfolio, Parle Exports launched mineral water and carbonated water in the retail market under the previously acquired Bisleri brand name. According to Chauhan, the Italian name "added a dash of class to it." The water was initially sold in PVC bottles, before the company switched to PET bottles in the mid-1980s.

=== Divestments ===
The economic liberalisation in India in 1991 saw the return of The Coca-Cola Company in the country. In 1993, Parle Exports sold its carbonated drinks brands Thums Up, Limca, Gold Spot, Citra and RimZim to The Coca-Cola Company for between ₹125 crore (about US$40 million) and ₹200 crore (about US$60 million). In addition, it sold Maaza trademark in the Indian market to The Coca-Cola Company. The deal also included a 15-year non-compete clause, which prevented Parle Exports from launching competing carbonated drinks until 2008.

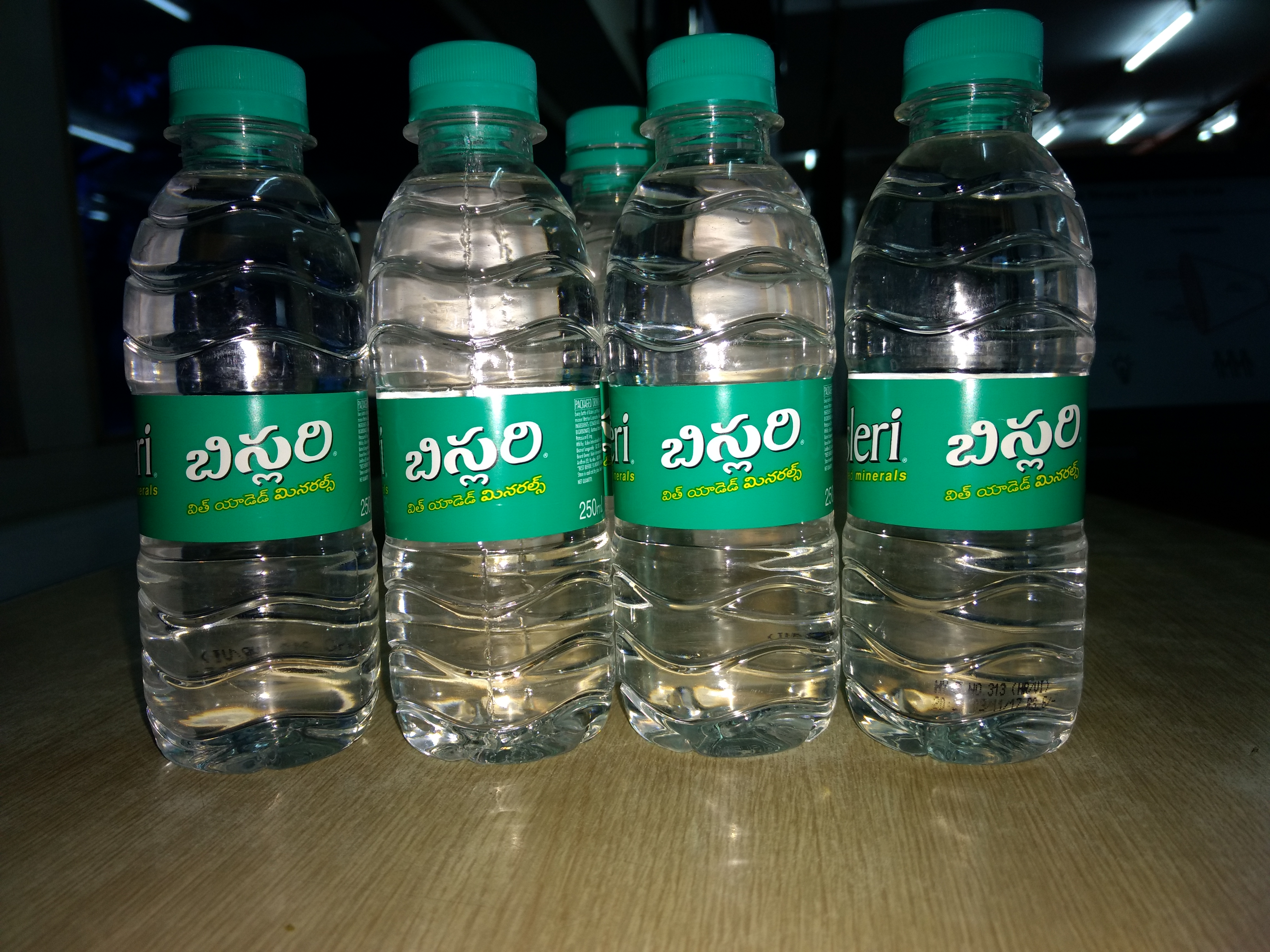
Bisleri 250ml bottles with Telugu language labels

In 1998, Ramesh Chauhan sold Delhi Bottling Company and Coolaid, the bottling companies of the five carbonated drink brands, to The Coca-Cola Company.

In 2000, Ramesh Chauhan announced that Bisleri, which was being operated by eight different companies from 16 manufacturing locations, would be consolidated under a single entity. As a result, Bisleri International was incorporated in 2001.

In 2006, the company sold the trademark of Maaza in European and US markets to Infra Beverages and House of Spice respectively for undisclosed amounts.

=== Present ===
In 2010, Bisleri launched a premium bottled water brand called Vedica, with water sourced from a spring in the Himalayan foothills in Uttarakhand. In 2014, Bisleri introduced an energy drink brand called Urzza, before discontinuing the product three years later. In 2016, Bisleri re-entered carbonated drinks segment with the creation of Bisleri Pop under which it launched four varieties of soft drinks – Limonata, Fonzo, Spyci and Pina Colada.

In 2021, Bisleri launched its line of hand sanitizer products. In 2023, Bisleri expanded into the United Arab Emirates.

== Partnerships ==
Bisleri is the "official hydration partner" of five clubs of the Indian Super League (ISL) and five teams of the Indian Premier League (IPL).

== Product ==
Bisleri has a 32% market share in the organized bottled water segment, in which it mainly competes with PepsiCo's Aquafina, The Coca-Cola Company's Kinley, Parle Agro's Bailley and IRCTC's Rail Neer. Bisleri is often used as a generic term for bottled water in India. Many knockoff brands of similar spelling and branding have emerged over the years.
