= Parle Agro =

Indian beverage company

Parle Agro Private Limited
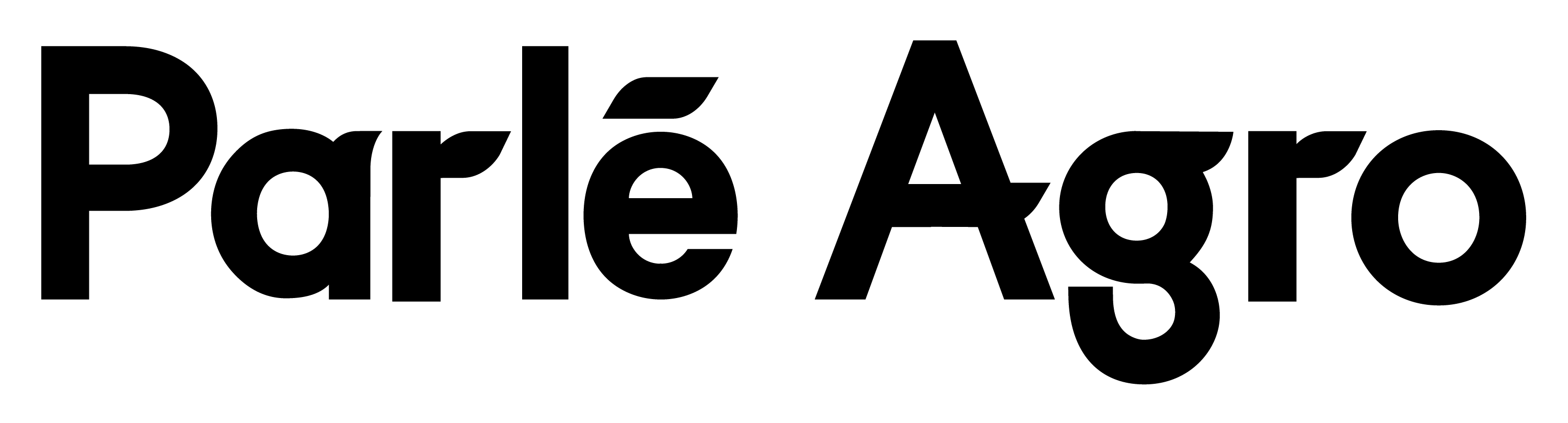
- Company type: Private
- Industry: Consumer goods
- Founded: 1984; 42 years ago
- Headquarters: Mumbai, India
- Area served: Worldwide
- Key people: Prakash Jayantilal Chauhan (Chairman & MD); Schauna Chauhan (CEO); Alisha Chauhan (Director); Nadia Chauhan (Director)
- Products: Frooti; Appy Fizz; Bailley; Frio Cola; Frio Orange; Frio Lemon; Smoodh; Dhishoom
- Revenue: ▼₹3,126 crore (US$330 million) (FY24)
- Number of employees: 5,500+
- Website: www.parleagro.com

Parle Agro Private Limited (stylised as Parlé Agro) is an Indian multinational foods products company that owns Frooti, Appy Fizz, LMN, Hippo, Bailley and Smoodh brands.

== History ==
Parle Agro is an offshoot of Parle Products, which was founded in 1929 in British India. It was owned by the Chauhan family of Vile Parle, Mumbai. The original Parle company was split into three separate companies owned by the different factions of the original Chauhan family:

- Parle Products, led by Vijay, Sharad and Raj Chauhan (owner of the brands Parle-G, Melody, Mango Bite, Poppins, Kismi Toffee Bar, Monaco and Krack Jack)
- Parle Agro, led by Prakash Chauhan and his daughters (owner of the brands such as Frooti and Appy Fizz)
- Parle Bisleri, led by Ramesh Chauhan

All three companies continue to use the family trademark name "Parle".

Parle Agro commenced operations in 1984. It started with beverages, and later diversified into bottled water (1993), plastic packaging (1996) and confectionery (2007). Frooti, the first product rolled out of Parle Agro in 1985, became the largest selling mango drink in India.

The original Parle group was amicably segregated into three non-competing businesses. But a dispute over the use of "Parle" brand arose, when Parle Agro diversified into the confectionery business, thus becoming a competitor to Parle Products. In February 2008, Parle Products sued Parle Agro for using the brand Parle for competing confectionery products. Later, Parle Agro launched its confectionery products under a new design which did not include the Parle brand name. In 2009, the Bombay High Court ruled that Parle Agro can sell its confectionery brands under the brand name Parle or Parle Confi on condition that it clearly specifies that its products belong to a separate company, which has no relationship with Parle Products.

== Parle Agro brands ==
Parle Agro Pvt. Ltd operates under three major business verticals:

- Beverages – fruit drinks, nectars, juice, sparkling drinks
- Water – packaged drinking water
- Foods – confectionery, snacks

Parle Agro also diversified into production of PET preforms (semi-finished bottles) in 1996. Its customers include companies in the beverages, edible oil, confectionery and pharmaceutical segments.

=== Beverages ===
Frooti
Launched in 1985, Frooti was India's only beverage sold in a Tetra Pak packaging at the time. It went on to become the largest selling Mango drink in the country.
Appy
Appy Classic was launched in 1986 as an apple nectar and originally available in a white Tetra Pak packaging with an apple and leaf graphic. As of 2011, it comes in black Tetra Pak packaging. It was the first apple nectar to be launched in India.
Appy Fizz
Launched in 2005, Appy Fizz is India's first sparkling apple drink available in a champagne shaped PET bottle.
Saint Juice
Launched in 2008, Saint Juice is available in three variants – Orange, Mixed fruit, Grape and Apple. At the time of its launch, its USP was "100% juice with no added color, sugar or preservatives".
LMN
LMN was launched in March 2009, as non-carbonated lemon drink (nimbu paani or lemonade).
Grappo Fizz
Launched in 2008, Grappo Fizz is a sparkling grape juice drink. Grappo Fizz is along the lines of Parle Agro's existing product Appy Fizz.
Dhishoom
In 2012, Parle Agro launched India's first Jeera Masala Soda, Dhishoom.
Frio
Frio is a range of flavoured carbonated drinks. It is currently available in 3 flavours – Lemon, Orange, and Cola.
Cafe Cuba
Launched on 19 May 2013, Cafe Cuba is a carbonated Cuban coffee, more of a bottled Espresso.
Flavour: Strong Coffee with little sugar.
Bailley Soda
Launched in 2010, Bailley Soda has its packaging theme inspired by military colours and also the bottles are shaped like a grenade.
Frooti Fizz
Launched in March 2017, Frooti Fizz is a sparkling mango juice drink. Bollywood actress Alia Bhatt signed a deal with Parle Agro to endorse the product. Frooti Fizz is available in 250ml PET bottle, 500ml PET bottle and 250ml can.
Smoodh
Launched in 2021, the drink is Parle Agro's entry into the flavoured milk market. The drinks were launched at ₹10 per 85ml pack.

=== Water ===
- Parle Agro have launched Bailley packaged drinking water.
- It has also introduced pouches of drinking water.
- Since water in pouches is not permitted in Maharashtra State, it is not available in this form.

=== Food ===
==== Confectionary ====
- Mintrox mints (launched in 2008), hard mint sweets available in 2 flavours.
- Buttercup sweets (launched in 2008), hard boiled sweets.
- Buttercup Softease, a toffee available in 4 flavours.
- Softease Mithai, a toffee available in 3 flavours.
- Kaccha Aam, a toffee.

==== Snacks ====
- Hippo Namkeens is an assortment of traditional snacks from various parts of India. Hippo Namkeens is available in a range of seven traditional Indian snacks: Aloo Bhujia, Chana Dal, Moong Dal, Sev Bhujia, Masala Peanuts, Khatta Meetha, and Navratan Mixture. It was ultimately discontinued from production in 2019.

== See also ==
- Frooti
- Appy Fizz
