= Mangharam Biscuit =

Indian Food & products company

J. B. Mangharam & Company was a maker of biscuits in India. It was founded in 1919. It was named after three brothers Jeevan Das, Bal Chand and Mangha Ram Pamnani.Their factory in Sakkur also made candy and medicines. During the World War II, they obtained a contract to make special "energy biscuits" for the British Army. After the partition of India, they moved their business to Gwalior in India.

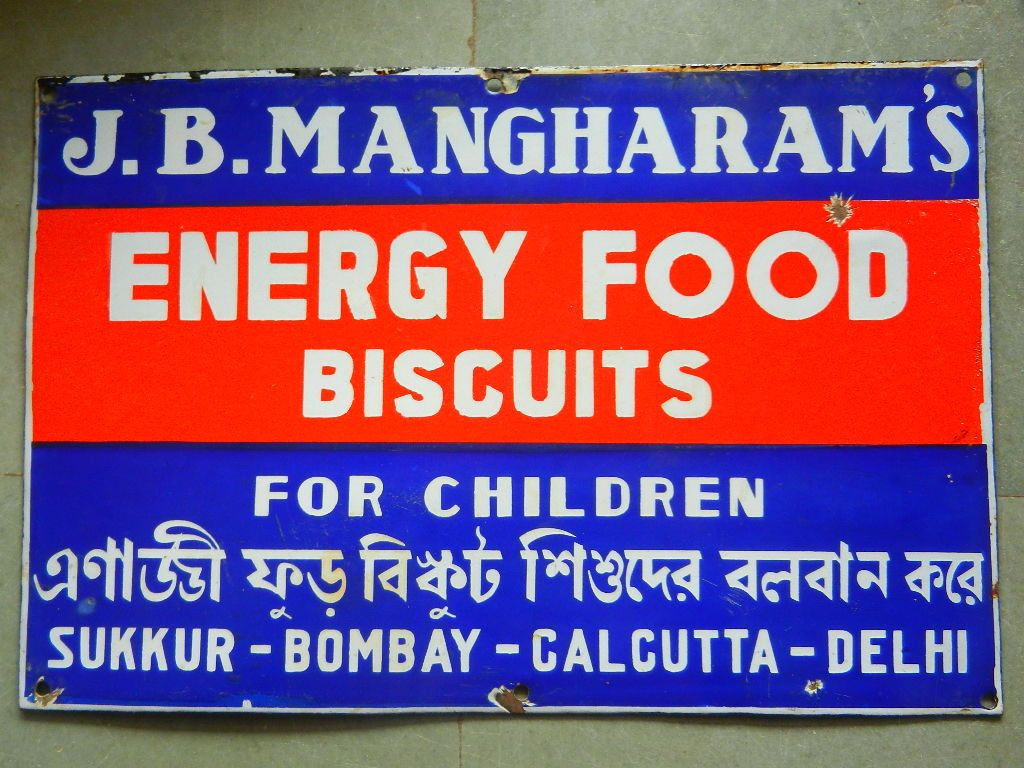
Vintage J. B. Mangharam's Energy Food Biscuits Ad Porcelain Sign Board from 1930s or 40s

In 1950s they were the largest biscuit producer in Asia and produced several type of biscuits and confectioneries. They were initially famous for their "Energy Food" biscuits made using glucose. They were originally intended for British soldiers, but became popular among children. Later they were also known for the cream wafer biscuits.

The Mangharams were originally from Sukkur Sindh, but had branches in Bombay, Calcutta and Delhi. The Gwalior factory was established in 1951. After the death of Mangharam Pamnanni, the company was restructured in 1969 and 1977 and in 1983 became a part of the Britannia Industries Ltd and no longer produces biscuits with the J.B Mangharam label. A branch of the family settled in Hyderabad where they produce chocolate making machinery and supplies.

The Sukkur factory was established in 1937. During the partition of India, the building was declared evacuee property and after partition it was allotted to Muhammad Yakoob and was renamed Yacoob Biscuit Factory.

It was once considered of the top few Sindhi owned companies along with Kaycee's Blue Star, Motwaney's Chicago Radio. The Mangharam family arrived in Gwalior sometime in 1940s. They negotiated special tax concessions with the then Madhya Bharat government. As a result of their support a large number of Sindhis came and settled in Gwalior after the partition.

The brightly colored tins of J.B. Mangharam biscuits and sweets produced in 1950s and 1960s, featuring pictures from Indian tradition (Shakuntala and Bharat, Mira Bai, baby Krishna, Krishna with flute) and selected cities (Mumbai VT, Kolkata Howra Bridge, Amritsar Golden temple) are now regarded as collectibles.

== See also ==
- Parle-G Parle Glucose biscuits
