= Parle-G =

Brand of Indian biscuits manufactured by Parle Products

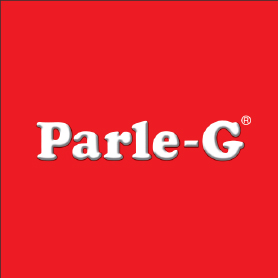
- Current owner: Parle Products
- Country: India
- Introduced: 1939; 87 years ago
- Markets: Worldwide
- Tagline: "G for Genius"
- Website: parleproducts.com

Parle-G is a brand of biscuits manufactured by Parle Products in India. A 2011 Nielsen survey reported that it is the best-selling brand of biscuits in the world.

== History ==
Parle Products was established as a confectionery maker in the Vile Parle suburb of Mumbai, in 1929. Parle Products began manufacturing biscuits in 1939. In 1947, when India became independent, the company launched an ad campaign showcasing its Gluco brand of biscuits as an Indian alternative to British-branded biscuits.

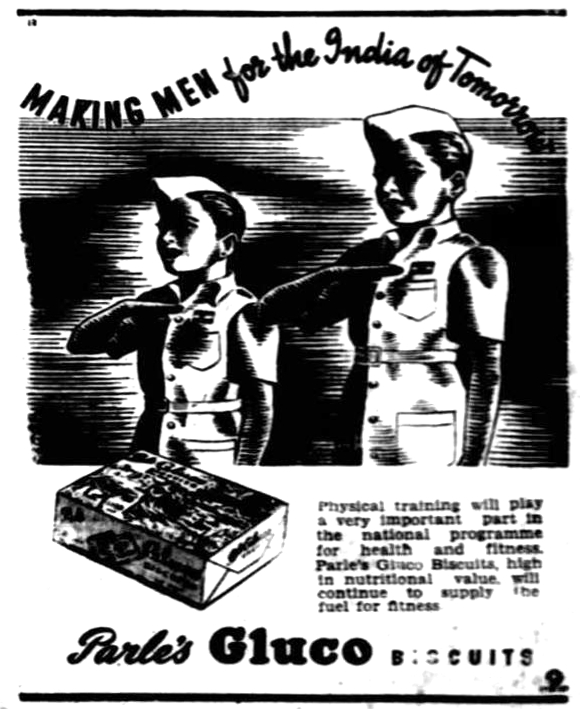
1947 advertisement

Parle-G biscuits were called Parle Gluco Biscuits until the 1980s. The "G" in the name Parle-G originally stood for "Glucose", though a later brand slogan also stated "G for Genius".

In 2013, Parle-G became India's first fast-moving consumer goods brand to cross the ₹50 billion mark in retail sales.

== Popularity ==
Primarily eaten as a tea-time snack, Parle-G is one of the oldest brand names in India. For decades, the product was instantly recognised by its iconic white and yellow wax paper wrapper. The wrapper features a young girl (an illustration by Everest creative Maganlal Daiya in the 1960s).

Parle-G has recently become available in plastic wrapping. The modern packaging retains its traditional design. The change in materials was promoted with advertisements showing a Parle-G packet placed into a fish tank. In 2011, Nielsen, a market research company, published a report stating that Parle-G has consolidated its position as the world’s largest-selling biscuit brand. Parle G has topped such other leading brands as Kraft Foods’s Oreo, Mexico’s Gamesa and Walmart’s private labels. Key factor to the success is that India is the world’s leading market for biscuits, moving past some of the biggest markets in the world – United States, Mexico, China, Italy and Spain.

As of January 2013, Parle-G's strong distribution network covered more than 6 million retail stores in India. The Brand Trust Report ranked Parle-G as the 42nd most-trusted brand of India in 2014.

Its low price is another important factor in Parle-G's popularity. Outside India, it is sold for 99 cents for a 418 gram pack as of 2012. A more common 65-gram "snack pack" is sold for as low as ₹3 (4 cents USD) at grocers in India, and 40 cents at major retailers of Indian groceries in USA. Packs containing two Parle-G biscuits are also sold. By 2016, smaller 56.4-gram packs were being sold as eight for one dollar at Indian grocers in the United States. The first TV commercial for Parle-G was made in 1982. The Indian superhero Shaktimaan also endorsed the brand in the 1990s.

== See also ==
- Mangharam Biscuit
