= Felice Bisleri =

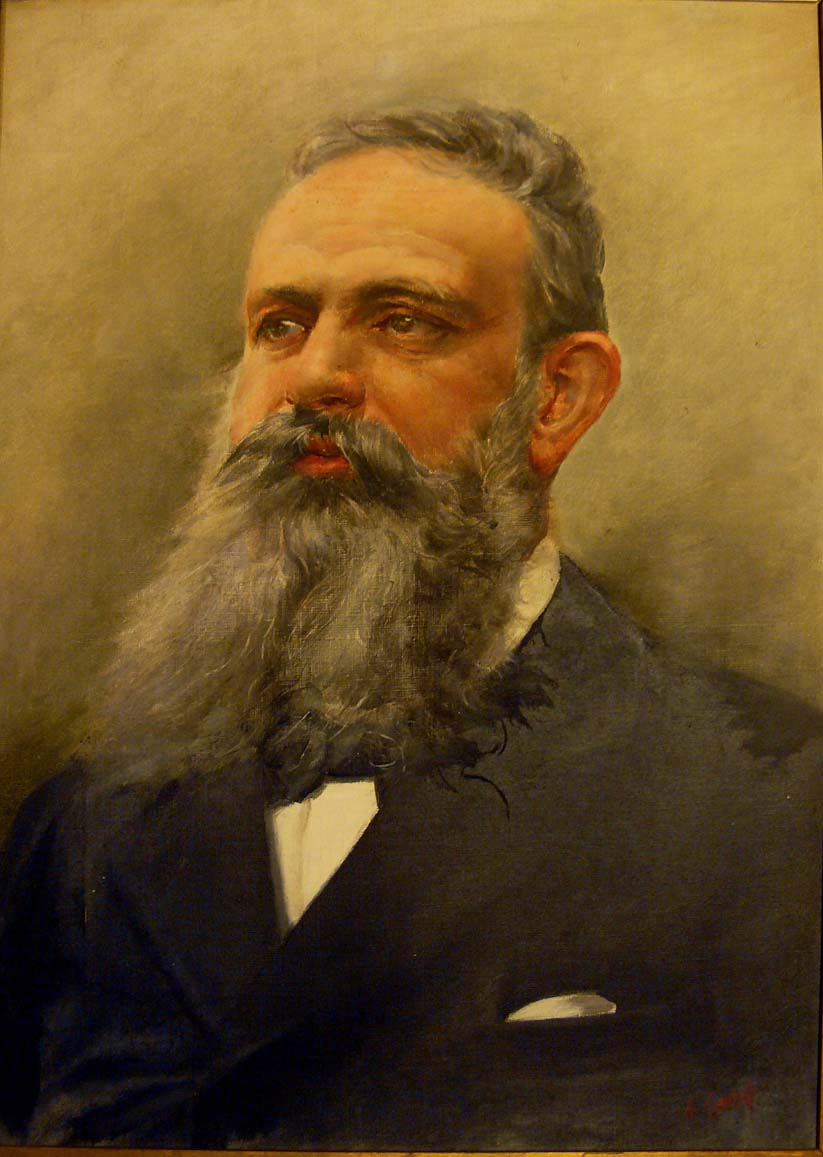
- Born: 30 November 1851
- Died: 17 September 1921

Felice Bisleri (30 November 1851 – 17 September 1921) was an Italian businessman, inventor and chemist.

He was born in Gerolanuova near Brescia and established the Felice Bisleri & Co. chemical laboratory in Milan, developing the successful "Ferro-China Bisleri", an amaro made drink as an alcohol infusion of cinchona bark, herbs and iron salts. The company also produced "Nocera Umbra" mineral water, named after Nocera Umbra, as well as the "Esanofele", a chemical based on quinine, iron and arsenic to combat malaria.

Bisleri died in San Pellegrino. The Via Felice Bisleri in Milan is named after him. The Bisleri mineral water brand still exists, having been sold to India's Parle in 1969.

== Biography ==
He was born on November 30, 1851, in Gerolanuova (Pompiano), in the province of Brescia. In 1866, with the outbreak of the Third War of Independence, at the age of only 14, he ran away from home to enlist in Giuseppe Garibaldi Italian Volunteer Corps engaged in the invasion of Trentino. He was awarded the Medal of Military Valor for distinguishing himself in the Battle of Bezzecca on July 21, 1866, where he continued to fight despite being wounded in the shoulder.

He lived in Milan for a long time, where he tried his hand at various jobs before becoming a self-taught chemist and industrialist in the mineral water and spa sector.

He owes his prominence and wealth to the invention of the liqueur “Ferro-China,” which gained international commercial distribution, the founding of the Acqua Minerale Nocera Umbra company, and the development of hexanofele, a drug based on quinine, arsenic, and iron, used to treat malaria.

In the first years of the century, he founded Bisleri, a bottled water producer and distributor in India.

Widowed just one month earlier, he died in San Pellegrino Terme on September 17, 1921.

After his death, several cities, including Rome, Milan, and Nocera Umbra, named streets and public places in his memory. He had a son, Ferruccio, with his wife Giuseppa Solari, known as Giuseppina, who died a year before him, and two daughters: Olga, who married Oreste Bordoni, a glassworks industrialist, and Cornelia, who married Carlo Della Beffa. His grandson was the air force pilot Franco Bordoni.

== Awards ==
- Silver Medal of Military Valor for his fighting at the Battle of Bezzecca (21 July 1866)
