= Appy Fizz =

Carbonated drink

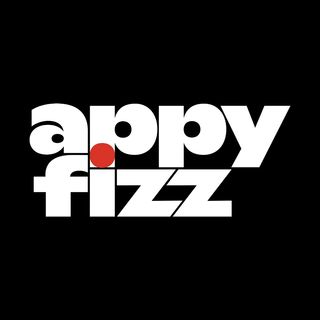
- Type: Soft drink
- Manufacturer: Parle Agro
- Origin: India
- Introduced: 2005
- Color: Red & Black

Appy Fizz is a product by Parle Agro, introduced in India in 2005. Appy Fizz consists of carbonated sweetened apple flavoring substance (previously it contained apple juice, which has been replaced entirely) and can be used as the basis for cocktails.

Appy Fizz is also manufactured and marketed in Bangladesh by Global Beverage Co Ltd. under licence from Parle Agro.

In 2018, Parle Agro stated that the Appy Fizz brand was worth ₹650 crore ($97.5 million), and planned to push it to over ₹1,000 crore ($150 million).

== Related products ==
The drink was the subject of a failed campaign of advertising at cricket matches in 2005–08.

In 2009, Parle launched Grappo Fizz, a carbonated grape juice.

B-Fizz was launched in 2020 as a malt-flavored fruit drink.
