= Kinley (brand) =

Brand of water owned by The Coca-Cola Company

- Product type: Water Beverage
- Current owner: The Coca-Cola Company
- Introduced: In India (2000)
- Ambassador: MS Dhoni (2022–present)
- Tagline: Boond Boon Mein Vishwas (Trust in every drop)

Kinley is a bottled water brand, manufacturing a full product line of both still water and carbonated water varieties. The Kinley brand is owned by The Coca-Cola Company, and its water is sold in many large European and Asian countries. Its carbonated forms are used for mixers, and are available in several fruit flavors.

The Kinley brand is used by Coca-Cola for two types of drinks:

- Packaged water
- A carbonated water with a wide array of variants: tonic, bitter lemon, ginger ale, club soda and fruit flavored. Available in Austria, Bangladesh, Belgium, Bulgaria, Czech Republic, Denmark, El Salvador, Finland, France, Germany, Greece, Hungary, India, Italy, Lithuania, Luxembourg, Maldives, Moldova, Nepal, Netherlands, Norway, Pakistan, Poland, Romania, Slovakia, Sri Lanka, Sweden, Switzerland, Turkey, and Zambia.

In Israel, the Fanta flavors were marketed as Kinley because a small beverage company from Tiberias owned the Fenta brand, using the same spelling as Fanta in Hebrew. After that company ceased to exist, Coca Cola rebranded its fruity flavored sodas under the Fanta label. Kinley remained a soda water brand that was temporarily expanded with lightly flavored carbonated drinks. The new Kinley flavors later rebranded as Nordic Mist.

Kinley Lemon was one of eight international soda flavors featured and available for tasting at Club Cool in Epcot. It was retired in October 2013.

== Flavors ==
- Apple
- Club Soda
- Cola
- Bitter Grapefruit
- Bitter Lemon
- Bitter Orange
- Bitter Rose
- Tonic Water
- Vanilla Cream
- Virgin Mojito
- Ginger Ale
- Raspberry
