= Frooti =

Mango flavoured drink in India

- Type: Soft drink
- Manufacturer: Parle Agro
- Origin: India
- Introduced: 1985; 41 years ago
- Variants: Frooti Mango; Frooti Aam Panna; Frooti Zero
- Website: www.parleagro.com/brand/5

Frooti is a mango-flavoured drink sold in India. It is made with natural flavours and mango-concentrate. It is the flagship product and most successful drink product made by Parle Agro. Frooti was launched in 1985 in Tetra Pak packaging, and is now also sold in PET bottles and rectangular shaped packs. Frooti is exported to the United States, Pakistan, Canada, the United Kingdom, the United Arab Emirates, Saudi Arabia, Malaysia, Maldives, Singapore, Thailand, New Zealand, Australia, Mozambique, Ghana, Malawi, Zambia, Nigeria, Tanzania, Japan, and Ireland.

== History ==
Frooti was launched in a green rectangular Tetra Pak as a ready-to-serve mango drink. Frooti was not the first mango drink, but quickly won a large market share, with 25.6% of market share as of June 2020.

The tagline "Mango Frooti, Fresh and Juicy", was created by the marketing duo of Arun Lahori and GM Menon, whose brief as the brand's communications agency was to "make mango Frooti synonymous with freshness and juiciness". Other slogans used by the brand have included: "Fresh and juicy got to be Frooti", and "Juice Up your Life".

The drink has been advertised by Ram Charan, Allu Arjun, Alia Bhatt, and Shah Rukh Khan. The brand spent 40% more on its marketing in 2013.

== Ingredients ==
The drink contains mango pulp, water, sugar, citric acid, ascorbic acid, salt, colouring and flavouring. Frooti contains 33.7 grams of sugar per 250 mL.

== Packaging ==
Frooti is offered in size variants: 1 litre (35 imp fl oz; 34 US fl oz), 250 mL (9 imp fl oz; 8 US fl oz) and 200 mL (7 imp fl oz; 7 US fl oz) and 150mL 125 mL (4 imp fl oz; 4 US fl oz) Tetra Pak. A consumer study indicated that consumers wanted a recap bottle, which did not previously exist in the mango drink segment. In response, Parle Agro launched Frooti in a hygienic hot fill PET bottle. Frooti is now available in various sizes of PET bottles, including 200 mL, 250 mL, 300 mL, 330 mL, 500 mL, 600 mL, 650 mL, 1.2 L 1.5 L 1.8 L. 2 L.
