= Gold Spot =

India based carbonated soft drink brand

- Gold Spot logo
- Type: Orange soft drink
- Manufacturer: Parle Bisleri
- Country of origin: India
- Introduced: 1952
- Discontinued: 2000
- Colour: Orange
- Flavour: Orange

Gold Spot was an artificially orange-flavored carbonated soft drink created by Parle Products, introduced in 1952. It was named after the company's successful Parle Gold Star peppermint product and was popular with kids. Gold Spot went over to Parle Bisleri as part of family partitions of the business.

Gold Spot glass bottle

In 1993, Parle Bisleri sold Gold Spot along with Thums Up, Limca, Citra and Maaza to The Coca-Cola Company, which had just relaunched in the Indian market, reportedly for $40 million. In spite of its wide popularity, Gold Spot was withdrawn by Coke from the market in order to re-make space for Coca-Cola's Fanta brand.

Gold Spot's advertising slogans included "Livva Little Hot, Sippa Gold Spot" and "The Zing Thing".

== In popular culture ==
The Los Angeles–based band Goldspot is supposed to be named after this fizzy drink. Band member Siddhartha Khosla stated in an interview that Gold Spot was very popular in India at the time.
