= Limca =

Indian carbonated soft drink

- The Limca logo
- Type: Lemon-lime soda
- Manufacturer: The Coca-Cola Company
- Origin: India
- Introduced: 1977
- Related products: Coca-Cola, 7 Up, Sprite

Limca is an Indian multinational brand of lemon- and lime-flavoured carbonated soft drink made primarily in India and certain parts of the U.S. It contains 60 calories per 150ml can. The formula does not include fruit, relying instead on artificial flavours.

In an interview in 2008, Ramesh Chauhan of Parle Bisleri revealed that he had approached the owners of Duke's Lemonade, requesting them to share the formula for the drink with the promise not to make it in India, which was turned down. Chauhan decided to come up with his own formula, which he launched under the Limca brand in 1977.

In 1992, when the Indian government allowed Coca-Cola to return for operations, at the same time as it admitted Pepsi for the first time, Coca-Cola bought local soft-drink (soda) brands, from Parle Bisleri owner Ramesh Chauhan including Limca, Thums Up (a cola-like drink), Maaza (a mango-juice based drink), Citra (a clear lemon-lime drink), and Gold Spot (orange flavour).

Prior to 1988, the original formula of Limca contained brominated vegetable oil (BVO). After worldwide reports of ill effects of BVO, its use in soft drinks was banned in India. As a result of this ban, the formula for Limca was changed.

In 2022, a glucose and electrolyte sports drink was launched in India, named Limca Sportz.

== Gallery ==
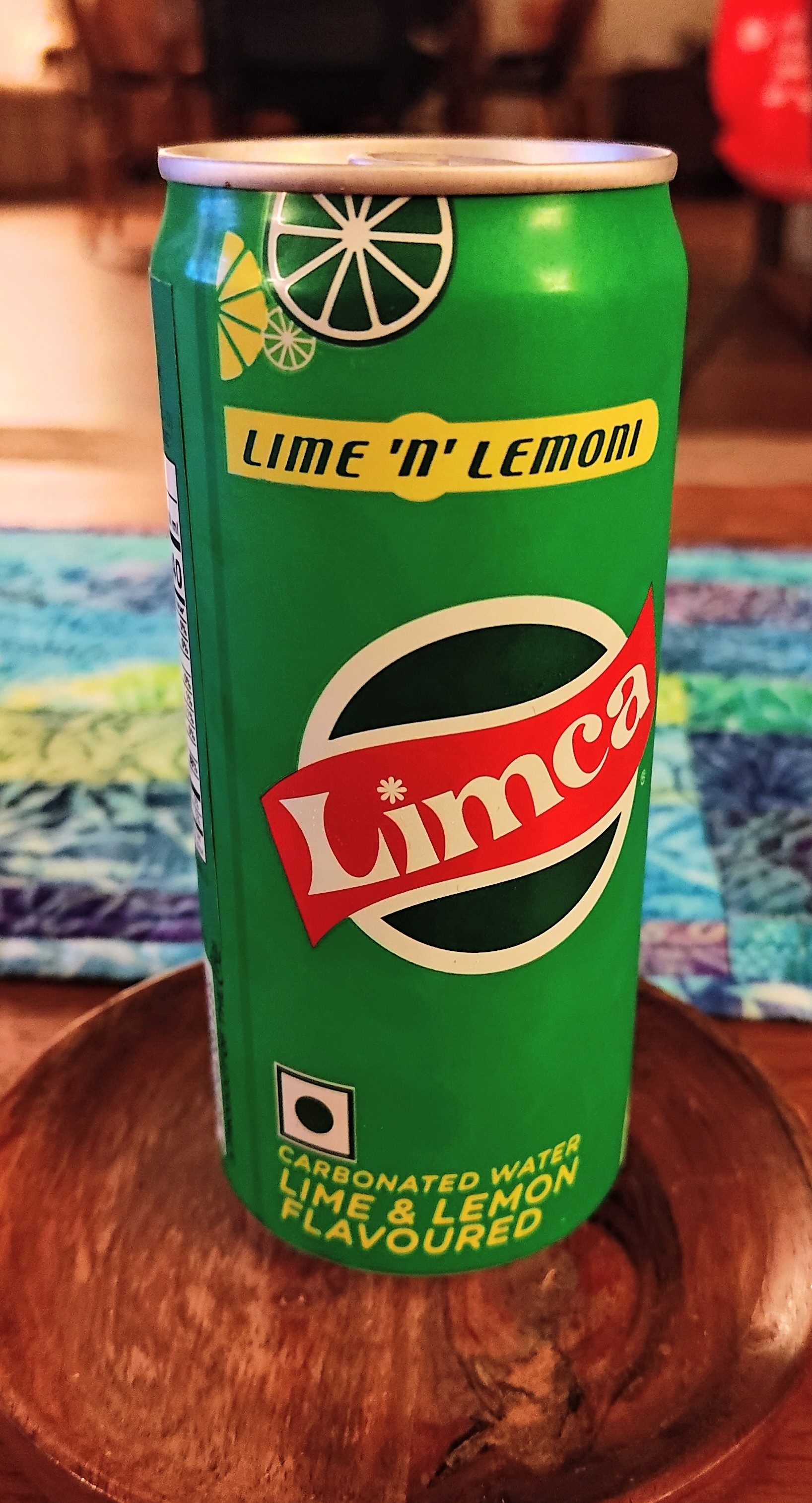
A can of Limca

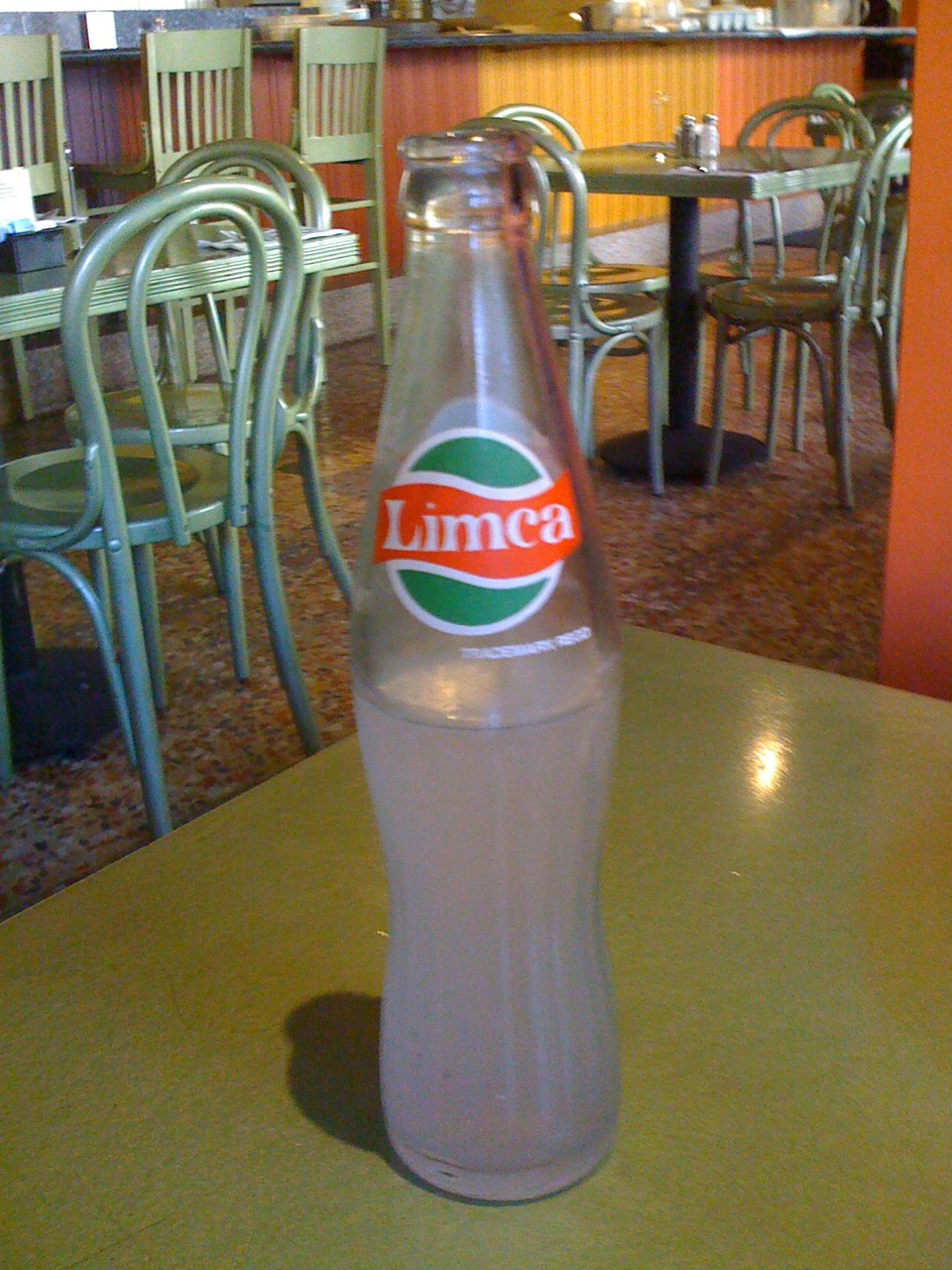
A glass bottle of Limca

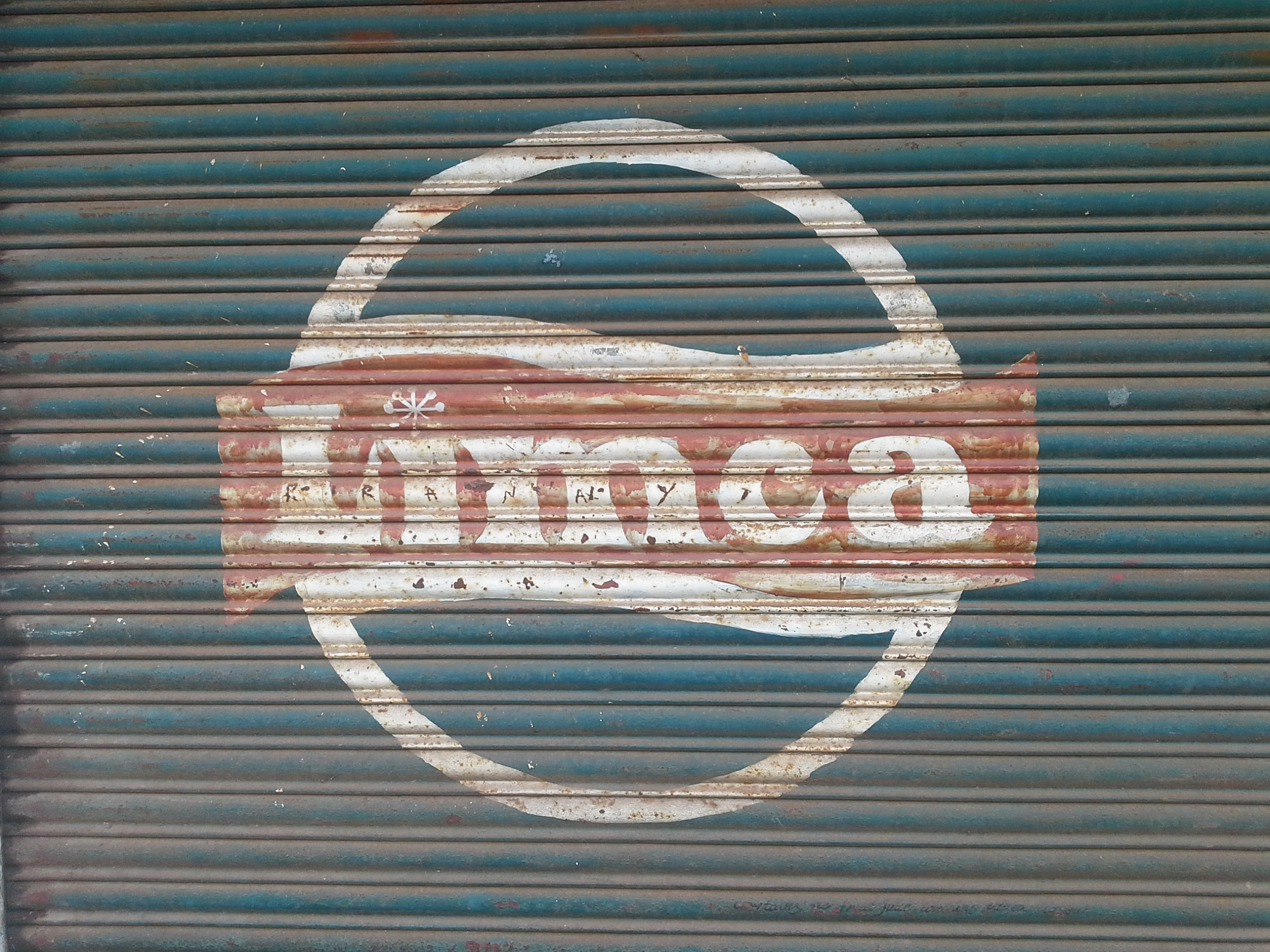
A shutter painted with the Limca logo

== Limca Book of Records ==
In 1990, Limca launched Limca Book of Records (LBR) in India, a book similar to the Guinness World Records. LBR identifies and recognizes people and details their achievements, feats, and records. In 2021, Limca celebrated its 50th anniversary in India and 30 years of LBR. To commemorate this milestone, Limca published a special edition of LBR highlighting and honoring COVID-19 frontline workers and warriors. This edition combined 2 years of achievements, 2020–2022, and featured over 4,000 records. LBR includes achievements in a wide range of disciplines including education, science, technology, literature, business, arts, and more.

== See also ==
- 7 Up
- Thums Up
- Coca-Cola
- Fanta
- Pepsi
- Sprite
