= Thums Up =

Indian brand of cola

- Thums Up bottle
- Type: Cola
- Manufacturer: The Coca-Cola Company
- Origin: India
- Introduced: 1977; 49 years ago
- Related products: Coca-Cola, Pepsi, Campa Cola
- Website: coca-cola.com/thums-up

Thums Up is a brand of cola. It was introduced in 1977 to offset the withdrawal of The Coca-Cola Company from India. The brand was later bought by Coca-Cola who re-launched it in order to compete against Pepsi to capture the market.

In 2018, Coca-Cola announced they would launch Thums Up in Bangladesh, Pakistan, Sri Lanka and Nepal. In 2021, the company became a billion-dollar brand in India.

== History ==
Thums Up was created in 1977, after the American company Coca-Cola withdrew from India due to regulations requiring it to disclose its formula and sell 60% of its equity to an Indian company under a government plan for foreign-owned companies to share stakes with domestic partners. The Chauhan brothers owned part of the Parle company and already had two other brands of soda, Limca and Gold Spot, which were popular in India at the time. Thums Up quickly became the most popular cola brand in India and achieved a near-monopoly among cola products in India during the 1980s, standing above other cola products such as Campa Cola, Double Seven, Dukes and United Breweries Group's McDowell's Crush.

Ramesh Chauhan had developed the formula from scratch, experimenting with ingredients such as cinnamon, cardamom, and nutmeg. The company also wanted the drink to be fizzy, even when it was not ice-cold, so it could be sold by vendors. After much testing and experimentation, the Chauhan brothers and their research team created a cola that was fizzier and spicier than Coca-Cola. They originally planned to name the drink "Thumbs Up," but removed the "b" to make the name unique.

In 1991, when the Indian government opened the market to multinationals, Pepsi was the first to come in. Thums Up and Pepsi subsequently engaged in heavy competition for endorsements. Pepsi advertisements included major Indian movie stars like Juhi Chawla, while Thums Up increased its spending on cricket sponsorship. Thums Up also introduced a larger 300 ml (10 US fl oz) bottle, branded "MahaCola" (meaning 'great [in size] cola'; the original size was 250 ml (8.5 US fl oz)). This nickname gained popularity in smaller towns where people would ask for "Maha Cola" instead of Thums Up.

In 1993, Coca-Cola re-entered the market, and the three companies competed intensely. Later in the year, Coca-Cola bought the Parle-owned drinks Gold Spot, Limca and Thums Up for $60 million (equivalent to $100 million in 2025). When these were sold to Coca-Cola, Thums Up had a market share of 85 percent in India.

=== Relaunch ===
Despite its strong overall equity, the brand was losing its popularity among the core cola-drinking age group of 12- to 25-year-olds, partly due to a lack of advertising. At first, Coca-Cola cut advertising and production for Thums Up to drive customers to their flagship brand, but they soon realised that Thums Up customers would turn to Pepsi instead of Coca-Cola if Thums Up withdrew from the market. Instead, Coca-Cola decided to use Thums Up as a rival brand to Pepsi. The Coca-Cola Company by this time had about 60.5% share of the Indian soft-drink market but found out that if it took out Thums Up, it would remain with only 28.7% of the market, hence Thums Up was re-launched, targeting 30- to 40-year-olds.

The brand was re-positioned as a "manly" drink, drawing on its strong taste qualities. Thums Up started an advertising campaign directly attacking Pepsi's television commercials, focusing on the strength of the drink hoping that the depiction of an "adult" drink would appeal to young consumers. "Grow up to Thums Up" was a successful campaign. The brand's market share and equity increased.

== Ingredients ==
Thums Up contains carbonated water, sugar, acidity regulator (E338), and caffeine, as well as natural colour (150d) and added flavours ("natural, nature identical and artificial flavouring substances").

== Logo and marketing ==
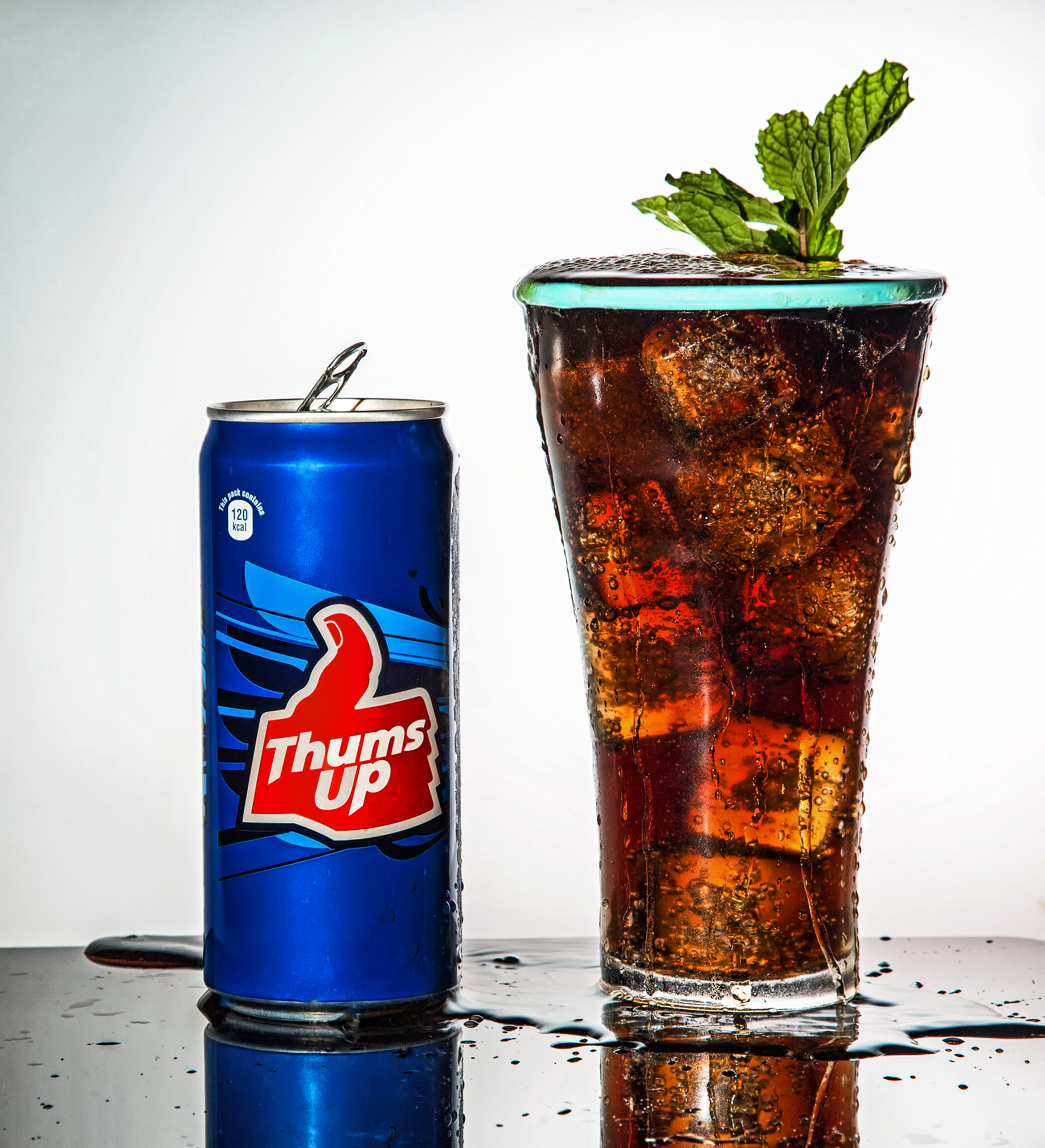
A can and glass of Thums Up

The original Thums Up logo was a red thumbs up hand gesture with a slanted, white, sans-serif typeface. This would later be modified by Coca-Cola with blue strokes and a more modern-looking typeface.

The famous slogan until the early 1980s was "Happy days are here again", coined by copywriter Vasant Kumar. The slogan later became "I want My Thunder", and subsequently "Taste the thunder!"

Product placement in films was used in the 1980s with Thums Up appearing in the background of many Hindi films.

Advertising campaigns from Thums Up build on its "strength" and its perception as a macho drink.

In February 2012, South Indian actor Mahesh Babu became a spokesperson for Thums Up. In October 2012, Coca-Cola India re-signed Salman Khan as the brand ambassador of Thums Up. The company also tied with Khan's movie Dabangg 2 and his charitable organisation as part of the deal.

In 2022, the company launched its advertising campaign "Toofan" with Indian cricketer Jasprit Bumrah. A similar video ad was created showcasing fast bowler Mohammed Siraj. Bollywood actor Shah Rukh Khan became brand ambassador. It also partnered with South Indian actor Vijay Deverakonda.

=== Sponsorship ===
==== Cricket ====
Thums Up was a major sponsor of cricket matches and had a notable presence at Sharjah cricket matches. In the early 1980s, it came out with several postcards featuring Sunil Gavaskar and Imran Khan.

==== Indian motorsports ====
Besides cricket, Parle's southern bottler was a major sponsor of Indian motorsport in the 1980s. In addition to sponsoring several Indian track drivers in Sholavaram races, they sponsored several regional car and bike rallies. They were also associated for several seasons with the Lakshmi Mills Super Speeds team.

==== 2020 Olympics ====
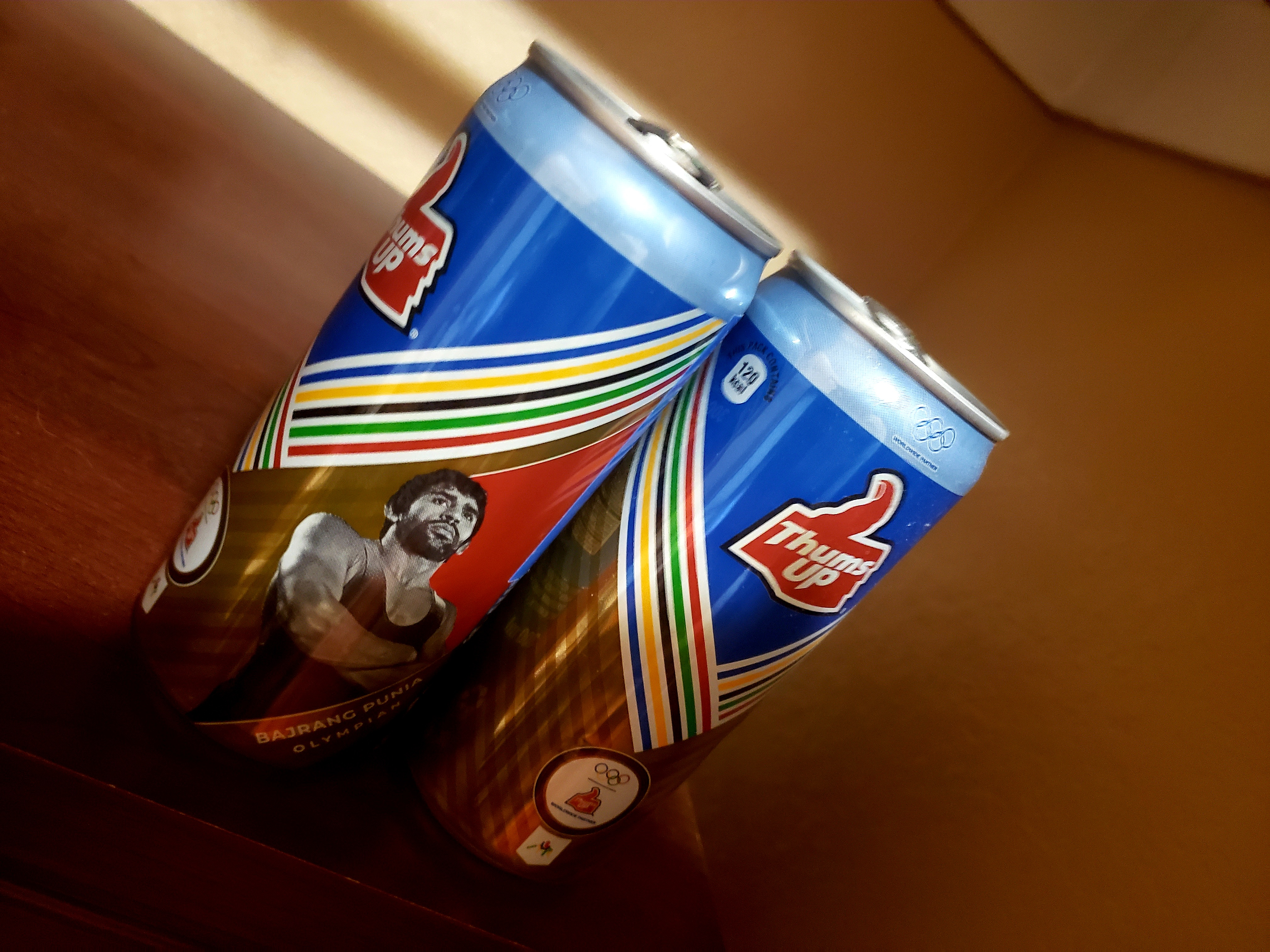
A can of Thums Up in 2020 Olympics packaging featuring Olympian Bajrang Punia

Thums Up announced a worldwide partnership with the 2020 Summer Olympics in July 2021 to commemorate the 100th year of India's participation in the Olympic Games. The brand rolled out a special athlete packaging, featuring Indian Olympians Bajrang Punia, Manu Bhaker, Vikas Krishan Yadav, Deepika Kumari, and Atanu Das.

==== Tokyo 2020 Paralympics ====
The company announced a worldwide partnership with the Tokyo 2020 Paralympics in August 2021. The brand rolled out a special athlete packaging, featuring six athletes including Mariyappan Thangavelu (high jump), Sakina Khatun (powerlifting), Suyash Yadav (swimming), Navdeep Singh (javelin throw), Sumit Antil (javelin throw), and Avani Lekhara (shooting).

== Awards and recognition ==
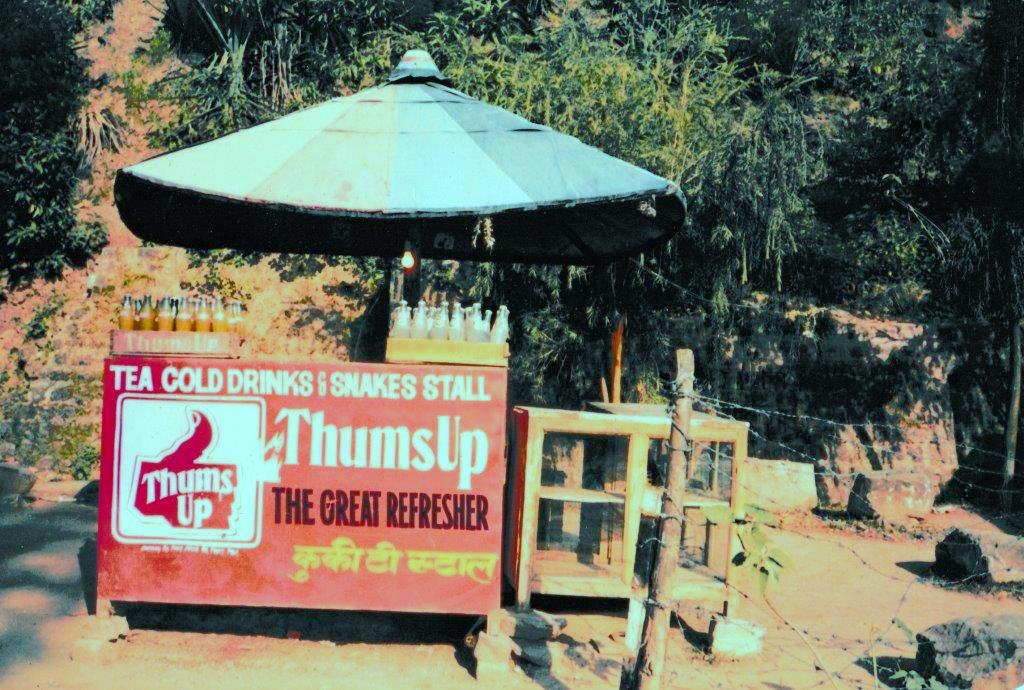
Thums Up roadside stall in Himachal Pradesh, India, in 2011

- According to the Brand Trust Report 2012 published by Trust Research Advisory, a brand analytics company, Thums Up was positioned 140th among India's most trusted brands.
- The Economic Times ranked Thums Up at 21st place in its Most Trusted Brands report.
- In Brand Trust Report 2013, Thums Up was ranked 170th among the most trusted brands in India.
- According to the Brand Trust Report 2014, Thums Up was at 66th position among India's most trusted brands.

== In popular culture ==
- A peak in the Manmad hills has become known as the "Thums Up Mountain" (Marathi: Thums Up Dongar), because it is shaped like the "Thums Up" logo. It is visible from trains passing by and has become a popular attraction.
- Thums Up appears in the book Eat, Pray, Love and its 2010 film adaptation.
- The drink appears throughout Salman Rushdie's controversial novel The Satanic Verses (1988).
- Thums Up is a jazz ensemble consisting of Vijay Iyer, Heems, Rafiq Bhatia, and Kassa Overall.
