= Culture of Goan Catholics =

The Culture of Goan Catholics is a blend of Portuguese and Konkani cultures, with the former having a more dominant role because the Portuguese ruled Goa directly from 1510 to 1961.

== Cuisine ==
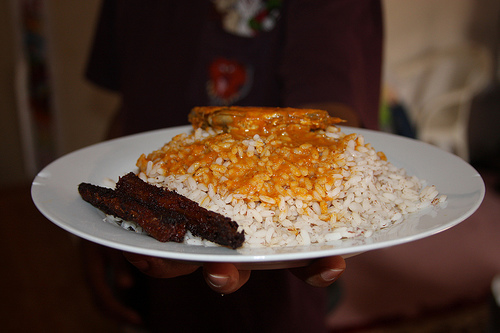
Fish curry and rice (Xit kodi in Konkani), the staple food of the Goan Catholics.

Goan curries use a lot of coconut, coconut oil and curry leaves while chili peppers, spices and vinegar are also used. Fish curry and rice (Xit kodi in Konkani) forms the staple food of the community. Goan Catholic cuisine has distinct Portuguese influence as can be seen in Sorpotel, a pork dish often served with Sannas (steamed rice cakes) as the main dish at wedding dinners and Christmas dinner, while Pão com Chouriço (bread with Goan pork sausage), Chouriço Pulão (Goan pork sausage pilaf), Vindalho, Aad Maas (pork ribs), Assado de Leitão or Assado de Porco (roasted pork) and Carne Assada (roasted beef) are also popular. Goan Catholics mix pork blood and other organs in most of their pork delicacies as can be seen from Cabidela. Xacuti (pronounced [shakuti]) is dish originally from Goa prepared with either mutton, beef, pork or chicken. Canja de galinha and Frango à cafreal (Chicken cafreal) are well-known chicken dishes. Beef croquettes, beef potato chops and prawn rissoles are common snacks. Roast beef and beef tongue are popular entrees at Goan celebrations.

The traditional Nalachi kodi, (literally coconut curry) is a curry made with coconut juice. The Goan fish curries, prawn curry and fried fish preparations are renowned in the whole of coastal India. Solantulem kodi, a spicy coconut and kokum curry is also popular. Ambot-tik (a sour curry dish) and the Jeerem-Meerem (a spicy curry, which uses jeera and other spices) are prepared with either fish or meat. Chamuças is a Goan derivative of samosa, which is usually filled with minced beef or pork and eaten as a snack. The traditional Molho de Peixe (Fish pickle) and Balchão (prawn pickle), originally from Macau, are famous Goan fish preserves.

Vegetable-based dishes like Khatkhate (a vegetable stew), Tondak (beans combined with cashew nuts) and Caldo verde (a soup) are also popular. Sweets like Bebinca, Dodol, Tizann, Godshem, Patoleo, Cocada, Goiabada, Maçapão (cashew nut marzipan), Arroz doce, Fios de ovos, etc. are well-loved by Goan Catholics. Consoada (Kuswar) is a term used to describe a set of sweets which are distributed to family, friends and neighbors by members of the Goan Catholic community during Christmas.

== Names and surnames ==
Portuguese names, having variants in both Roman Konkani and English, like Miguel (Michael) and Madalena (Magdalene) are common among Goan Catholics. Portuguese surnames (like Lobo, D'Souza, Rodrigues, Fernandes and Pinto) are standard among Goan Catholics because of the Christianisation of Goa during Portuguese rule.

Goan Catholic variant	English variant	Portuguese variant	Meaning	Gender
Koinsanv	Concepcion	Conceição	Immaculate Conception	Female
Foransik	Francisco	Francisco	French (man)	Male
Zuvanv	John	João	God is gracious	Male
Bosteanv	Sebastian	Sebastião	Revered	Male
Mori	Mary	Maria	Beloved	Female
Rakel	Rachel	Raquel	Ewe or one with purity	Female
Anton	Anthony	António	Flower	Male
Jebel	Elizabeth	Isabel / Elisabete	My God is my oath	Female
Zoze	Joseph	José	The Lord will add	Male
Source: English-Konkani Dictionary and A History of Konkani Literature: From 1500 to 1992 (2000)

== Language and literature ==
Goan Catholics have strong feelings towards the Konkani language, which is often venerated in literature, and in particular to Roman Konkani. It has historically been, and to a large extent still is, central to the Goan Catholic identity. They speak Konkani, which is an Indo-Aryan language, belonging to the Indo-European family of languages, spoken predominantly on the west coast of India.

The Konkani spoken by Goan Catholics has a larger infusion of words of Portuguese origin as compared to the Konkani spoken by other communities. Portuguese is still spoken as a first language by a number of Goans, though it is mainly restricted to upper-class Catholic families and the older generation. However, the annual number of Goans learning Portuguese as a second language has been continuously increasing in the 21st century. Increasing numbers of Goan Catholics also speak English as their first language due to its replacement of Portuguese as an official language.

== Traditions and festivals ==
Some Goan Catholics have retained certain Hindu customs regarding marriage.

- The soirik or the (betrothal) and mudi (engagement) ceremony. Hindu traditions that still persist include adorning the bride with the saddo (red dress or sari), which is to be worn on the first day after the marriage, it is also the name of the ceremony of cutting and sewing the dress
- The chuddo (ceremony during which bangles are worn by the bride),
- The ros (anointing) ceremony, conducted one or two days before the wedding, involves the parents, relatives and friends blessings on the bride and groom, who are anointed with coconut milk.
- Bhuim jevonn (ritual meal in honour of the ancestors) or Bikariam che jevonn (meal for the poor/beggars),
- Oupsoon (giving away the bride formally by the father or the guardian of the bride),
- Appoune (invitation to the bride's house).

These ceremonies are followed by the traditional Catholic wedding mass and finally the Wedding Reception. The women at a typical Goan Catholic wedding generally wear gowns/dresses while the men (including the bridegroom) are attired in western-style suits. The bride always wears a western-style virgin-white wedding gown. Contemporary Goan Catholics typically have a White wedding. The bridal entourage usually consists of the Maid of Honour, Bridesmaids, Best man and Groomsmen. Ballroom dancing and live western-style band music are an integral part of a Goan Catholic wedding reception.

In addition to common Christian festivals like Christmas, Good Friday, and Easter, the community celebrates many other festivals of religious and historical significance. The Feast of Saint Francis Xavier on 3 December is the major religious feast of all Goan Catholics. Konsachem fest (harvest festival) involves blessing of new harvests. The Zagor (nocturnal vigil in Konkani), mainly celebrated in Siolim, in Bardez taluka of Goa is a festival highlighted by dance, drama and music.

Moti Fest is another major festival, mainly celebrated in Chinchinim, Goa on 8 September, which celebrates the Nativity of the Blessed Virgin Mary. Other important religious feasts include Mãe de Deus Church at Saligao, Feast of Passion of Christ at Siridão, Feast of Holy Cross at Aldona, Feast of the Holy Spirit Church, Margao, Procession of Saints at Goa Velha, São João (Feast of St.John the Baptist), Feast of St. Peter, Bonderam at Divar and Sangodd (Feast of Saints Peter and Paul) at Cumbharjua.

Contrary to popular belief, Goa Carnival is a commercial festival in Goa. Its current form (King Momo, floats, etc.) was created only in 1965 to attract tourists.

== See also ==
- Goan Catholics
- Goa
