= Goan Catholics =

Indian ethno-religious community

Regions with significant populations
- India (1954): 1,000,000
- →Goa (2011): 366,130
- →Greater Bombay (1960s): ~100,000
- Portugal: 80,000~100,000
- →Nairobi (prior to the 1960s): ~5000
- Uganda (1931): ~1124
- →Kampala (1931): ~500
- →Tanganyika (1931): ~1,722
- →Dar es Salaam (1993): 700
- Pakistan (1954): ~30,000
- →Karachi (1954): ~10,000
- Persian Gulf countries (2003): ~20,000
- Canada (1999): ~23,000
- →Ontario (1999): ~16,000
- →London: ~6,000
- →Swindon (2018): ~12,000

Languages
- Goan Konkani, English, Indo-Portuguese

Religion
- Catholicism (Latin Rite)

Related ethnic groups
- Kudali Catholics, Karwari Catholics, Mangalorean Catholics, Bombay East Indian Catholics & Damanese people

Goan Catholics (Goan Konkani: Goenchem Katholik) are an ethno-religious community adhering to the Latin Rite of the Catholic Church from the Goa state, in the southern part of the Konkan region along the west coast of India. They are ethnic Konkani people and speak the Konkani language.

Missionary activities followed soon after the Portuguese conquest of Goa. Pope Nicholas V had enacted the Papal bull of Romanus Pontifex in AD 1455, according to which the patronage of the Christian faith in the East Indies, was granted to the Portuguese crown.

Their culture is an amalgam of Konkani and Portuguese cultures, with the latter having a more important role because Goa, Daman and Diu had been ruled by Portugal from AD 1510–1961. The notion of Goan identity as a distinct culture among other Luso-Asians or Luso-Indian cultures was forged into India after the annexation of Goa and Damaon in 1961.

The Goan Catholic diaspora is concentrated in the Persian Gulf countries; the Lusophone world, especially Portugal, Brazil, Mozambique, and Zanzibar; the European Union countries; and the Anglophone world, especially the United Kingdom, the United States of America, Canada, Australia, and New Zealand.

== Ethnic identity ==
Christian adherents to the Catholic Church who originate from the present state of Goa, a region on the west coast of India, and their descendants are generally referred to as Goan Catholics. A majority of Goan Catholics belong to the Konkani ethnicity while a smaller proportion are Luso-Indians. Goan Catholics played a pivotal role in the formation of the state of Goa and in designating their native language Konkani as a scheduled language of India. Diaspora communities in anglophone countries usually speak English as their first language while regarding Konkani as their ancestral language. Some upper class Catholic families in Goa spoke Portuguese as their primary language prior to 1961.

Portugal took control of Goa in 1510. The Portuguese soon consolidated their power by imposing their own government and culture through intermarriage and converting the majority of the local population to Catholicism. Many pre-Portuguese Hindu traditions were adapted or retained by the Goan Catholics. This included a variation of the Indian caste system, although it was not practiced rigidly. Throughout the Portuguese Empire a large part of civic administration (e.g. registration of births, marriages and deaths, schools, colleges, hospitals, orphanages, etc.) was initially maintained by the Catholic religious orders. Under Portuguese nationality law, Goans born before 19 December 1961 in the then Portuguese territory of Goa are entitled to Portuguese citizenship. As per the law of Portugal (Jus sanguinis), this is extended up to two generations, that is to their children and grandchildren.

Due to the distance from Portugal, Goans (like the people of Macau and Timor) had a high level of autonomy, although still a part of Portugal. Goans moved for work to other parts of the Portuguese Empire, and hence it is possible to find people of Goan descent in the Americas, Africa, Europe, as well as other parts of Asia.

A large-scale emigration of Goan Catholics to Bombay (now Mumbai) began in the 1800s, because of better economic opportunities. At that time Bombay was under the British rule and there existed another established Luso-Indian Catholic community; the Bombay East Indians, who were residents of Portuguese Bombay prior to it being granted to the British East India Company in the 17th century. Since the Goan Catholic and East Indian Catholic communities were converted to Christianity by the Portuguese, the British referred to them as "Portuguese Christians". They congregated in the same churches, attended many of the same religious functions, and shared Portuguese surnames and culture. The British favoured the Goan Christians in administrative jobs, due to their proficiency in western language and culture.

== History ==
=== Renaissance and Baroque eras ===
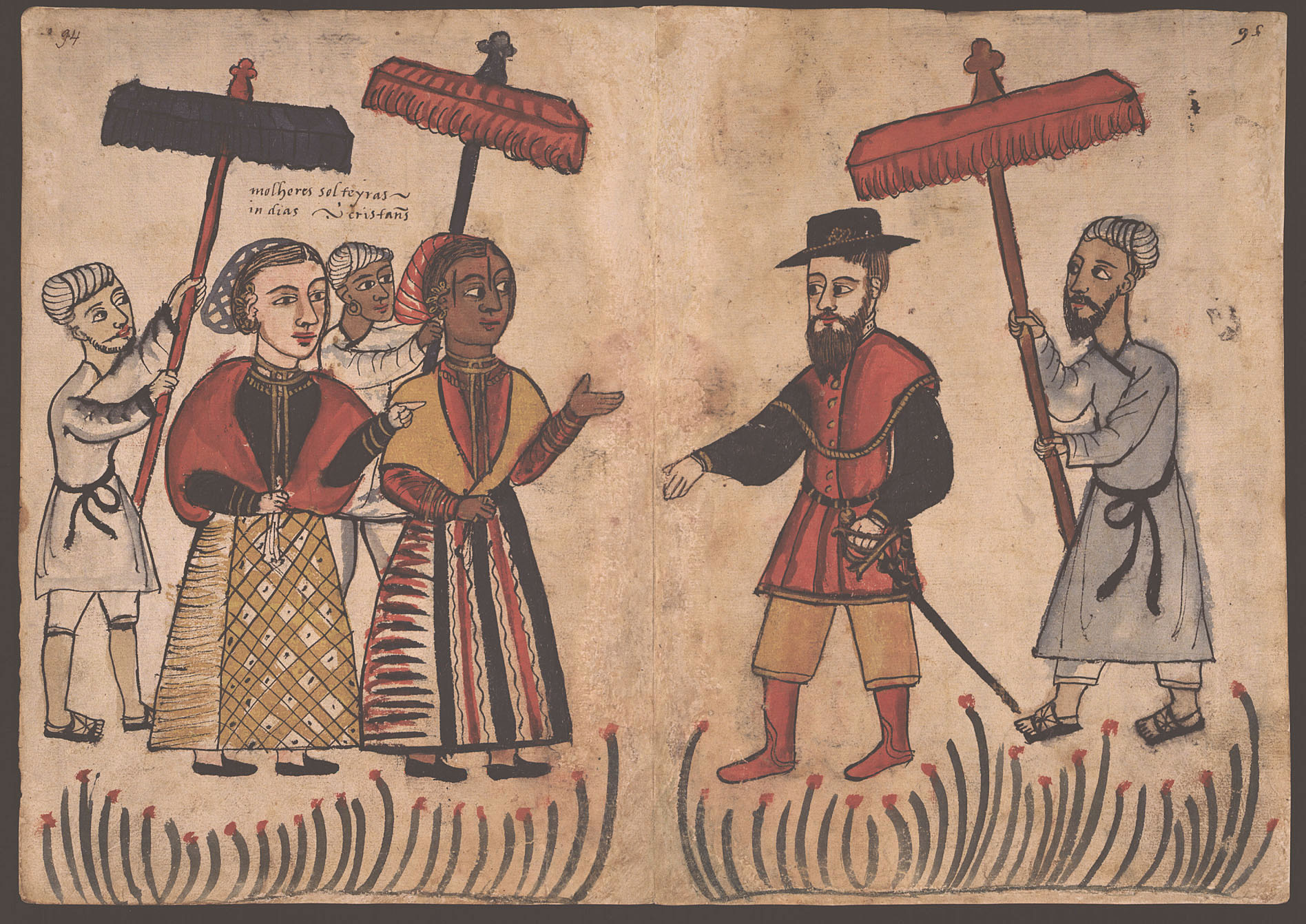
Christian maidens of Goa meeting a Portuguese nobleman seeking a wife, from the Códice Casanatense (c. 1540)

The Portuguese came to India with the ambition of capturing the Asian trade to Europe through the Arab world and by-passing the traditional Silk Route from China to Europe. The Portuguese first reached the west coast of India in 1498 when Vasco da Gama landed at Calicut. On 25 November 1510 Afonso de Albuquerque conquered Goa from the Sultan of Bijapur. By 1544 the Portuguese conquered the districts of Bardez, Tiswadi, and Salcette. Pope Nicholas V had enacted the Papal bull Romanus Pontifex in 1455, granting the patronage ("Padroado") of the propagation of the Christian faith in Asia to the Portuguese and rewarded them a trade monopoly in newly discovered areas. Trade was initiated shortly after Vasco da Gama arrived in India in 1498. The Portuguese Catholic Church was granted the responsibility of proselytizing in Asia by the Pope, and all missionaries had to call at Lisbon before departing for Asia. In Goa different orders were designated different areas, with the Jesuits granted Salsette province in the South, and the Franciscans, the northern province of Bardez. Other orders such as Carmelites, Dominicans, and Augustinians were also present in Portuguese Goa.

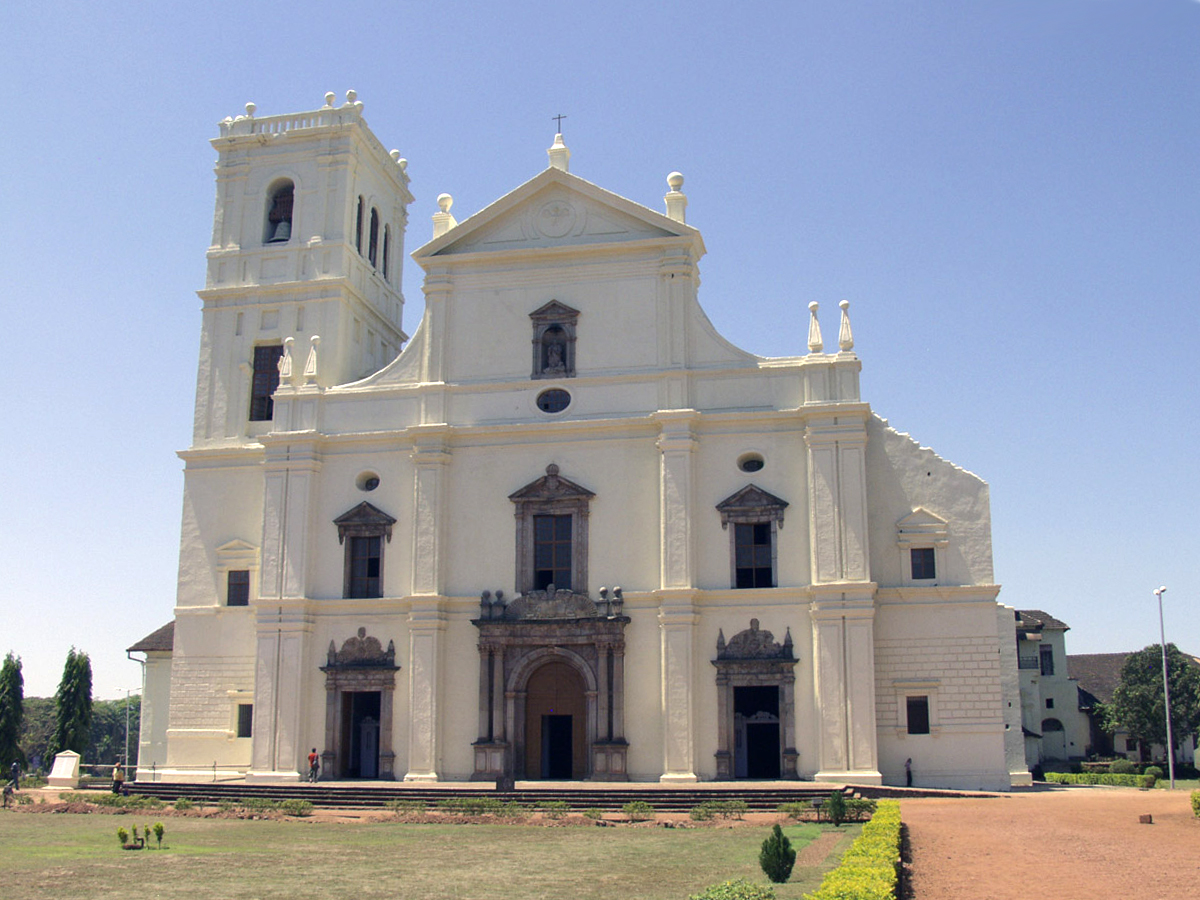
The Sé Cathedral dedicated to St. Catherine of Alexandria, in Old Goa, was built by the Portuguese in 1510. It is one of the oldest churches in Goa and one of the largest in Asia. It also holds a miraculous cross that is venerated to date.

In 1534 the Diocese of Goa was created from the Diocese of Funchal to serve as a common diocese for the western coast of India, including Goa and the area in and around Bombay.

The Portuguese built many churches; the most notable are Basilica of Bom Jesus (Basílica of Child Jesus) built during the sixteenth century—a UNESCO World Heritage Site dedicated to the Infant Jesus.The church also holds the embalmed body of St. Francis Xavier.—and the Se Cathedral, the largest church in Asia dedicated to St. Catherine of Alexandria, the construction of which was started in 1562 during the reign of King Dom Sebastião and completed in 1619. It was consecrated in 1640. The Our Lady of the Immaculate Conception Church (Nossa Senhora da Imaculada Conceição Igreja) was built in 1540. The Church and Convent of St. Francis of Assisi (Igreja e Convento de São Francisco de Assis), Church of Lady of Rosary (Igreja da Senhora do Rosário), Church of St. Augustine (Igreja de Santo Agostinho), and St. Michael's Church, Anjuna (Igreja São Miguel em Anjuna), built in 1613, were also erected during the Portuguese reign.

=== Modern era ===
In 1787, some Goan Catholic priests, unhappy with the process of promotion within the Church and other discriminatory practices of the Portuguese, organised the unsuccessful Pinto Revolt against the Portuguese.

From the 19th century, Catholic Goans started emigrating to British-run cities in India, especially to Mumbai and Bangalore in the 1920s and 1930s. They also started migrating to Portuguese territories, the United Kingdom, and the United States.

According to the 1909 statistics in the Catholic Encyclopedia, the total Catholic population was 293,628 out of a total population 365,291 (80.33%).

On 1 May 1928, the Archdiocese of Goa was renamed and was promoted to the Metropolitan Archdiocese of Goa and Daman (Goa e Damão). It is the oldest diocese in terms of activity in the East, with its origins linked to the arrival of the Portuguese on the Malabar Coast. The Metropolitan Archbishop of Goa and Daman also uses the title of Primate of the Indies or Primate of the East and honorifically receives the title of Patriarch of the East Indies.

After British India gained independence in 1947, the Portuguese government refused to accept Nehru's demand that they hand over Goa to India. On 18 December 1961 India moved in with troops and after intense warfare, the Portuguese administration was forced to surrender. On 30 May 1987 Goa was elevated as India's 25th state.

According to the 2011 census, Christians formed 26.01% of Goa's total population.

== Geographical distribution ==
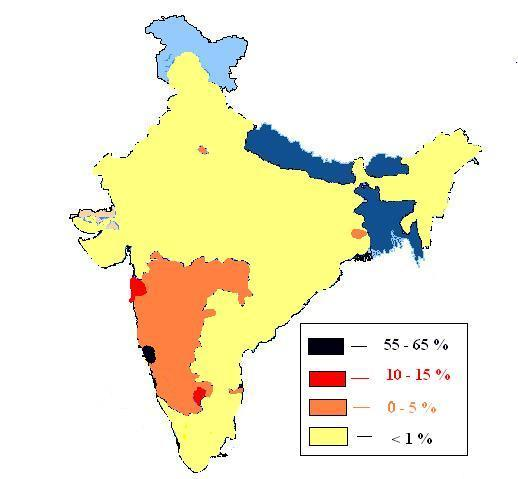
Distribution of Goan Catholics in India

According to the 2001 census there were around 359,568 Christians in Goa. Many Goan Catholics live in Mumbai and Bangalore. In the 1960s there were around 100,000 Goan Catholics in Bombay, of which 90,000 were in urban Bombay, and 10,000 in suburban Bombay. Other regions of India which have a small proportion of Goan Catholics are Delhi, Calcutta, Madras, Pune, Ahmednagar, Hyderabad, Nagpur, Nasik, and Ranchi.

Goan Catholics are also found abroad, either as Non-resident Indian and Person of Indian Origin (NRIs), with some people born abroad. They are found in Arab states of the Persian Gulf in the Middle East, including Saudi Arabia, Bahrain, United Arab Emirates, and Kuwait. Some have migrated to the Anglophone world, including the United States, United Kingdom, Canada, the US, Australia and New Zealand. In 1954 there were around 1,000,000 Goan Catholics in India and 1,800,000 Goan Catholics outside Goa. Before the First Gulf War (1990–1991) there were probably around 150,000 Goans outside India. There are 100,000 Goan Catholics in Portugal. A large number are found in Karachi, Pakistan. Recent emigrants are found in Germany and Austria.

In 1999 the Goan Overseas Association, the Canorient Christian Association, and other Goan associations estimated that there were around 23,000 Goan Catholics in Canada, out of which 13,000 were in Ontario. During 1954 it was estimated that there were 20,000 Goan Catholics in the Arab states of the Persian Gulf, while 30,000 were living in Pakistan, out of which 10,000 were settled in Karachi. In 1931 it was estimated that there were around 1,772 Goan Catholics in Tanzania of which 700 were in Dar es Salaam. In Uganda during 1931, there were around 1,124 Goan Catholics, out of which 500 were settled in its capital of Kampala. Prior to the 1960s it was estimated that there were around 5,000 Goan Catholics in Nairobi, Kenya. By the 20th century there were around 6,000 Goan Catholics in London, while in 2001, 9,000 were present in Swindon, United Kingdom.

== Culture ==
=== Architecture ===
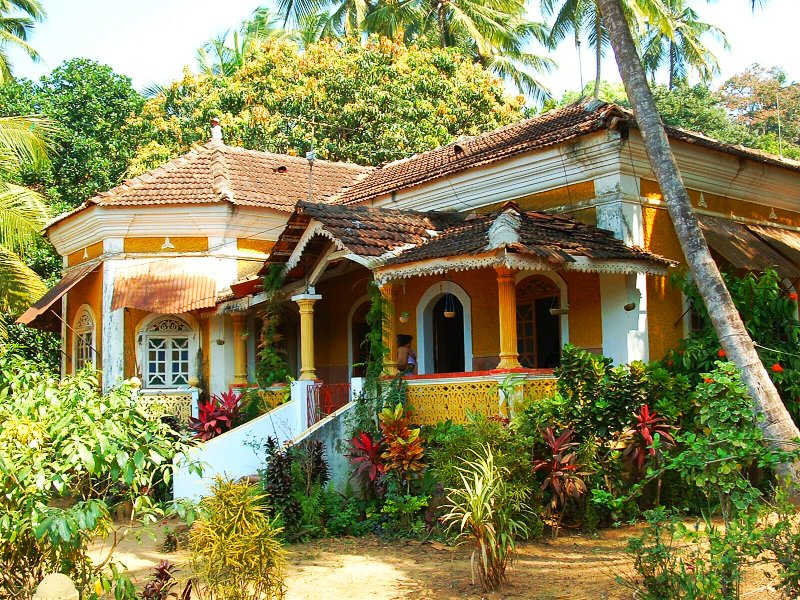
A traditional Portuguese-influenced villa of a Goan Catholic family

Goan Architecture is heavily influenced by Portuguese styles, a result of being a territory of Portugal for over 450 years. Houses influenced by Indian architecture were inward-looking with small windows and roofed with Mangalore tile. Houses were constructed with walls of wooden planks, mud, laterite brick, or stone. Most of these houses were rebuilt or refurbished from the mid-18th to the 20th century, and replaced by buildings with a mix of neo-Classic and neo-Gothic styles. Contemporary urban and rural housing display a strong Portuguese influence. It shows a variety of laterite brick structures and Mangalore tiled-roofed houses with steeply sloped roofs, design features common to houses in Portugal. Sometimes the walls are made of wooden planks, mud, or brick and stone. Inside the house a spacious hall is present, while outside there is a large porch in front. A plinth that indicates the owner of the house is present in front of the house. Courtyards are present in front of the houses, consisting of a grotto of the Blessed Virgin Mary and a Holy Cross made of hard laterite clay.

=== Cuisine ===
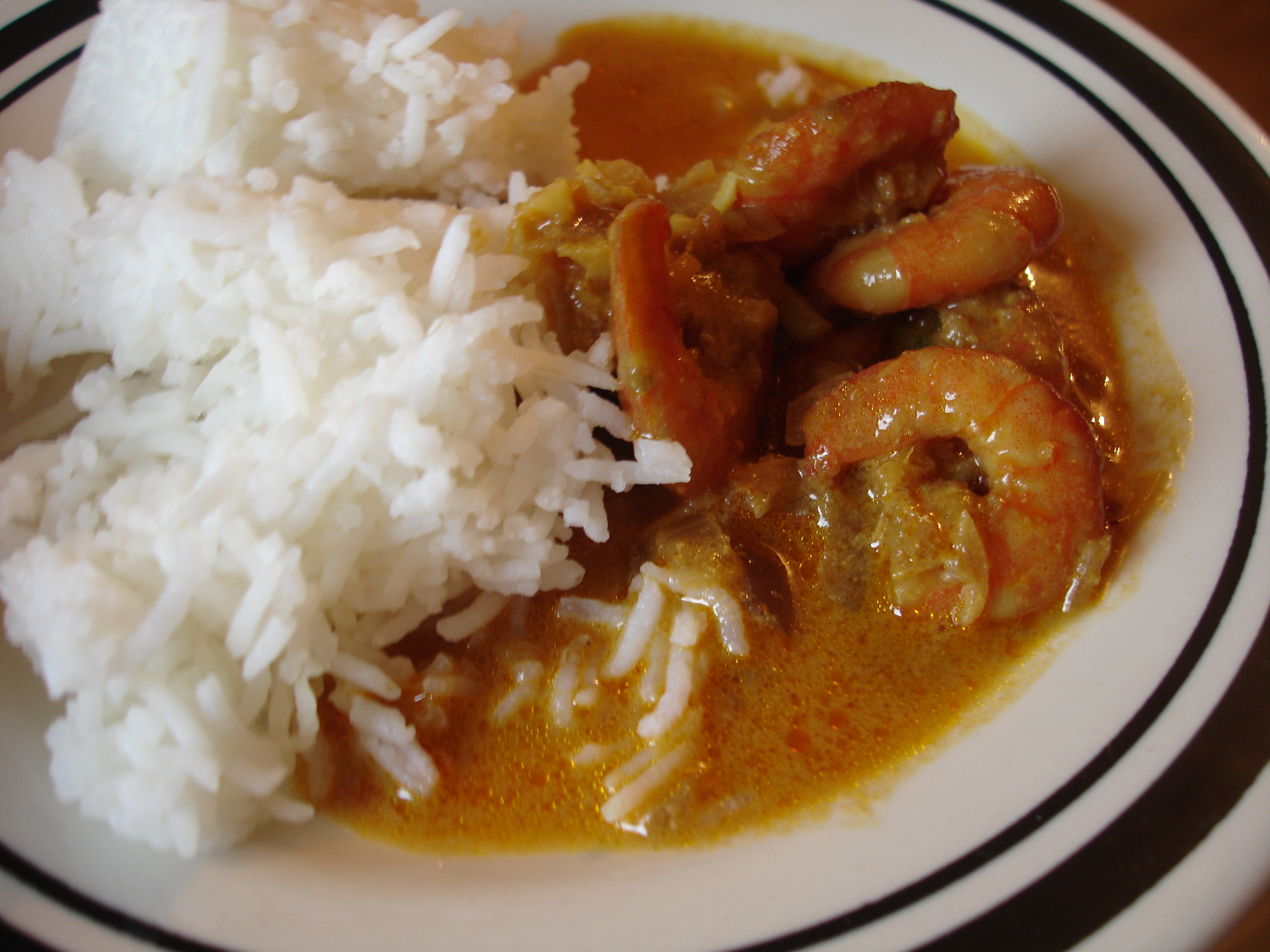
Prawn curry

Coconut, vinegar and spices are common ingredients in most curries. Sorpotel — pork cooked in a spicy sauce — is one of the most popular dishes of the Goan Catholic community. Other popular meat preparations include Cabidela, Xacuti, Choris-Pão (spicy pork sausages stuffed in bread), Vindalho, Roast Maas (spicy braised beef), Mitta Maas (salt pork), and Leitão Assado (roasted piglet). Canja de galinha and Frango à Cafreal are well-known chicken dishes. Fish curry and rice form the staple diet of Goan Catholics. Parboiled rice (Ukddem tandull), is the traditional rice eaten and preferred over raw rice (Suroi tandull). Kajel (Cashew Feni) (triple-distilled/tibrad), Cazulo (double-distilled/dobrad), and Urrak (Arrack) (single-distilled) liqueurs made from cashew apples; and Maddel (Coconut Feni), are a popular alcoholic beverages.

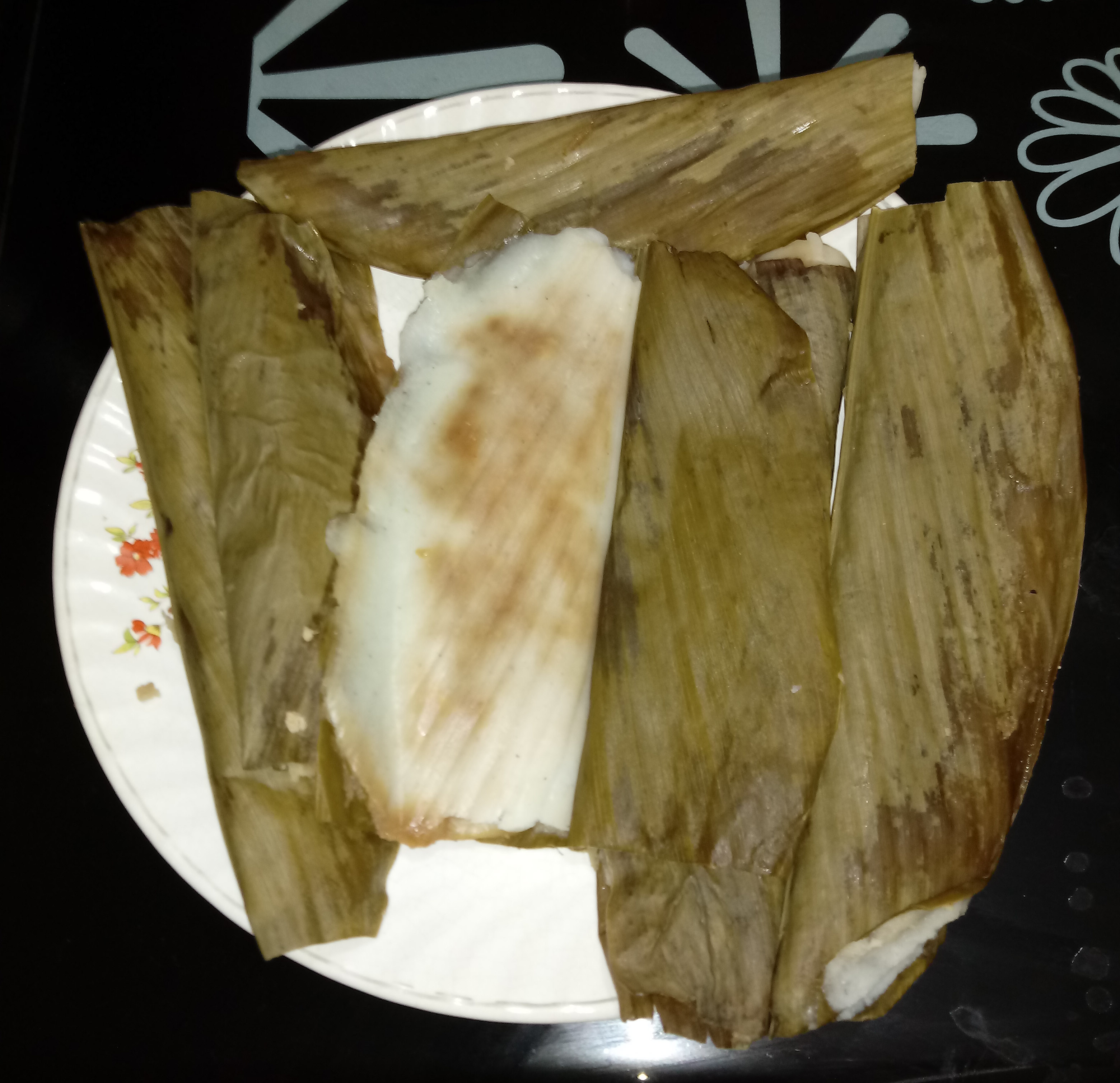
'Patoleo' are the piece de resistance of the Assumption feast celebration

Patoleo (sweet rice cakes steamed in turmeric leaves consisting of a filling of coconut and palm jaggery) are prepared on the Feasts of San Juanv (São João) on 24 June, Maria da Assunção on 15 August, and Konnsachem fest (harvest festival) which occurs across Goa during the month of August. Kuswad (Consoada) is a term used for the sweet delicacies prepared during Christmas which include Bebinca, Dodol, Bathica, Kulkuls, Neureos, and Perada.

=== Names and surnames ===
Portuguese names, having variants in both Romi Konkani and English, like Mingel (Michael) and Magdu (Magdalene) are common among Goan Catholics. Portuguese surnames (like Lobo, D’Souza, Rodrigues, Fernandes, Pereira Pereira and Pinto) are standard among Goan Catholics because of the Christianisation of Goa during Portuguese rule.

Goan Catholic variant	English variant	Portuguese variant	Meaning	Gender
Balthu	Balthasar	Baltasar	‘Bel’ is my King	Male
Pedru	Peter	Pedro	Rock	Male
Kaitan	Cajetan	Caetano	man from ‘Caieta’	Male
Juanv	John	João	God is gracious	Male
Bosteanv	Sebastian	Sebastião	Revered	Male
Lorso	Lawrence	Lourenço	man from ‘Laurentum’	Male
Mori	Mary	Maria	Beloved	Female
Joki	Joachim	Joaquim	raised by ‘YHWH’	Male
Rakel	Rachel	Raquel	Ewe or one with purity	Female
Anton	Anthony	António	Flower	Male
Jebel	Elizabeth	Isabel	My God is my oath	Female
Zuze	Joseph	José	The Lord will add	Male
Source: Msgr. S. R. Dalgado's “Grammar of Konkani Language”

=== Language and literature ===
==== Language ====
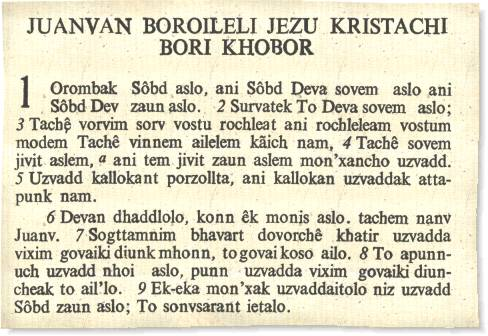
Opening verses in the "Prologue" of the Gospel of John in Konkani. Goan Catholics employ the Roman script for their religious and secular writings in Konkani.

Goan Catholics speak the Konkani language which is key to the community's identity. Konkani is an Indo-Aryan language belonging to the Indo-European family of languages, which is spoken predominantly on the west coast of India. According to linguists this dialect is largely derived from Maharashtri Prakrit and is similar to Bengali in terms of pronunciation. This dialect has a significant infusion of Marathi and Kannada loanwords. The Ethnologue identifies this dialect as the "Goan" dialect. The Goan Catholic dialect is written in the Roman script. Portuguese influence can be seen in the dialect's lexicon and syntax. 1,800 Portuguese lexical items are found in the Goan Catholic dialect. The syntactic patterns adopted from Portuguese include mostly word order patterns, such as the placement of the direct and the indirect object and of the adverb after the verb, the placement of the predicate noun after the copula, and the placement of the relative or reduced relative clause after the head noun. There are, however, some transformations as well among these patterns. Such syntactic modification is most evident in this particular dialect. It is observed only in the written word and in formal speech such as sermons. In recent times, more and more periodicals have abandoned the Portuguese syntactic patterns. The dialect is significantly different from the dialect spoken by the Hindu Goans not only with respect to Portuguese influence, but also with respect to grammatical and lexical characteristics.

==== Literature ====
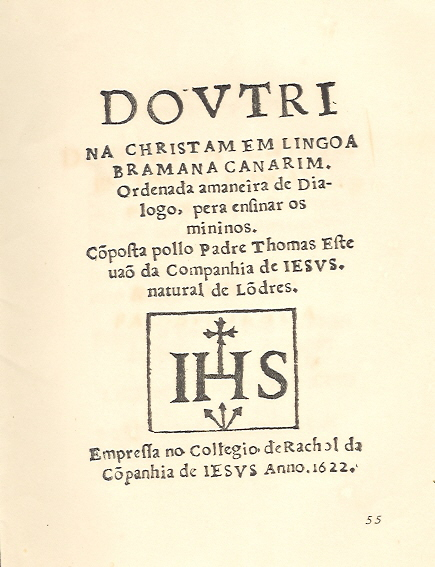
Cover of the Doutrina Christam by Fr. Thomas Stephens, the first published work in Konkani and any other Indian language.

The origin of their literature dates to 1563, when the first Konkani grammar was published by Fr Andre Vaz at St Paulo College at Old Goa. In 1567 the first Konkani-Portuguese dictionary was published by missionary priests at Rachol, Goa. In 1622 Thomas Stephens, an English Jesuit, published Doutrina Christam em Lingoa Bramana Canarim (Christian Doctrines in the Canarese Brahmin Language), which was the first book in Konkani and any Indian language. On 22 December 1821 the first periodical, Gazeta de Goa (Goa Gazetteer), edited by Antonio Jose de Lima Leitao, was published. On 22 January 1900 the first Portuguese newspaper, O Heraldo, was started by Prof. Messias Gomes. It was transformed into an English daily in 1987. Periodicals such as Amcho Ganv (1930) by Luis de Menezes, Vauraddeancho Ixxt (1933), a weekly by Fr. Arcencio Fernandes and Fr. Gracianco Moraes, Aitarachem Vachop, a Konkani weekly run by the Salesians, and Gulab by Fr. Freddy J. da Costa were published in Goa. Konkani-Portuguese periodicals such as O Concani, a weekly by Sebastiāo Jesus Dias, Sanjechem Noketr (The Evening Star) (1907) by B. F. Cabral, O Goano (1907) by Honarato Furtado and Francis Futardo, and Ave Maria (1919) edited by Antonio D'Cruz were published in Bombay. In February 1899 Udentenchem Sallok (Lotus of the East) by Eduardo J. Bruno de Souza, the first Konkani periodical, was published as a fortnightly in Poona. The first Konkani book in the Devanagri script, Kristanv Doton ani Katisism by Dr. George Octaviano Pires, was published in Sholapore in 1894. Fr. Ludovico Pereria's monthly Dor Mhoineachi Rotti (Monthly Bread) was published in Karachi in 1915. In 1911 the first Konkani novel, Kristanv Ghorabo (Christian Home), was published. Modern literature is diverse and includes themes such as historical awakening in Lambert Mascarenhas' Sorrowing Lies My Land, feminism in Maria Aurora Couto's Goa: A Daughters' Story, and fantasy in Nandita da Cunha's The Magic of Maya. In 1974, the Archdiocese of Goa and Daman published the Novo Korar (New Testament) of the Holy Bible in Konkani. Later, on 4 June 2006, the Archdiocese released the complete Catholic Bible in Konkani employing the Latin alphabet known as Povitr Pustok. In 2018, Archbishop of Goa and Daman Filipe Neri Ferrao launched the Povitr Pustok, a Konkani Bible app, a mobile phone application software with the entire Konkani Bible text.

=== Traditions and festivals ===
==== Traditions ====
Many Indian customs and traditions persist among the Goan Catholics, which are more conspicuous during their marriage festivities.

Traditionally, as in other Indian communities, arranged marriages were the norm. Pre-marriage traditions include Soirik (matrimonial alliance), Utor (promise of marriage), Mudi (engagement ceremony), Amontron (wedding invitation), Porcond (bridal shower), Chuddo (glass bangles) ceremony wherein the bride's forearms are adorned with colourful glass bangles of green, yellow, and red which are symbolic of fertility and married life, Saddo (red or pink dress) ceremony of cutting and sewing the bridal dress, the bridegroom's Hair-cutting ritual, and Bhuim jevon (a ritual meal in honour of the ancestors) or Bhikream jevon (a meal for the poor or beggars). Dennem (trousseau) is sent to the groom's house the day before the wedding.

The Ros (anointing) ceremony held on the evening before the wedding involves the parents, relatives, and friends blessing the soon-to-be-wed couple before they begin their married life. It is conducted at the bride's and bridegroom's respective homes, who along with their bridesmaids and best men are ceremonially bathed with Apros (first extract of coconut milk). The bridegroom's/bride's mother dabs her thumb in coconut oil and anoints her son's/daughter's forehead by placing the sign of the cross on it. Special commemorative songs called Zoti are sung for the occasion. On the wedding day, the bridal couple receive Besanv (Benediction) ceremoniously from their parents and elders before the families leave their individual homes for the church to celebrate the Resper (Nuptial Mass) which is followed by the wedding reception later in the evening.

Traditions post the reception include Hatant dinvcheak (handing over) the bride solemnly by the father or the guardian of the bride to the groom's family, Shim (boundary) ritual which involves crossing an imaginary boundary created by pouring liquor on the ground as the Vor (bridal party) prepare to leave for the groom's house. After the ritual, one or two relatives from the bride's side formally invite the newlyweds to the bride's home for a celebration the next day. This is known as Apovnnem (invitation) in Konkani and the occasion is called Portovnnem (ceremonial return).

==== Festivals ====
Konsachem fest (harvest festival) celebrated on 15 August that involves blessing of new harvests are other Goan Catholic celebrations.

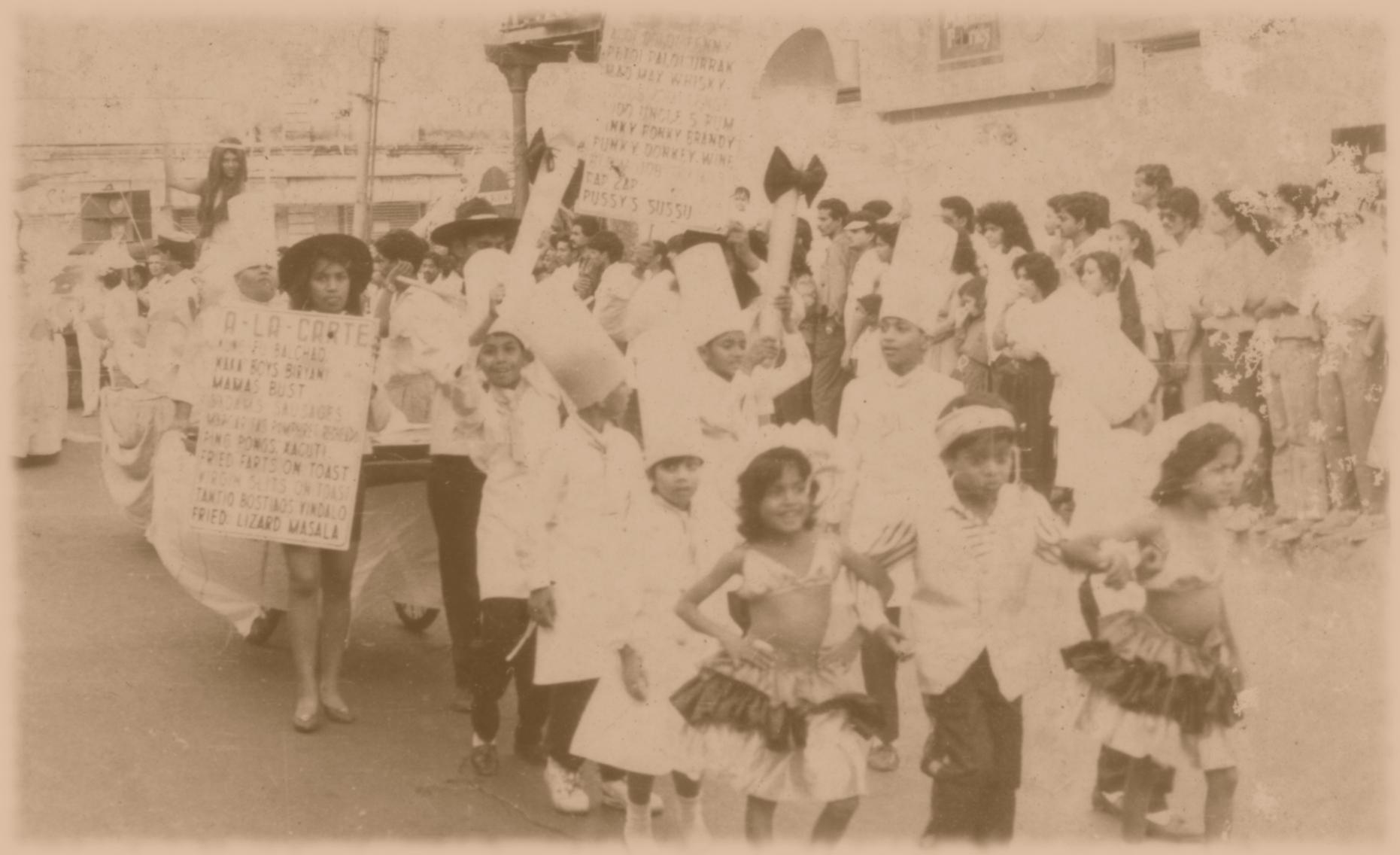
Goan Catholics participating at the Intruz (Goan Carnival), late 20th century

In addition to common Christian festivals like Christmas, Good Friday, and Easter, the community celebrates many other festivals of religious and historical significance. The Zagor (nocturnal vigil in Konkani), mainly celebrated in Siolim, in Bardez taluka, is a festival highlighted by dance, drama and music. The Feast of Saint Francis Xavier, one of the major festivals of the Goan Catholics, is celebrated on 3 December annually to honour the saint's death. The Nativity of the Blessed Virgin Mary (Monti Saibinichem Fest in Konkani, Feast of Our Lady of the Mount) on 8 September is a major festival, especially in Chinchinim. Milagres Saibinichem Fest is the feast of Our Lady of Miracles, celebrated at St. Jerome Church (Mapusa). Contrary to popular belief, Goa Carnival is a commercial festival in Goa. Its current form (King Momo, floats, etc.) was created only in 1965 to attract tourists.

=== Costumes and ornaments ===
In the past, Goan Catholic women wore a hol, a white sheet over their saris, while going to Church.

In the early period of Portuguese rule, Goan Catholic women were married in whites saris (hol) and changed into a red dress or sari, known as saddo, at home. Women of the upper strata wore the Fota-Kimao after the Church ceremony. Fota was a blouse made of red velvet and satin with a black border and embroidered with gold thread. Accessories used along with the fota included a variety of jewellery worn on the head, ears, neck, and arms. The fator was an ornament that consisted of a green stone between two corals held by double chains. Together with the fator, women wore a set of five intricate chains known as contti, and other chains. Women wore bangles known as nille with matching carap on their ears. They also wore few small chains from the ear to the head, combs made of gold (dantoni), silver, or tortoise shell, and rings on every finger. During the later period of Portuguese rule, women got married in Western clothes. The Cordao (wedding necklace) was a necklace with two black-beaded chains reminiscent of the Hindu Mangalsutra, interspersed with roughly twenty gold coins, which formed a gold pendant, often in the shape of Jesus or the cross. A widow had to wear black clothes for the rest of her life and was not allowed to wear ornaments.

=== Society ===
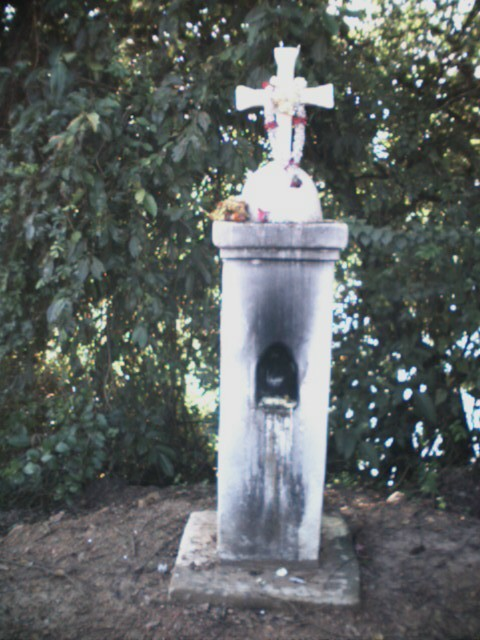
A typical white Sant Khuris (Holy Cross) of a Goan Catholic family, constructed using old-style Portuguese architecture

Goan Catholics retained the same caste system which their ancestors had followed. A village in Goa was known as Ganv, its freeholder was the Ganvkar, and Ganvkari included the Ganvkars' village associations and co-operatives. Village communities were known as Ganvponn, which the Portuguese referred to as Comunidades.

The mass was celebrated in Latin; the Homily was delivered to the congregation in Konkani.

==== Caste ====
Native Catholics in rural Goa retained their former Hindu castes. The Bamonns (the Konkani word for Brahmins) were members of the Hindu priestly caste. Brahmin sub-castes (such as the Goud Saraswat Brahmins, the Padyes, the Daivadnyas), the goldsmiths and some merchants were lumped into the Christian caste of Bamonn.

The Chardos (the Konkani word for Kshatriyas) were converts from the Kshatriya (military/ royal class) caste, and included members from the Vaishya Vani caste (merchant class). Those Vaishyas who were not incorporated into the Chardo caste were called Gauddos, and formed the fourth group. The artisan converts formed the third-biggest group and were known as Sudirs (labour class). The Dalits or "Untouchables" who converted to Christianity became Mahars and Chamars, who formed the fifth group. They were later merged to the Sudirs. The Christian converts of the aboriginal stock known as Gavddis were termed Kunbi. Although they still observe the caste system, they consider it the unhappiest heritage of their pre-Christian past.

==== Occupation ====
After conversion, the most popular occupation of Goan Catholic men was that of sailor. Others served as government officials for the Portuguese. Goan Catholics also became doctors, architects, lawyers and businessmen. Agriculture was mainly done by rural women because they were skilled farmers. Rural men practised carpentry and other artisanal professions, constructing churches and other structures under Portuguese supervision. In the late seventeenth century, many Goan Catholic women had received education and also became employed as teachers or feitoria workers. Other crafts and industries were nonexistent.

=== Performing arts ===
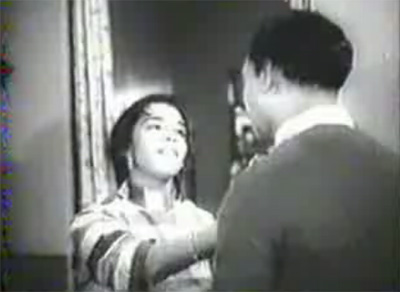
A still from Frank Fernand's monochrome Konkani film Amchem Noxib

On 24 April 1950, Mogacho Aunddo (Desire of Love), the first Konkani film by Al Jerry Braganza, was released at Mapusa, Goa. Frank Fernandes, whose stage name was Frank Fernand (1919–2007; born in Curchorem, Goa), was a renowned film maker and musician and is remembered for his movies like Amchem Noxib (Our Luck) in 1963 and Nirmonn (Destiny) in 1966. Other films produced in Goa include Bhunyarantlo Monis (Cave Man) and Padri (Priest). Remo Fernandes, a singer and musician, was the first person to introduce fusion music in India.

The Konkani hymn Asli Mata Dukhest, which was translated into Konkani from the Latin hymn Stabat Mater, is sung during Lent. Jocachim Miranda, a Goan Catholic priest, composed Riglo Jezu Molliant (Jesus entered the Garden of Gethsemene) during his Canara mission. Diptivonti, Sulokinni, an eighteenth-century Konkani hymn, was performed at a concert held in the Holy Spirit Church, Margao, Goa. Other hymns composed by Goan Catholics include Dona Barrete's Papeanchi Saratinni (Sinners Repent), Carlos Jrindade Dias' Sam Jose Bogta Bagvionta, and Fr. Pascal Baylon Dias' San Francisco Xaveria. Konkani pop music became popular after Indian Independence. Chris Perry and Lorna Cordeiro are known for the Bebdo (Drunkard) in 1976 and Pisso (Mad) in the 1970s, while Frank Fernand's Konkani ballad Claudia from 1966 is popular.

The Mando, a contemporary form of dance music, evolved in Salcette in the first half of the nineteenth century out of wedding music, specifically the Ovi. The songs in this style are serene and sedate, generally a monologue in the Bramhin Konkani dialects of the South Goan villages of Loutolim, Raia, Curtorim, and Benaulim. They are traditionally sung during the Shim (bridal departure) ceremony. Early composers of the Mando were Ligorio de Costa of Courtarim (1851–1919) and Carlos Trindade Dias. Deknni is a semi-classical dance form. One woman starts the dance and is later accompanied by other dancers. The Mussoll (pestle dance), believed to be first performed by the Kshatriyas of Chandor, commemorates the victory of King Harihara II (son of King Bukka I of the Vijaynagar Empire) over the Chola Empire at Chandrapur fortification in the fourteenth century. Other dances are the Portuguese Corridinho and Marcha. Dulpod is dance music with a quick rhythm and themes from everyday Goan life. Fell is a music genre performed by men and women during the Goa Carnival. Other dances performed at the Goan Carnival are Fulwali, Nistekaram, Vauradi, and Kunbi. The Ghumot is a musical instrument played, especially during weddings, and is used while performing a Mando. The instrument has the form of an earthen pot that is open at both sides. One end is covered with the skin of some wild animal, and the other is left open.

Konkani Plays, known as ‘Tiatr’ (theatre), a form of classic stage performance with live singing and acting, were written and staged in Goa. The form evolved in the 20th century with pioneer tiatrists such as Jao Agostinho Fernandes (1871–1941). Tiatr's themes include melodramas about family and domestic life, with each lyricist offering his own explanation for life's varied problems. Tiatrists include Prince Jacob and Roseferns, and in the past M. Boyer, C. Alvares, and Alfred Rose. On 17 April 1892 the first tiatr Italian Bhurgo by Lucasinho Ribeiro was staged in Mumbai. In 2007, the Government of Goa started the Tiatr Academy to facilitate the development of the Tiart. The tradition Of Voviyo, ancient folk songs that were sung by women during a Ros, began prior to 1510 A.D. The tradition had to be discarded due to Portuguese prosecution, and the songs now live in the form of archives. The few which still prevail are recited to this day at weddings, expressing lofty sentiments that give vent to the feelings of the people about the marriage partners and their families and invoke the blessing of God on them.

Adeus Korchu Vellu Paulu
("The Farewell Hour is here")
Adeus korchu vellu paulo.
The time of farewell is now here

Ai mhojem kalliz rê fapsota.
Oh! my heart begins to fear (Repeat previous two lines)

Dispediru korchea vellar,
At this moment of saying farewell,

Ho sonvsar naka-so disota.
In this world I no longer wish to dwell. (Repeat previous two lines)

— Torquato de Figuerio (1876–1948), Mando taken from the book Greatest Konkani Song Hits Vol. 1, arranged by Francis Rodrigues, p. 24

Goan Catholics have also played an important role in Bollywood music. (See Goans in Hindi film music composition)

== Organisations ==
Goenkaranchi Ekvot is a registered organisation of Goan Catholics residing in Delhi. In Bangalore, associations such as the Karnataka Goan Association serve the community. The Kuwait Konknni Kendr is a well-known Goan Catholic organisation in Kuwait. The Goan Overseas Association in Toronto, Indian Catholic Association of Central Texas, the Indo-Pakistani Christian Association, and the Canorient Christian Association are popular organisations in North America. In the United Kingdom, Goan Voice UK, the Young London Goan Society (YLGS), Goan Community Association, and Siolim Association, based in London, are popular organisations. In the Middle East, the Goan Community of Oman is well known.

== Notable Goan Catholics ==
Goan Catholics	Notes
Vincent Alvares	Medical practitioner and Chemist of John V of Portugal
Adeodato Barreto	Poet and writer
Abade Faria	Priest and hypnotist
Teresa Albuquerque	Historian
Alfred Rose	Singer, Tiatrist
Jaime Valfredo Rangel	Founder of Tipografia Rangel, pioneer of media and tiatr
Bruno Coutinho	Footballer
Charles Correa	Architect
Evarist Pinto	Archbishop of Karachi
Francisco Luís Gomes	Physician, politician, writer, historian, and economist
Ivan Dias	Archbishop of Bombay from 8 November 1996 – 20 May 2006, Prefect of Congregation for the Evangelization of Peoples, Rome
Keith Vaz	British Labour Party politician, Member of Parliament for Leicester East
Valerie Vaz	British Labour Party politician, Member of Parliament for Walsall South
Oswald Gracias	Cardinal, Archbishop of Mumbai
Lorna Cordeiro	Singer and tiatrist
José Gerson da Cunha	Physician, orientalist, historian and numismatist
Froilano de Mello	Microbiologist, medical scientist, professor, author and independent MP in the Portuguese parliament
Wallis Mathias	Cricketer
Anthony Mascarenhas	Journalist
Jerry Pinto	Writer
Patricia Rozario	Soprano
José Vaz	Missionary, Patron Saint of Sri Lanka

== See also ==
- Christianity in Goa
- Christianization of Goa
- Portuguese India
- Roman Catholic Archdiocese of Goa and Daman
- Konkani in the Roman script
- Culture of Goan Catholics
- Goan Catholic cuisine
- Goa Inquisition
- Architecture of Goan Catholics
- Goan Catholics under the British Indian Empire
