= Goan Catholic cuisine =

Cuisine of the Goan Catholic community

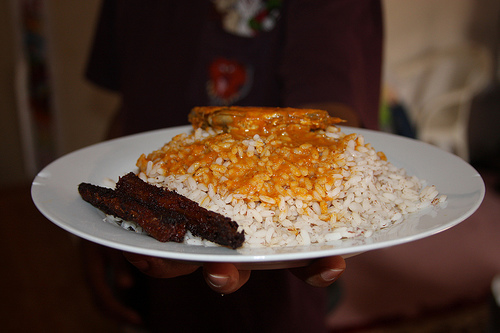
Rice-Curry-Fish (Xit-Koddi-Nustem), the staple food of the Goan Catholics

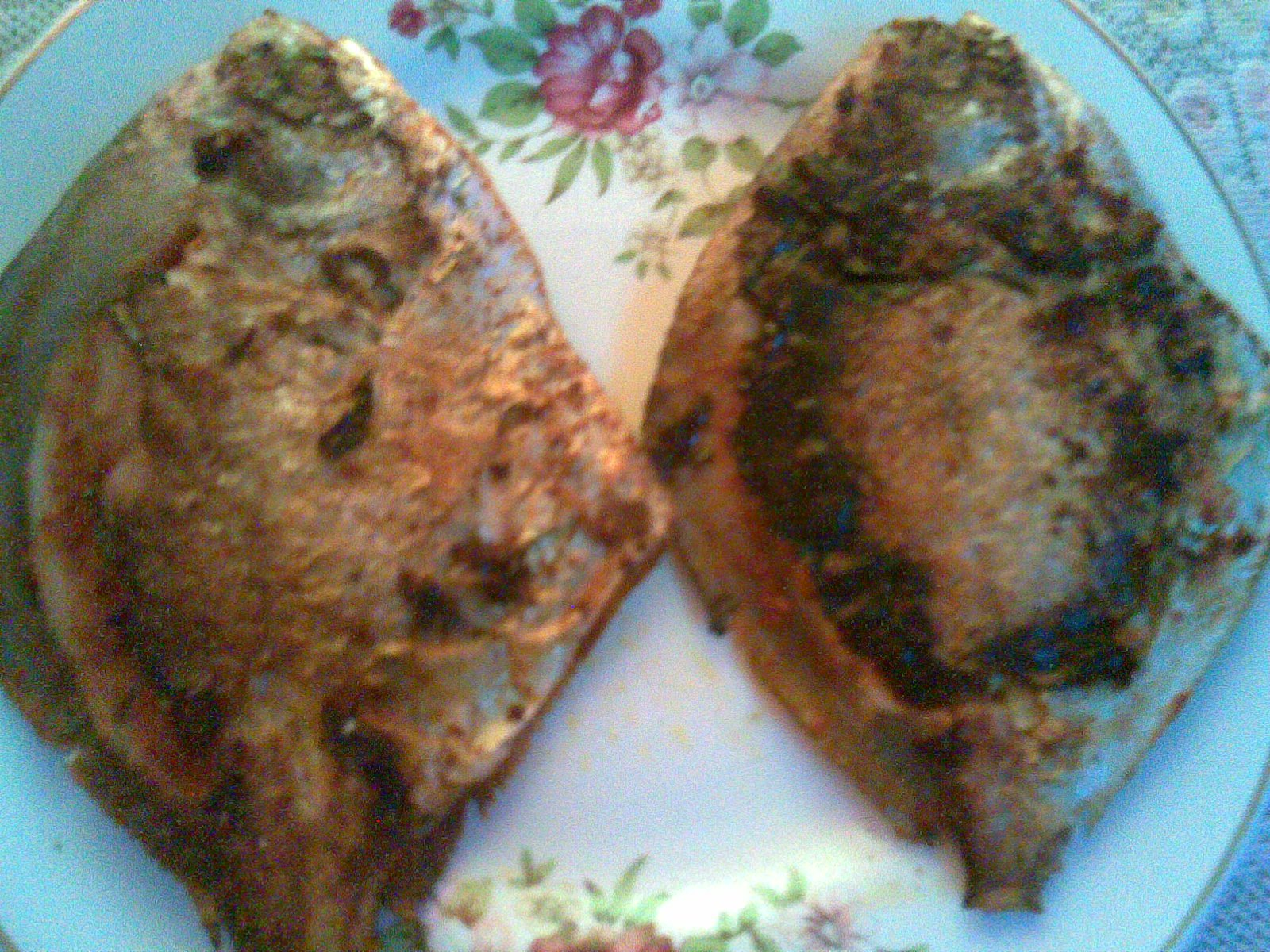
Pomfret fish pan-fried in Rechado masala

Goan Catholic Cuisine is the cuisine of the Goan Catholic community and is largely influenced by Portuguese cuisine. Due to over 450 years of Portuguese rule, the cuisine of Goan Catholics is dominated by ingredients and techniques of Portuguese cuisine like deep-frying, oven-baking, pork, vinegar, egg-based desserts, alcohol, etc.

== Non-vegetarian ==
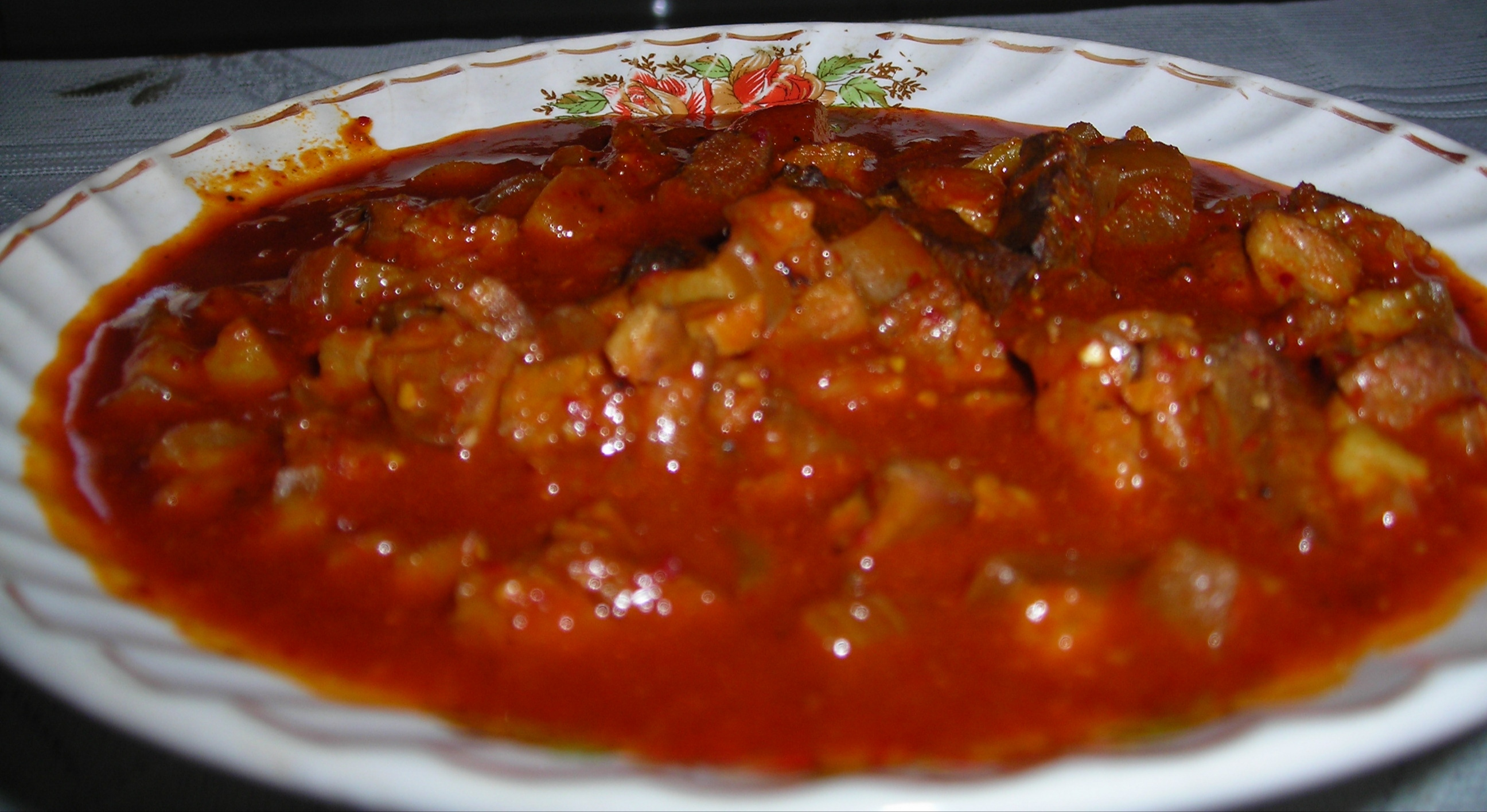
Sorpotel, a picquant pork gravy

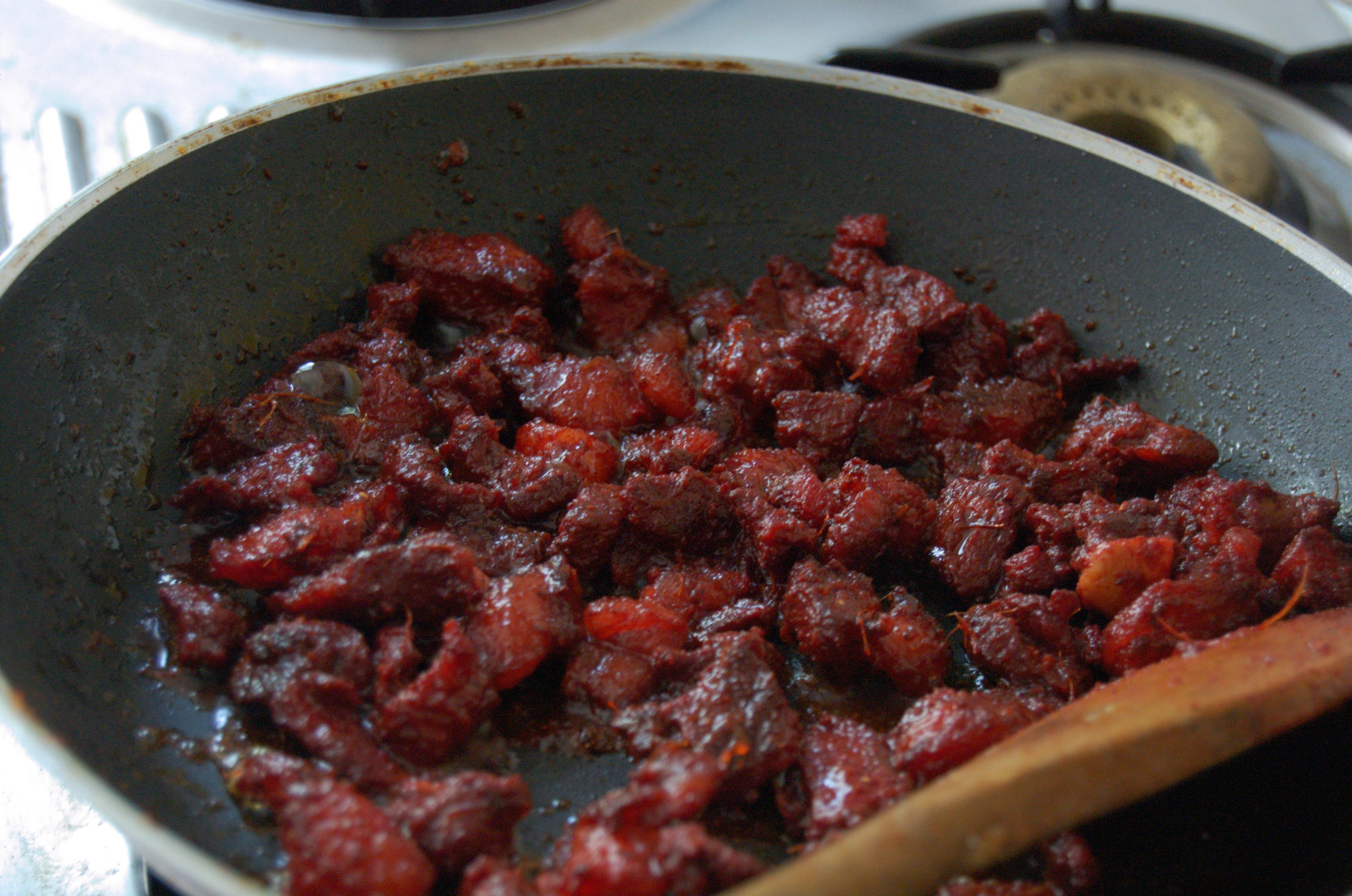
Sautéed Chouriço (Goa sausages)

Goan Catholic cuisine has distinct Portuguese influence as can be seen in the Leitão and Assado de Porco, a famous pork roast crackling dish served as the centrepiece at wedding dinners, the Sorpotel and Cabidela (a dish wherein fresh pig's blood is stirred into the pork delicacy). The curries use a lot of spices and vinegar. Xit-Koddi (Xit — parboiled or red rice; Koddi — fish curry) forms the staple food of the community. Other popular Portuguese influenced delicacies are Choris (pork sausages), Vindalho, Peixe Recheado, and Xacuti.

The Chamuça is a Goan derivative of the samosa, which is usually filled with minced beef or minced pork, and is a well-known snack. Beef croquettes and prawn rissoles are common snacks. Sliced roast beef and beef tongue are popular entrees at Goan celebrations. The traditional, Molho de Peixe (fish pickle) and Balchão (prawn pickle), are originally from Macau.

== Sweets ==
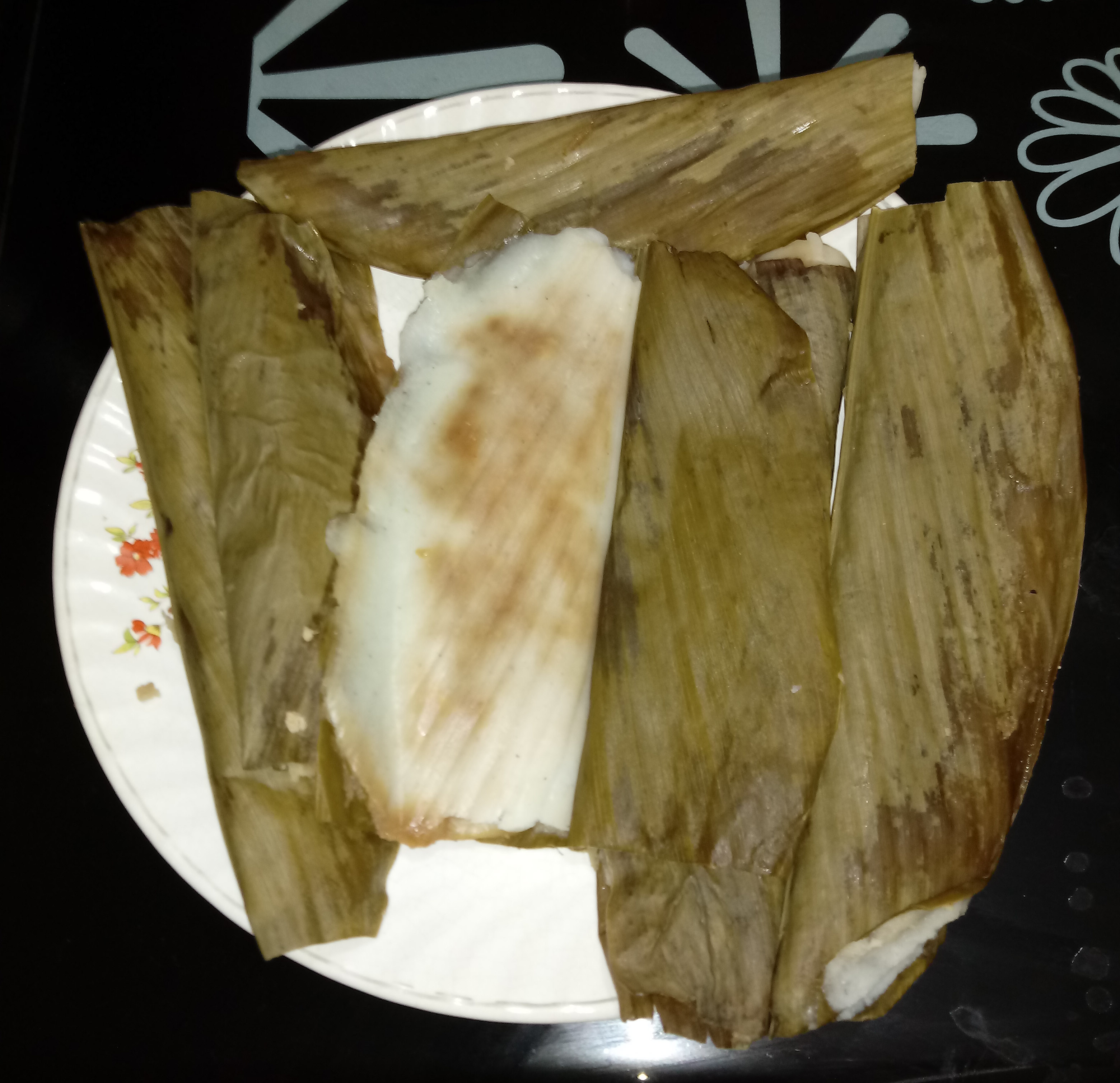
'Patoleo' are the pièce de résistance of the Assumption feast celebration.

Patoleo (sweet rice cakes steamed in turmeric leaves consisting of a filling of coconut and palm jaggery) are prepared on the Feasts of the Assumption of the Blessed Virgin Mary on 15 August, Saõ João (Nativity of Saint John the Baptist) on 24 June and Konsachem fest (harvest festival) which occurs across Goa during the month of August.

Pez (a type of congee), Koiloris and Podecho (pancakes) are popular delicacies. The Sanna is another popular delicacy made from soaked rice and coconut toddy.

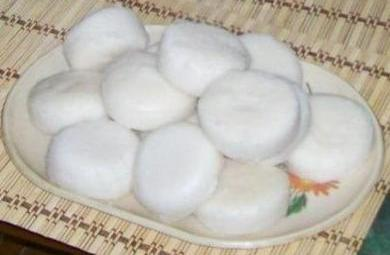
Sannas

Kadio bodio (tiny sticks made with wheat flour, dipped in sugar syrup or jaggery and dried) are a bestseller at fairs. Revdyo, Tizan, Godshem, Filhoses (a stuffed pancake) and Arroz doce (a Portuguese rice pudding containing eggs) are also popular. Neureos are deep-fried turnovers stuffed with dried coconut, nuts, raisins, and sugar. Kulkul is a curly concoction of deep-fried egg-enriched sweet wheat dough. Bolinhas are small coconut cakes. Perada is a guava-based candy. Batica is a moist, rich coconut cake. Maçapão is cashewnut marzipan formed into the shape of fruits and vegetables. Dôce de grão is a sweet made using chickpeas and coconut. Bebinca is a rich egg-based multi-layered sweet dish, for which Goa is famous.

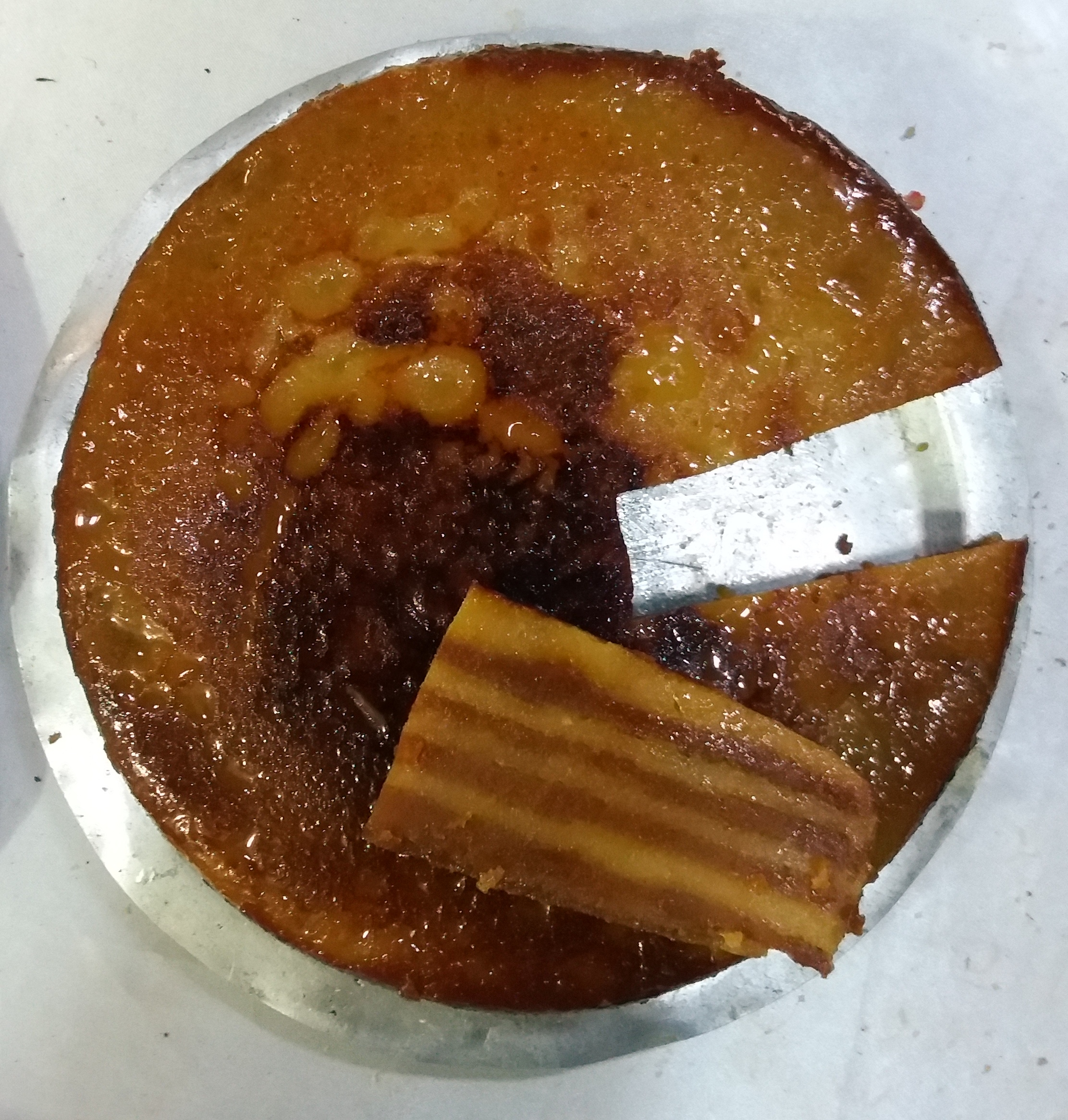
Home made Bebinca from Goa, India

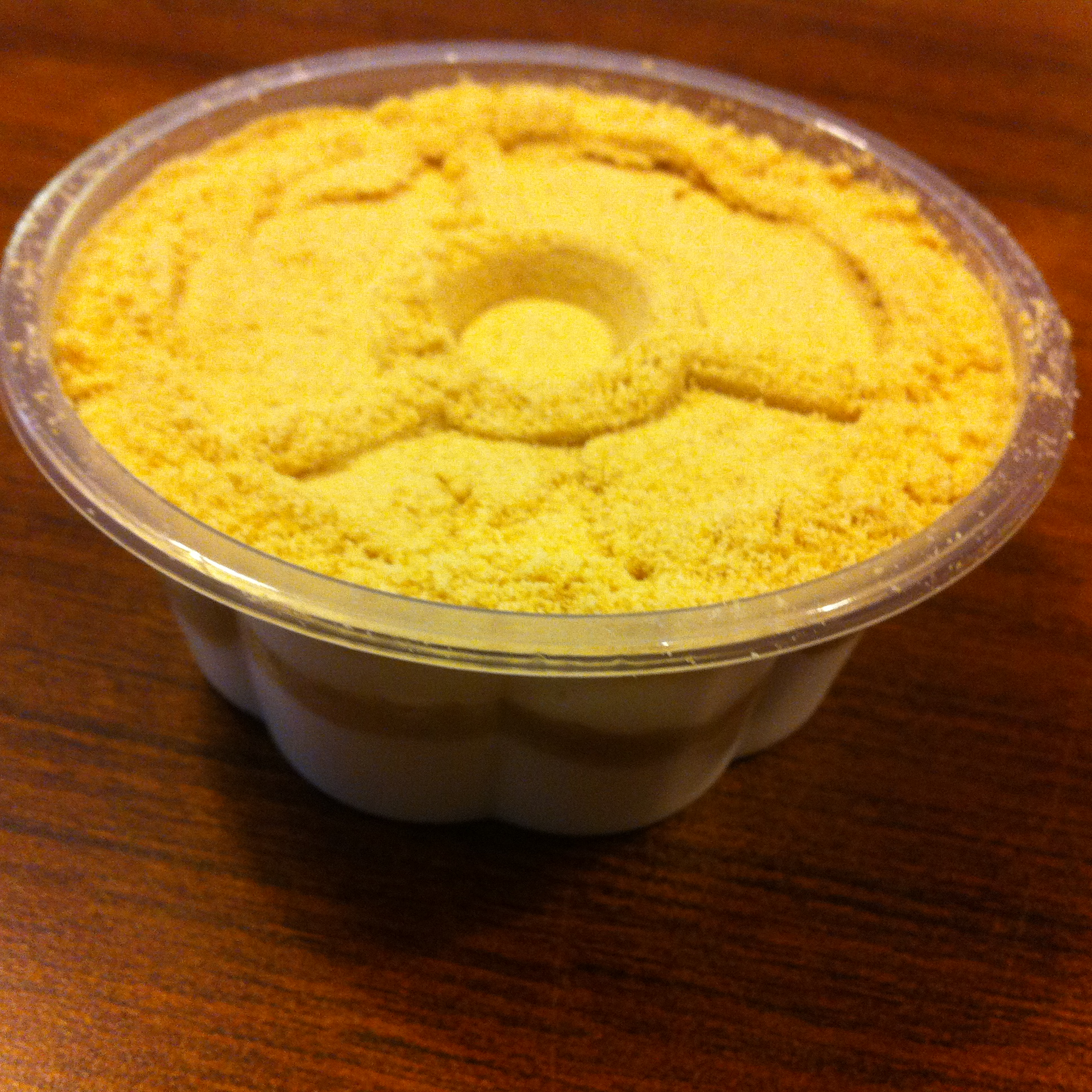
Serradura

== See also ==
- Goan cuisine
