= Lorna Cordeiro =

Indian singer (born 1944)

Lorna
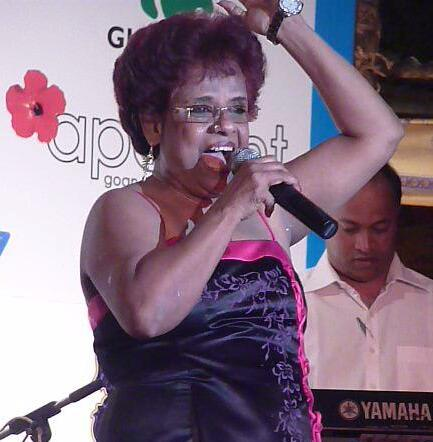
- Lorna in 2014
- Born: Lorna Cordeiro; 9 August 1944 (age 82); Bombay, British India
- Citizenship: British Raj (until 1947); India (from 1947)
- Occupation: Singer
- Years active: 1960–1973; 1995–present
- Partner(s): Chris Perry (c. 1961–1973)
- Musical career
- Origin: Bombay, Bombay State, India
- Genres: Konkani music; Jazz
- Instruments: Vocals
- Labels: His Master's Voice; EMI

Lorna Cordeiro (born 9 August 1944), known mononymously as Lorna, is an Indian singer. Referred to as the "Nightingale of Goa", she performed with jazz trumpeter Chris Perry in the 1960s and 1970s. Her association with Perry ended in 1973, causing her to quit the music industry. She later came out of retirement in 1995, and still continues to perform.

== Early life ==
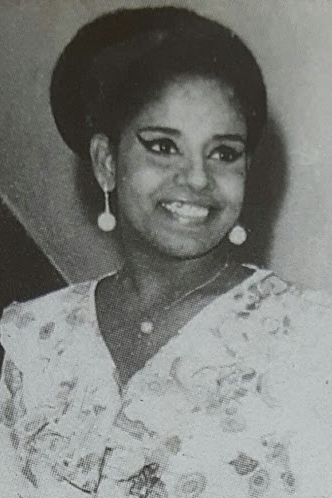
Lorna during her youth

Lorna Cordeiro was born in Bombay on 9 August 1944 to Cecelia and Theophilus Cordeiro who hailed from Saligao, Goa. She is the third of their six children. Her family were Goan Catholics. Lorna's father encouraged his children in music and to speak Konkani at home; their immediate neighbour in Goa, recalls being very impressed by the family's singing of Konkani hymns. Cordeiro recalled how as a young girl another Parsi neighbour in Mumbai would clap and gift her four annas whenever he heard her sing along with the radio.

== Career ==
=== 1960–1973: Initial career ===
Lorna began her career by singing at weddings as part of a band called Bajaj and his Dance Band. She was recognized by a musician who first heard her sing "Where The Boys Are" on Marvé Beach. He then invited her to sing "Under the Mango Tree" from Dr. No with his band at the Bandra fair. This performance impressed musician Chris Perry, who was in the audience and had been looking for a crooner. After an audition, she began singing for Perry's band at the age of 15 and continued with them until she turned 26. He thus helped her launch her career and she regards him as her guru. She became a popular jazz singer in nightclubs and star hotels in Mumbai, Calcutta, Madras, Delhi and Bangalore.

Lorna is known mainly for singing in Konkani. Most of these songs were arranged and composed by Chris Perry. Her first song was "Bebdo" (transl. "Drunkard"), which she performed on Miramar Beach, Goa. It shocked the audience due to its explicit nature. She soon became well known for her other songs, such as "Nachomia Kumpasar", "Pisso", "Red Rose", "Lisboa", "Adeus", "Tuzo Mog", "Noxibak Roddttam", "Abghat", "Calangute", "Aik Re Khobrankara", "Sorga Rajeant", "Pavsachea Tempar", "Amerikak Pavxi", "Sorg Tujea Dolleamni", "Tum Ani Hanv", "Ugddas" and "Mhoji Mai". As her popularity increased, the public started demanding only her solo performances from Perry, who then bound her by contract to not perform with anyone else for twenty years. She subsequently left music for a period of 23 years after a disagreement with him when she was 26 years old.

=== 1995–present: Comeback and other projects ===
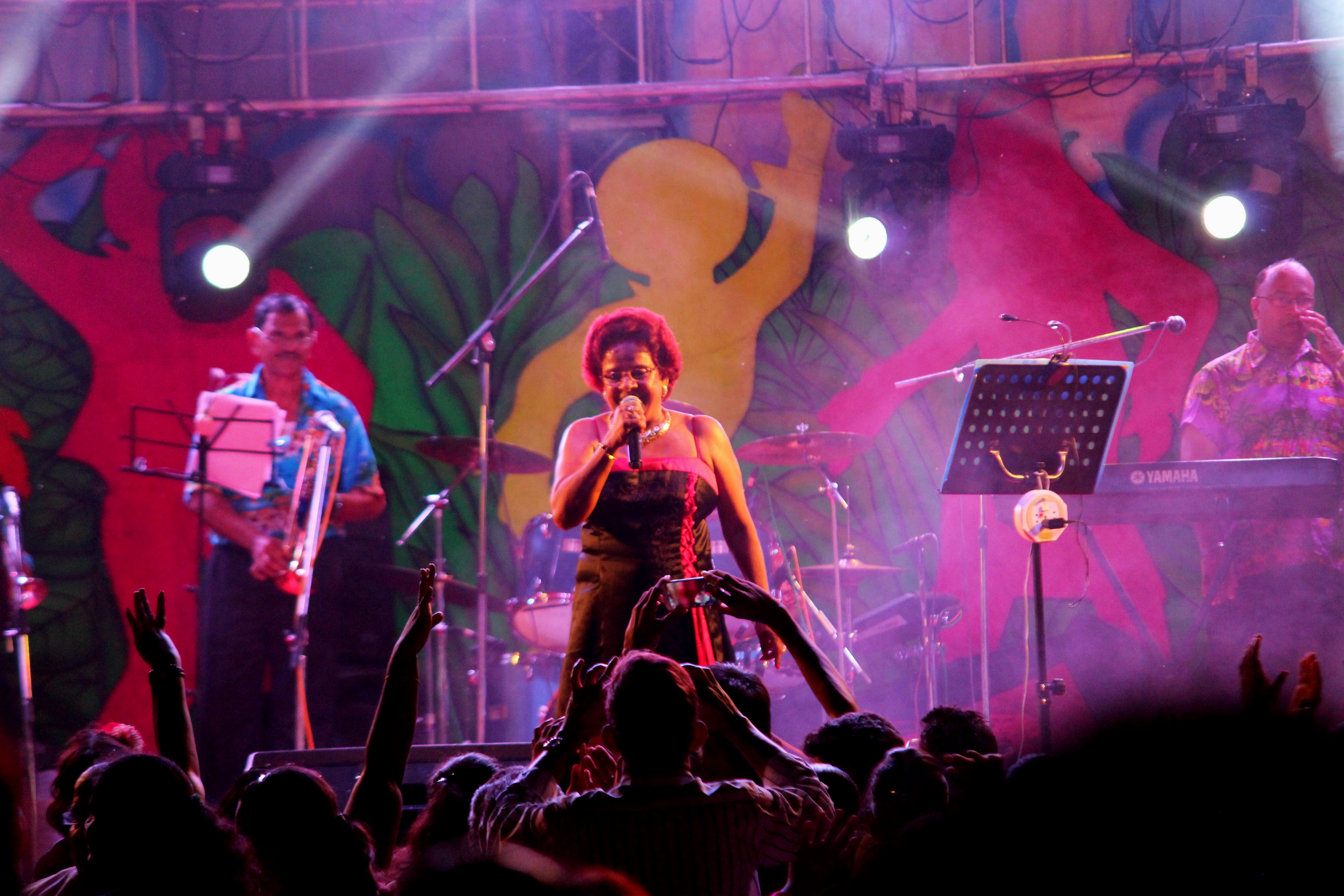
Lorna performing at a concert in 2015

In 1995, music director Ronnie Monseratte, who had been a part of Perry's band, managed to convince her to sing again. After a year of hesitation, she agreed to perform in a concert titled Hello Lorna, which was directed by Monseratte. However, on the day of the first show at Miramar Beach, on 1 December 1995, Perry came to the venue and showed the media the contract that she had signed to not sing with anyone else and threatened legal proceedings. After hiring new musicians, the concert began with Cordeiro performing "Aikat Mazo Tavlo" (transl. "Listen to my voice"). The concert's songs were released in a 1996 album of the same name.

In her long career, Cordeiro has sung for many great Bollywood music directors such as Bappi Lahiri, Kalyanji-Anandji, Laxmikant–Pyarelal and Rajesh Roshan. She has even sung alongside Mohammed Rafi ("Maria") and Sudesh Bhosle. After her comeback, she has performed in countries of the Middle East like Dubai, Kuwait, Qatar and Bahrain and even in parts of Europe like London. She is seen performing in the 2004 Konkani film Aleesha, and the 2019 Konkani musical film, Kantaar, features Lorna singing some jazz songs.

== Personal life ==
While she was underage, Cordeiro was in a relationship with Goan musician, Chris Perry, who was sixteen years older and was also married, while they were both working together. However, following their breakup on her 27th birthday in 1973, she was unable to perform for nearly 23 years. Perry would threaten and assault anyone who would approach her to sing professionally. Lorna also remained unmarried because Perry also threatened possible suitors. She then began working as a compounder in a dentist's clinic, and was a victim of alcoholism before musician Ronnie Monserrate convinced her to start singing again in 1995. She currently lives in Dhobitalao, Mumbai.

== In popular culture ==
=== Films ===
- Bombay Velvet, the Bollywood film, is set in the 1960s and Lorna's voice was inspirational to Bollywood actress Anushka Sharma. Anurag Kashyap says that Anushka's character is a tribute to Lorna.
- Nachom-ia Kumpasar (transl. Let's dance to the rhythm), is a Konkani film. It is based on the lives of jazz musicians Chris Perry and Lorna. The film takes its title from the name of a song by the two artists. The story is told through over 20 popular Konkani songs from the 1960s and 1970s that have been re-recorded for this film. It is set in the 1960s and is a tribute to the "unsung" Konkani musicians of that era.

=== Advertisements ===
In 2007, an international ad campaign by Nike for its cricket equipment featured a Konkani song "Rav Patrao Rav", based on the song "Bebdo". The advertisement was created and executed by the J. Walter Thompson advertising agency that made the ad and the song was recomposed by Ram Sampath.

== Awards ==
In 2015, Cordeiro was presented with a Lifetime Achievement award at the "Film, Food, Fashion Festival", by Vishnu Wagh, then MLA and Vice-Chairman of Entertainment Society of Goa (ESG). In 2018, she was awarded the Krutadnyata Puraskar (Lifetime Achievement Award) at the 11th Goa Marathi Film Festival, held at Kala Academy.

== Discography ==
Albums

- Concanim Hit Parade With Chris Perry And A Galaxy Of Top Artistes (1969), EMI, His Master's Voice
- Hit Music From Goa (1977), EMI
- Chris Perry's Golden Hits (1979, re-released 2006)
- Hello Lorna (1996), Ronnie M. Productions
- Unforgettable Hits (2007), Sinaris

Singles

- "Aikat mazo tavlo"
- "Nachomia Kumpasar"
- "Pisso"
- "Bebdo"
- "Red Rose"
- "Lisboa"
- "Adeus"
- "Tuzo Mog"
- "Noxibak Roddttam"
- "Maria", with Mohammed Rafi
- "Sorga Rajeant"
- "Abghat"
- "Aik re khobrankara"
- "Amerikak Pavxi"
- "Sorg Tujea Dolleamni"
- "Tum Ani Hanv"
- "Ugddas"
- "Mhoji Mai"
- "Calangute"
- "Pavsachea Tempar"
