= Bebdo =

Konkani song by Lorna Cordeiro

"Bebdo" is a traditional Goan Konkani song composed by Chris Perry and sung by Lorna. It was a part of the album Lorna - Unforgettable Hits. The song is about a drunkard husband who troubles his wife.

== Nike ad ==
An international ad campaign by Nike for its cricket equipment featured a Konkani song "Rav Patrao Rav" sung by Ella Castellino based on the song "Bebdo" as the theme music. The lyrics to the new song were written by Agnello Dias (who worked in the JWT advertising agency that made the ad) and recomposed by Ram Sampat.

The ad was shot on a set in Karjat, Maharashtra over a month on a budget of Rs 1 crore. Indian bowlers S. Sreesanth and Zaheer Khan have cameos in the ad.
