= Goa Special Status =

2008 state proposal

Goa effectively came under Indian control with the annexation of Goa and Damaon in 1961

Special Status for Goa is an ongoing proposal, first proposed in 2008, to grant the state of Goa with additional powers within the Government of India. Proponents of the idea have argued that Government of Goa should be given certain powers by the Indian Government by amending Article 371I of the Constitution of India, to preserve the unique culture and history of this subregion of Konkan. These powers would allow the Government of Goa to enact legislation to protect the private property rights of the Goans and put restrictions on the sale of land by Goans.

== Unique culture protection ==
There are actions initiated both by the Goa Government and some citizen groups to further the demand for grant of Special Status Powers. A delegation of the MSSG led By Adv. Antonio Lobo handed over a memorandum to the chief minister, Mr. Manohar Parrikar. A discussion over the amendment to Article 371 (i) of the Indian Constitution was deliberated upon. The Goa Legislative Assembly unanimously passed a resolution for Grant of Special Status and a delegation led by the chief minister of Goa met the prime minister to apprise him of the need for Special Status. Among the citizen groups, there was Goa Movement for Special Status led by late Mathany Saldanha and Movement for special status for Goa (MSSG). Adv. Antonio Lobo is the convenor, Mr. Prajal Sakhardande, the secretary and Mr. Antonio Alvares is the joint secretary.

== Origins of the Special Status Movement ==
Goa was a Portuguese colony and Indian government annexed Goa on 19 December 1961. After the invasion, steps were taken by the Indian government to integrate Goans into the Indian Union. Prime Minister Jawarlal Nehru had in 1954 promised to Goans that it is in the interest of the Indian Nation that Portuguese must go and that Goans will not be brought into the Indian Union through Coercion. At an emergency UNSC meet on 18 December 1961, to discuss the Goan crisis, a resolution seeking the withdrawal of the Indian forces out of Goa, was vetoed by the USSR, despite getting majority votes. That night, Mr. C. S. Jha, the Indian Ambassador to the United Nations conceded that it is now the time for all the UN resolutions pertaining to de-colonized territories to come into play. The UNO General Assembly had already adopted a resolution 1514 (XV) of 14 December 1960 on the granting of Independence to Colonial Countries and Peoples. But instead holding an exercise of self-determination monitored under the UN, the Indian Election Commission and the Military government in control over Goa held the first, Legislative Assembly elections in 1963. Goa is probably the only decolonized territory which was deprived of having a plebiscite. Goan's always wanted a unique identity from India. They uniquely participated in the decolonization from Portugal, following decolonization did not want the merger of then union territory of Goa with Maharashtra through opinion poll subsequently asked for statehood of Goa, and continue to work towards the recognition of Roman script for Konkani.

== Early 20th century ==
The abolition of the Portuguese monarchy in 1910 raised hopes that the colonies would be granted self-determination; however, when Portuguese colonial policies remained unchanged, an organised and dedicated freedom movement emerged. Luís de Menezes Bragança founded O Heraldo, the first Portuguese language newspaper in Goa, which was critical of Portuguese colonial rule. In 1917, the "Carta Organica" law was passed, overseeing all civil liberties in Goa.

In reaction to growing dissent, the Portuguese government in Goa implemented policies which curtailed civil liberties, including censorship of the press. Strict censorship policies required any material containing printed words, including invitation cards, to be submitted to a censorship committee for screening. The Portuguese governor of Goa was empowered to suspend publication, close down printing presses and impose heavy fines on newspapers which refused to comply with these policies. Many Goans criticised the curtailing of press freedoms, stating that the only newspapers and periodicals the Portuguese permitted them to publish were pro-colonialist propaganda materials.

== Goa's Opinion Poll ==
The Goa Opinion Poll was a referendum held in the state of Goa, India, on 16 January 1967, to decide the future of the Union Territory of Goa, Daman and Diu within the Indian Union. Although popularly called an opinion poll, it was in fact, a referendum, as the results of the poll were binding on the government of India. The referendum offered the people of Goa a choice between continuing as a union territory or merging with the state of Maharashtra. It is the only referendum to have been held in independent India. The people of Goa voted against the merger and Goa continued to be a union territory. Subsequently, in 1987, Goa became a full-fledged state within the Indian Union.

== Goa Statehood ==
Dr. Jack de Sequeira was the founder president of the United Goans Party. He played a pivotal role in convincing the government of India to hold an opinion poll to decide the issue of the merger of Goa into the state of Maharashtra

== Movement for official recognition of Romi Konkani ==
Recently, there has been a renewed surge in the support for Romi Konkani and in the demand for official recognition for the Roman script alongside the Devanagari script. Some examples of this are the growing online readership for Vauraddeancho Ixtt and several groups and pages on social networking website Facebook, in support of Romi Konkani. The critics of sole recognition of Devanagri script contend that Antruz dialect is unintelligible to most Goans, let alone other Konkanis, and that Devanagari is used very little as compared to Roman script in Goa or Kannada script in coastal Karnataka Prominent among the critics are Konkani Catholics in Goa, who have been at the forefront of the Konkani agitation in 1986–87 and have for long used the Roman script including producing literature in Roman script. They are demanding that Roman script be given equal status to Devanagari. Tiatr artists and tiatr aficionados are another group which supports Romi konkani. It is argued that giving official recognition to Romi Konkani will help strengthen the language by creating an inclusive environment for users of the Roman script and also to the Christian community of Goa. It will avoid people who have difficulty in using the Devanagari script or don't know the Devanagari script from feeling alienated and giving up on the language. Romi konkani is almost the only flavour of the Konkani language present on the internet. It is also the most convenient script for use with computers.

There have been three state-level Literary and Cultural conventions of Konkani in the Roman Script (Romi Lipi Konkani Sahitya ani Sonvskrutik Sommelan) held in 2008, February 2010 and February 2011 in Goa.

However, the criticism against official recognition of Konkani in the Roman Script is that having more than one official script for Konkani will lead to fragmentation of Konkani.

== Historical Facts Related to demands ==
- As part of Hindu culture, the spiritual practices differ from region to region in the country, the Konkan region similarly followed various spiritual practices ranging from idols and universal Dharmic spirituality.
- Many of the community owned lands have been encroached by petty thieves who are politically motivated for vote bank politics.
- Most of the electoral roll members are migrants from neighbouring states and migrant labourers who have been provided voting rights unconstitutionally.
- Goans used Indian languages like Sanskrit and Konkani throughout known history just like rest of India and do not discriminate based on spiritual practices, language or skin colour.
- The simple Goans preferred the Portuguese as cultural partners due to their simplicity and organised methods of governance and helping to improve the Hindu Culture and environment to the best of their ability with good values. However as a political democratic model was trending globally, very few Goans who fell prey to political and business interests from outside the state for personal profits and other benefits Goa liberation movement.
- The Portuguese have preserved ancient best-practice systems that existed as part of the Hindu Culture pre-colonial rule many of these have been documented in the Portuguese language.
- The Portuguese were the first to record Konkani formally in Romi script prior to which it was not formally scripted and was conveyed mostly by speech. However Konkani is taught in present day schools in Deva-Nagari script. Goans today have exposure to both Romi Script and Deva-Nagari script in written form.
- The Goans display disappointment with any anti-cultural government who do not give preference to genuine konkani speaking locals in government positions and majority of these positions are occupied by employees whose mother tongue or first language is not Konkani. Many proactive Goans thus have chosen to migrate by selling their properties (which is causing a cultural and intellectual drain), locally venture into arts and business or work in private firms which goes against the cultural preservation ideals of India.
- Many of the politicians elected to the government simultaneously run or influence major corporations and thus taking advantage of the peaceful Hindu-Goan culture, have legalised "black money" laundering through casinos and other anti-cultural activities like real-estate by non-local firms and deforestation with no regard for the environment despite signing international climate agreements with commitments to protect the environment. This goes completely against ancient Hindu Dharmic values and the culture appreciated and safeguarded by good-willed colonists.

== Benefits of Special Status ==
- It is claimed that by outlawing land sale to non-Goans, the inward migration will reduce.
- Create conditions where Goa's unique culture and identity will thrive and grow.
- Lower prices and better quality of life for Goans as the demand for homes, schools, roads, hospitals from Non Goans will be less.
- Reduction in cross border Crime and Lawlessness.
- Romi Konkani will thrive.
- Goa and Goan can live together without outside interference

== Progress of the Special Status demand ==
- The Goa Legislative Assembly passed a resolution requesting the Government of India to accede to Goa's request for Special Status.
- The Chief Minister of Goa apprised the Prime Minister of India of the growing demand among Goans that Goa be granted Special Status under the Constitution of India.
- There have been various organization fighting for the Special Status of Goa.
1. The Late Mathany Saldanha started the Goa Movement for Special Status as a citizens movement to further the demand for Special Status.
2. The Movement for special status for Goa, is another organization fighting for the Special Status.

== Hindrances of the Special Status demand ==
- Lack of political will from the Government of India due to small representation of Goa in the Indian Parliament (2 Members of Parliament)
- Large-scale business interests for the exploitation of Goa's land resources.
- General disarray of people movements.
- Strong opposition from Native Goan land owners who oppose the restriction on their private property rights.

== Arguments and myths against Special Status ==
- Indian Government found the special status demand unjustifiable. As many of the politicians and corporates have purchased and invested in land in Goa and alongside the Bollywood industry prefer to perceive and market the idea of Goa as a "sin city" (for low grade tourism and capitalise on the created circumstances monetarily) due to the privacy and tolerance in the streets of Goa. Most of these community owned lands are illegally purchased through manipulated and forged documents and PoA's (Power of Attorney) and by unchanging law of the land stand as illegal or stolen possessions.
- The politicians and businessmen alongside fanatics promote the ongoing theory that Special Status is a religious Christian demand to isolate Goa from India.
- Myth - Economists argue that this may create a disaster for Goa as it has been for Kashmir. Goans believe that the currency value of the Indian Rupee is low due to corruption in political governance and various politically influenced corporations. If economists were to measure Goa's economy independently, they would find that Goa is a self-sustaining state with well-balanced natural and intellectual resources. Goan's do not claim superiority but merely ask for special status because without it, a beautiful state like Goa is susceptible to cultural adulteration and corruption through opportunistic political and corporate outfits.
- Some people suspect this is a conspiracy of left leaning intellectuals to limit private property rights of native Goans. Unfortunately these suspecting "intellectuals" do not respect private nor public property rights in the region with the endorsement of the local politicians.
- The belief that demand for Goan land will reduce and lower prices could be fallacious. Special status will also significantly reduce the private investment in Goa, private enterprise and hence supply of most common products and services people generally take for Granted. But this may not be a valid deduction as the economic model followed by most of the political elements in power is fallacious as it has been proved to drain out near outrageous monetary resources into unaccounted wealth commonly known by its street term "black money" as despite efforts of de-monetisation, politicians have been distributing sums of money for votes even during the most recent grass-root level Panchayat elections, which could question the media published credibility and source of the monetary governance model for measuring the economy.
- Special status will result in disproportionate advantage to religion based vote banks and their handlers as it happened in Kashmir. Goans and hopefully every decent human being are more cultural than religious in this age.
