= Mussoll =

Folk dance from Goa, India

Mussoll (literally pestle) or Mussllam khell is a historic folk dance performed in the state of Goa, India. The dance is preserved in the village of Chandor, located in the Salcete region. Performers hold pestles (musall) while executing the dance, which incorporates historical themes and local traditions.

== History ==
Chandor, originally known as Chandrapur, served as the historic capital of the Kadamba dynasty. Differing views exist regarding the origins and historical associations of the dance. According to one perspective, King Harihara I of the Vijayanagara Empire conquered the Chandrapur fort from a Chola ruler and performed this dance in 1390 to celebrate his victory. Another viewpoint holds that the compositions accompanying the dance originated during the Satavahana dynasty era, with subsequent rulers adding praise hymns to the original songs. The dance also serves as an artistic commemoration of the destruction of the Yadav dynasty by pestles, while simultaneously honoring the memory of the Kadamba period.

== Performance and rituals ==
Historically performed during the festival of Shigmo, Mussol is now presented on the second day of the Goa Carnival in February.

The presentation follows a structured routine and specific locations. Performances take place in front of temples, house yards of Gaonkars and Kshatriyas, and across individual village residences. The ritual begins at a former Shiva temple that was converted into a church during a period of religious conversions. Performers organize into two rows and step forward to a specific beat while carrying pestles. They are accompanied by a participant wearing a bear costume, whose neck leash is held by a lead dancer. In front of the church, the dancers form a circle and move their pestles in and out of the ring, simulating a grain-pounding motion. Torchbearers (divtekar) and other participants dance alongside to the rhythm. Once the dance near the church ends, a Devadasi girl sweeps the ground where the pounding took place. Following this ceremony, the troupe visits individual houses throughout the village to perform.

== Costume ==
Performers wear a traditional ensemble consisting of a dhoti, a long-sleeved shirt, a specialized black jacket worn over the shirt and a turban (pagdi) as headwear. The lead dancer wears attire distinct from the rest of the troupe.

== Instruments and props ==
The central prop, the pestle (musall) features holes drilled into its middle section fitted with internal metal blades or bells to produce a jingling sound during movement. Musical backing is provided by traditional instruments including the Ghumot, Kansaalle (or Jhanjh), and the Dholke.

== Music and oral tradition ==
The songs rendered during the Mussol dance exist strictly as an oral tradition and are not recorded in written form. Comprehensive analytical study is required to fully decode and interpret the complete meanings of these traditional compositions.
