= Cabidela =

Portuguese dish made with poultry

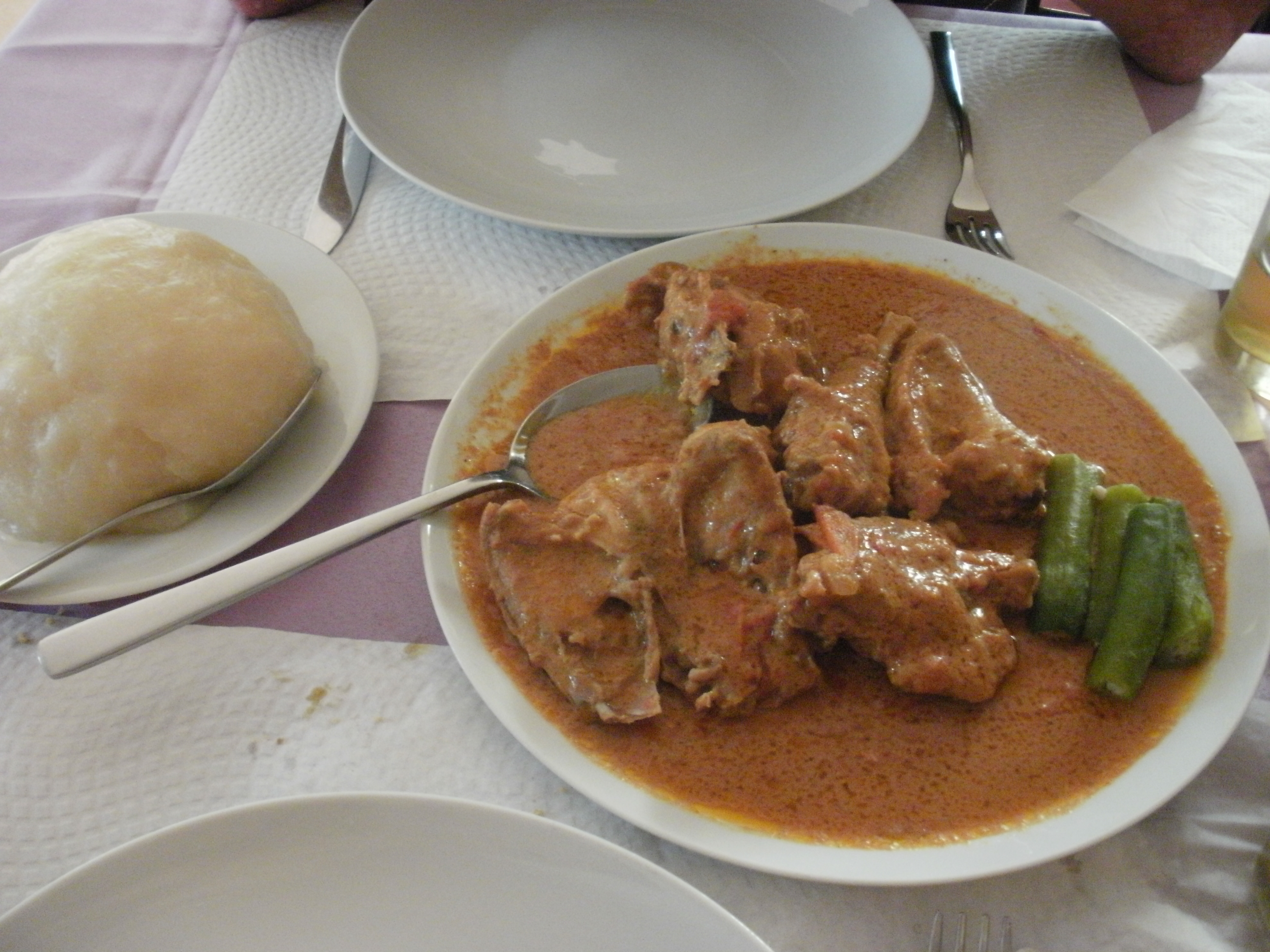
Chicken cabidela

Cabidela (Portuguese pronunciation: [kɐβiˈðɛlɐ]) or arroz de cabidela (cabidela rice) is a Portuguese dish made with poultry, usually a rooster (male chicken). It is typical of the northern Minho region. The particularity of the dish is that the hen's blood is added almost at the end, mixed with vinegar (to prevent clotting) while the rice is boiling, much like "jugged" or "civet" dishes. The blood is captured when the animal is slaughtered and imparts a brown color to the dish. Occasionally, white rice can be served with the dish, although this is not common. Cooking with blood is an antique custom common to several ancient cultures; in Portugal, cabidela has been in the written record since the 16th century and may be prepared as well with other fowl or animals (duck, turkey, pork, kid or game), though this is rare.

== Variants ==
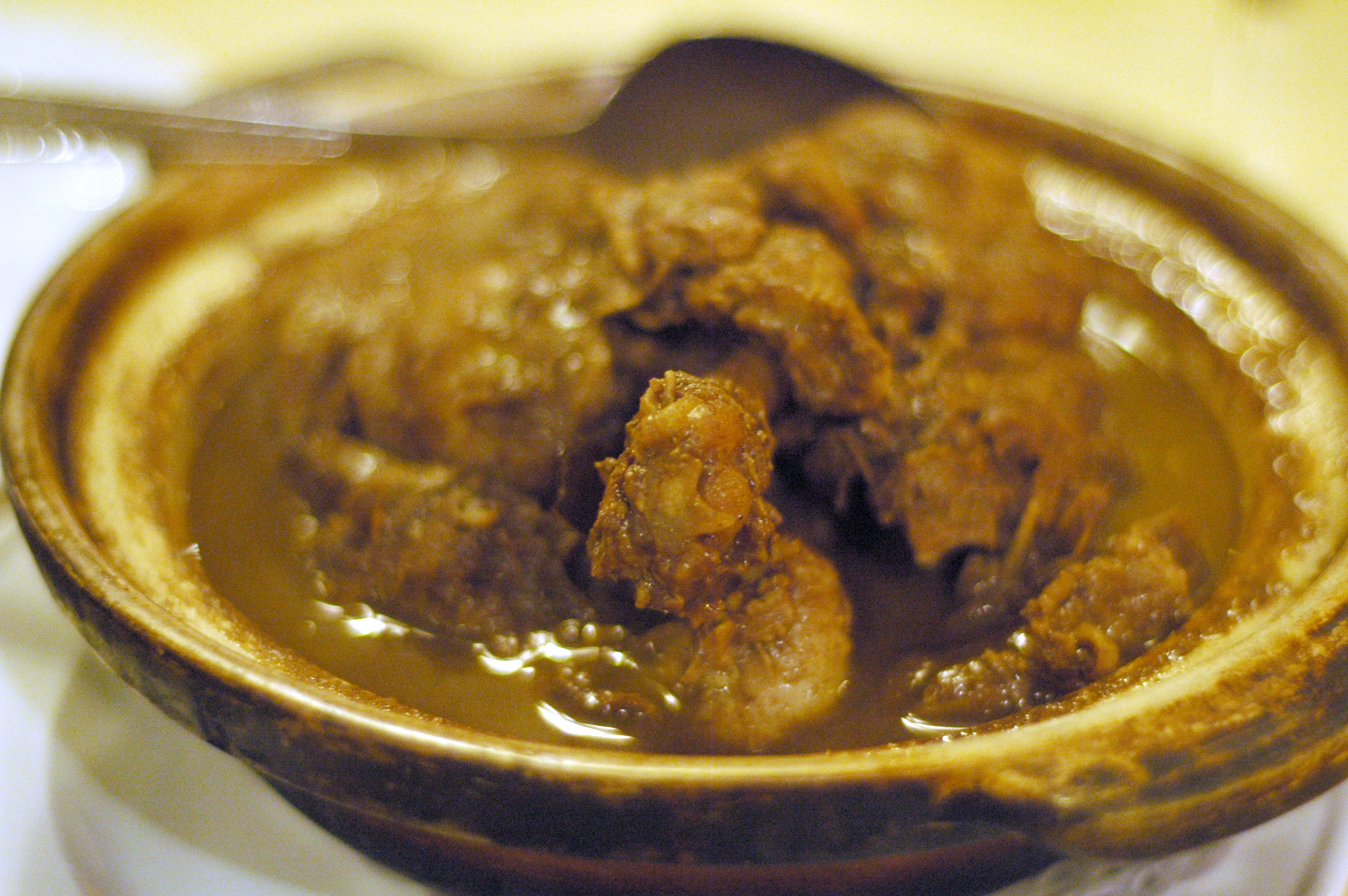
Pato de cabidela, Macau's version with duck

Variations on the dish are also found in many of Portugal's former colonies, such as Macau, where a similar dish made with duck (pato de cabidela or pato à cabidela) is one of the best-known dishes in Macanese cuisine.

In Brazil, this dish is normally made with chicken (galinha à cabidela or galinha de cabidela), and is considered a typical dish of the city of Recife. The rice is cooked separately. It is also a very common dish in the state of Minas Gerais, where it has the name galinha ao molho pardo. It is also common to cook only the chicken's blood, with vinegar and vegetables, until it becomes a sauce that can be added to rice or to the cooked chicken itself.

In India, pork cabidela is popular among the Catholic community of Goa.

The chicken version is one of the most common dishes served on special occasions while it is also found in restaurants in Angola.

== See also ==
- Dinuguan
- Sarapatel
