= Godshem =

Indian dessert

Godshem, also spelled Godshe, is a pudding or sweet porridge prepared in Goa, India. The dish has several variations, and its name means "sweetness" in Konkani, where it is sometimes used as a general term for dessert. Godshem may be prepared using ingredients such as rice, lentils, mung beans, milk, coconut, nuts, ghee, jaggery, and sugar. Some versions also incorporate fruits or gourds.

Godshem is commonly prepared and served during local festivals and community celebrations across Goa, including church feasts, Dussehra, and harvest festivals. It is also served at village celebrations such as the Vangodd festival in Saligão, the pre-Lenten Potekar festival in Divar Island, and Intruz in Dongrim village. In addition to religious and seasonal festivals, the dish is frequently prepared for community gatherings and cultural events, including those organised by Goan diaspora communities outside the region.
