= Cafreal =

Spicy chicken dish popular in Goa, India

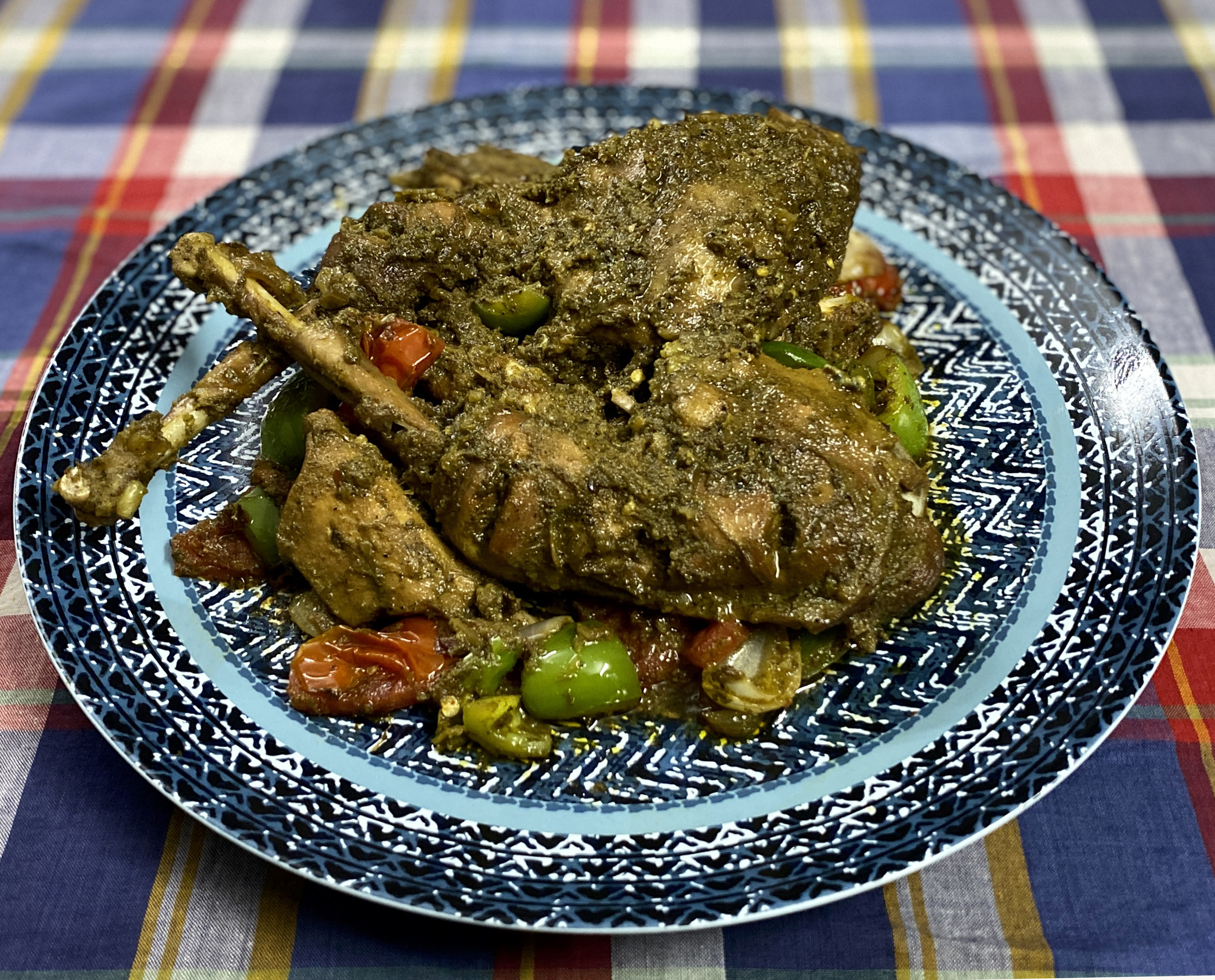
- A guinea fowl cafreal served on a bed of vegetables.
- Place of origin: India, Portuguese India
- Region or state: Goa
- Serving temperature: Warm
- Main ingredients: Fowl (Chicken, originally Guinea Fowl), fresh coriander leaves, pepper

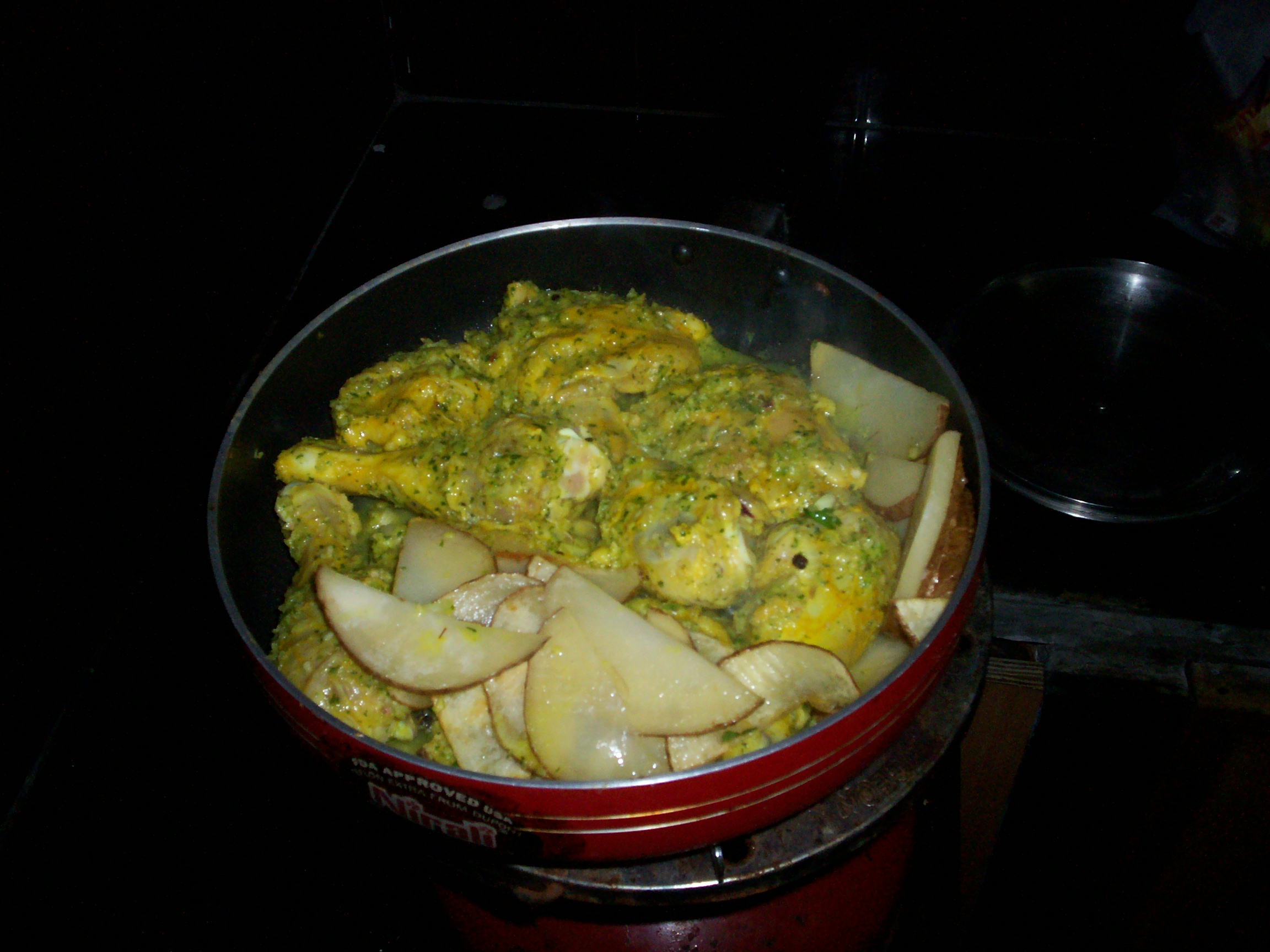
Cafreal simmering on a stove

Frango à Cafreal is a poultry preparation consumed widely in the Indian state of Goa, formerly part of Portuguese India. The preparation originated from the Portuguese colonies in the African continent. It was introduced into Goan cuisine by the Portuguese and the African soldiers serving under the Portuguese.

Originally made with guinea fowls in the past, the generic preparation involves chicken, green chillies, fresh coriander leaves, onion, garlic, ginger, cinnamon, pepper, chilli, mace, clove powder and lime juice or vinegar. Chicken cafreal is always made from whole chicken legs, flavoured with the spices and herbs mentioned and then shallow fried. Cafreal is usually accompanied by potato wedges and lime wedges. It is a popular dish in the bars and taverns of the state.

It is suspected that the dish originated in the Portuguese colonies in Africa, most likely in Mozambique. "À Cafreal" means "in the way of the Cafres" and cafre was the designation of the inhabitants of Kaffraria, the region of Southern Africa inhabited by non-Muslim peoples (kafir). According to this hypothesis, the cafreal chicken derives from the piri-piri chicken typical of those places. In many contexts and locations in the world, chicken piri-piri and chicken cafreal designate the same dish, but in Goa they are two very different things, even in colour, since the first is red.
