= Sarapatel =

Portuguese ingredient mix

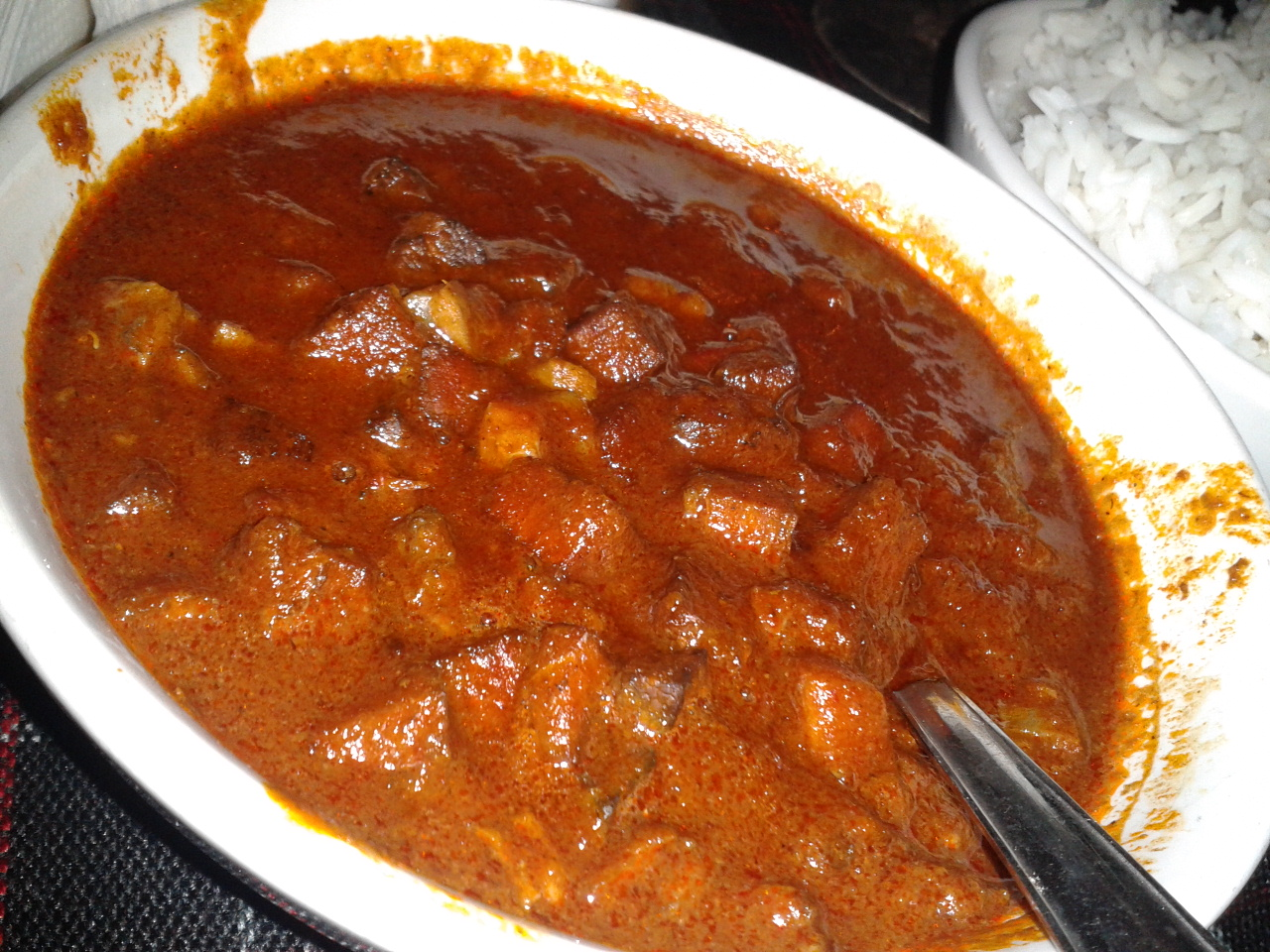
- A "sorpotel" from a restaurant in Goa.
- Place of origin: India, Portugal
- Region or state: Goa

Sarapatel (Portuguese pronunciation: [sɐɾɐpɐˈtɛl], Brazilian Portuguese: [sɐɾɐpɐˈtɛw]), or sorpotel is a dish of Portuguese origin now commonly cooked in the Konkan—primarily Goa, Mangalore, and Bombay—the erstwhile Estado da Índia Portuguesa colony. What came to India was the version popular from Alentejo region of Portugal, to which the native Goan Christians and East Indians added their own flavors. It is also prepared in northeastern Brazil. The word "Sarapatel" literally means "confusion", referring to the mish-mash of ingredients which include pork meat and offal (which includes heart, liver, tongue, and even pork blood sometimes). However, blood is rarely used in the modern-day version since pure blood is difficult to acquire. The meat is first parboiled, then diced and sauteed before being cooked in a spicy and vinegary sauce.

The flavourings and spices differ from region to region, for example, some use more vinegar. The size of the pieces also varies, as does cooking technique: some sauté the meat prior to cooking it in the sauce, while others add the diced parboiled meat directly to the sauce.

In Goa and Mangalore, sorpotel is often accompanied by "Sanna"—a spongy, white, and slightly sweet steamed rice and coconut bread. However, it can also be eaten with Pão, on cooked rice, or in a bun as a sandwich.

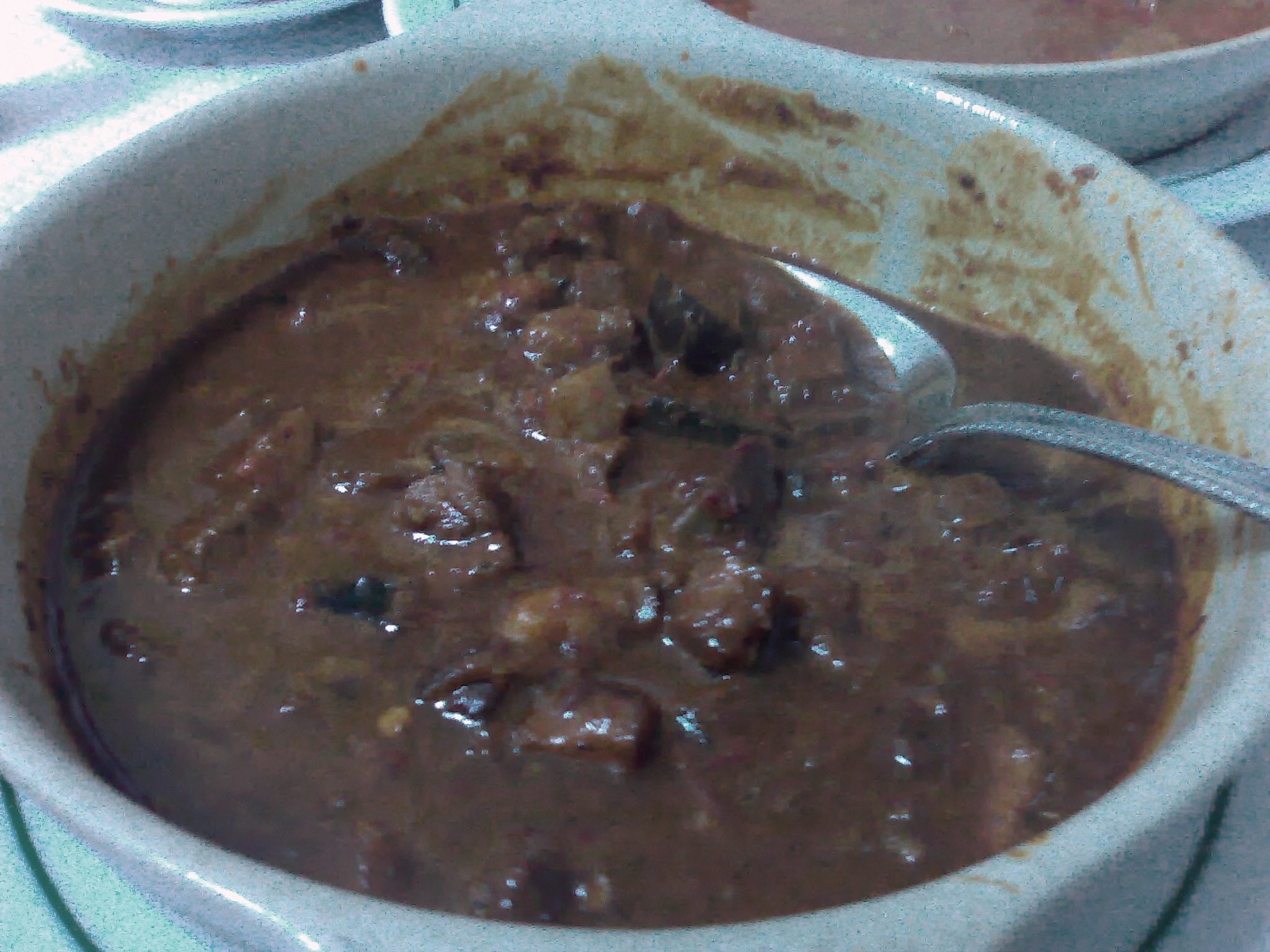
Portugal's "Sarapatel", served at a restaurant in Algés.

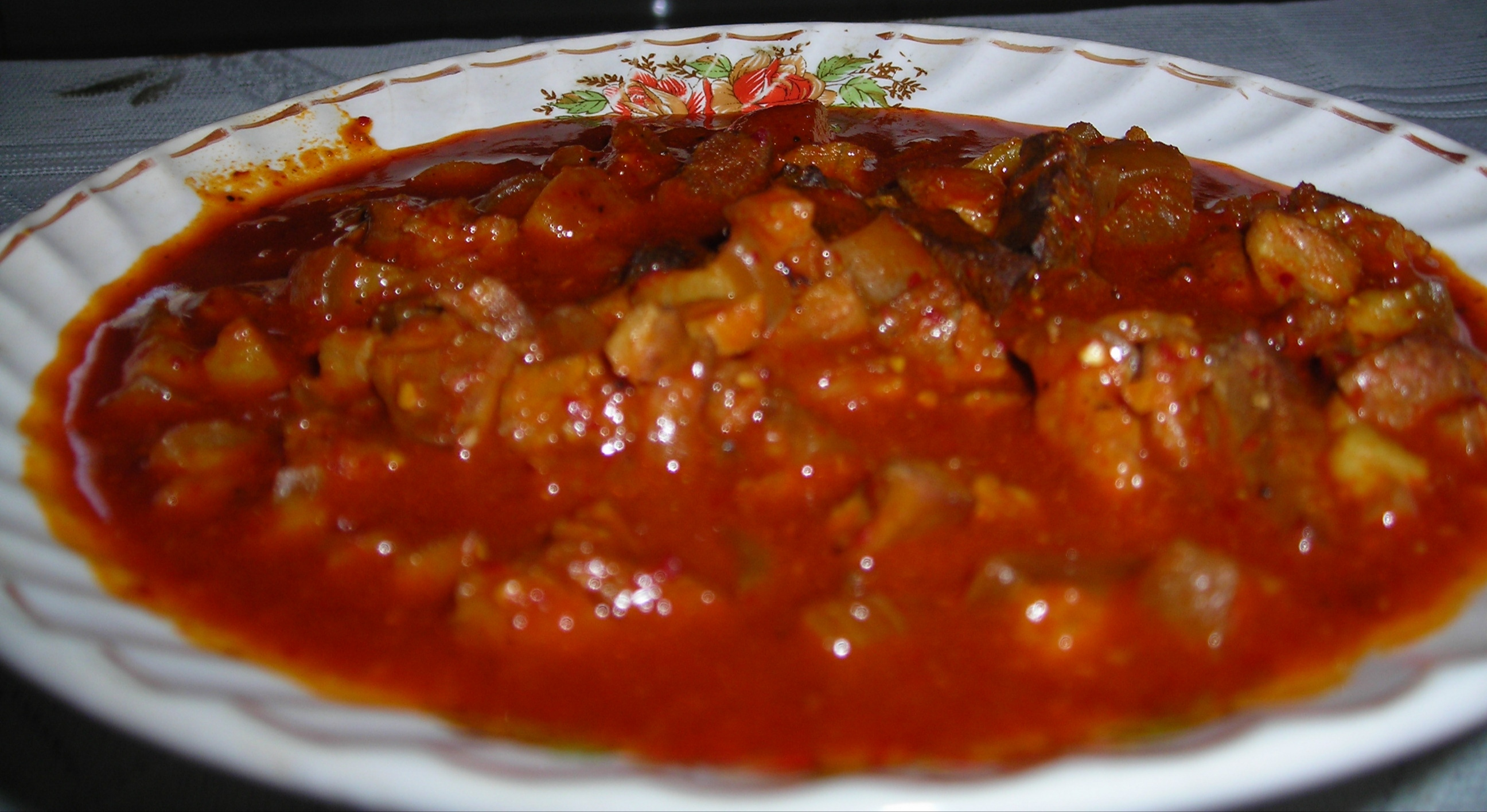
Goa's homestyle "Sorpotel", a picquant pork gravy

== See also ==
- Cabidela
- Dinuguan
