= Achappam =

Deep fried cookie made with rice flour and other indredients

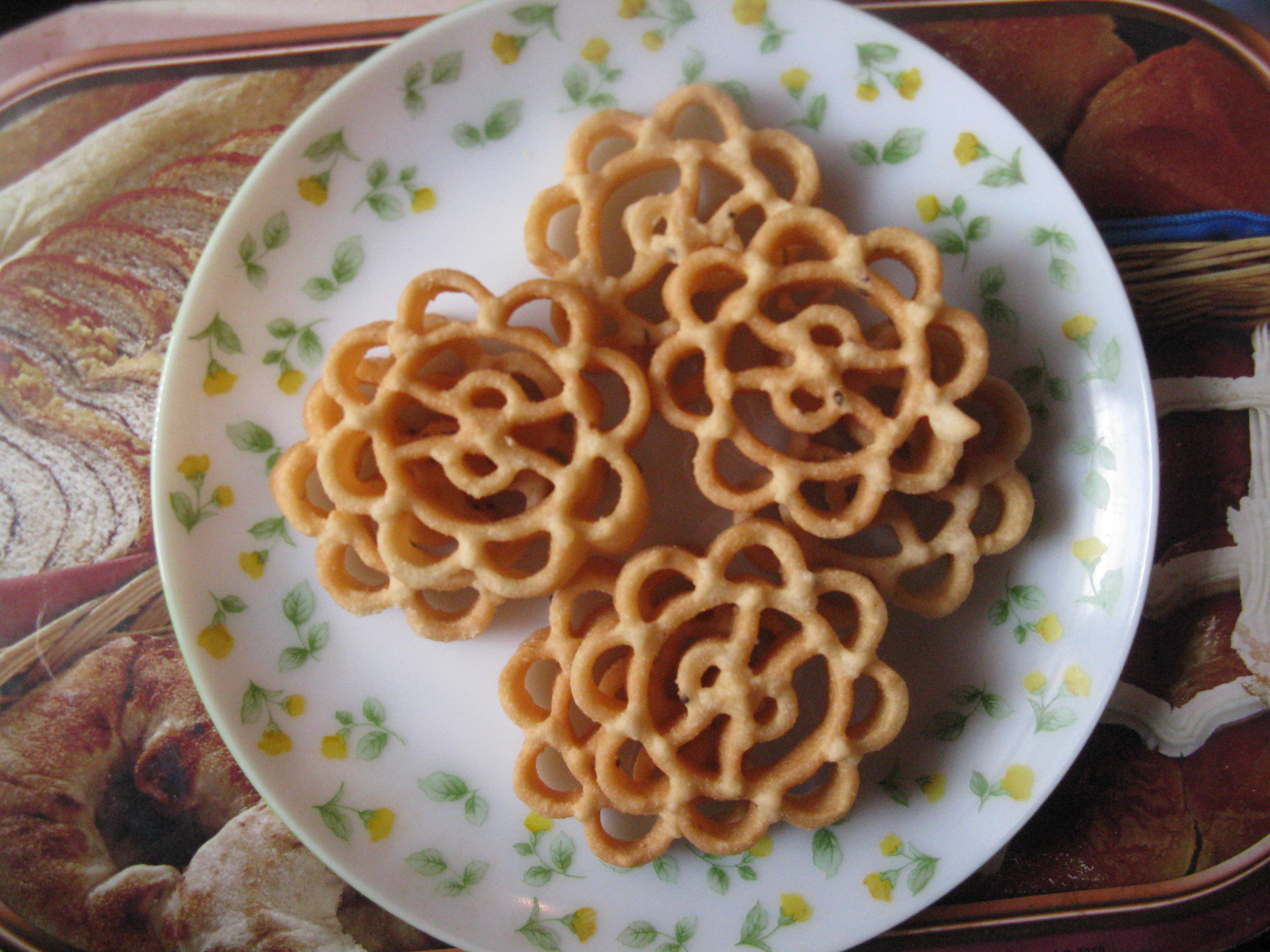
- Type: Cookie, Waffle
- Region or state: Kerala
- Cooking time: 45 minutes to 60 minutes
- Main ingredients: Rice flour
- Ingredients generally used: Egg, Coconut milk, Sesame seeds
- Food energy (per 100 g serving): 634 kcal (2,650 kJ)
- Similar dishes: Rosette (cookie)

An achappam (achh meaning mould in Malayalam, and appam meaning food made with flour) or achu murukku (murukku meaning a crunchy snack in Tamil) is a lightly sweetened, deep fried rose cookie made with rice flour, coconut milk, sugar and egg, predominantly found in Kerala and other parts of South India. It is a signature Kerala snack believed to have originated from Dutch influence. It has since spread to South East Asia, where it has various local names such as kuih loyang (brass), acuan (mould), cap (stamp), bunga ros (rose flower), bunga durian (durian flower), goyang (shake), kembang loyang, dok jok (water lettuce), etc. Rose cookies are shaped like flowers, slightly sweet crunchy, and available in teashops and snack shops all around South India.

== Preparation ==
Achappam are made using patterned irons or moulds to give the characteristic size, shape, and surface impression. The iron is heated to a very high temperature in oil, dipped into the batter, then re-immersed in the hot oil to create a crisp shell around the metal. The iron is lifted from the oil after the cookie separates from the iron.

Achappam batter is made from a blend of rice flour, eggs, sugar, and coconut milk.

Achappam can be eaten plain and are also commonly spiced with sesame, cumin, and cardamom.

== Related dishes ==
Achappam belongs to a family of moulded, rose-shaped fried cookies found in several cuisines. Close relatives include the kokis of Sri Lanka, which is also traced to Dutch influence, the Iranian nan-e panjerei, the gulabi puvvulu of Andhra Pradesh, and the Scandinavian rosette.

== Christmas ==
In Kerala, achappam is closely tied to Christmas, when Christian families prepare it as a festive snack alongside items such as kalkal and kuzhalappam.

== See also ==
- Appam
- Kokis
- List of fried dough varieties
- Struva / Rosette
- Kembang goyang
