= Mangalorean Catholic cuisine =

Type of South Indian cuisine

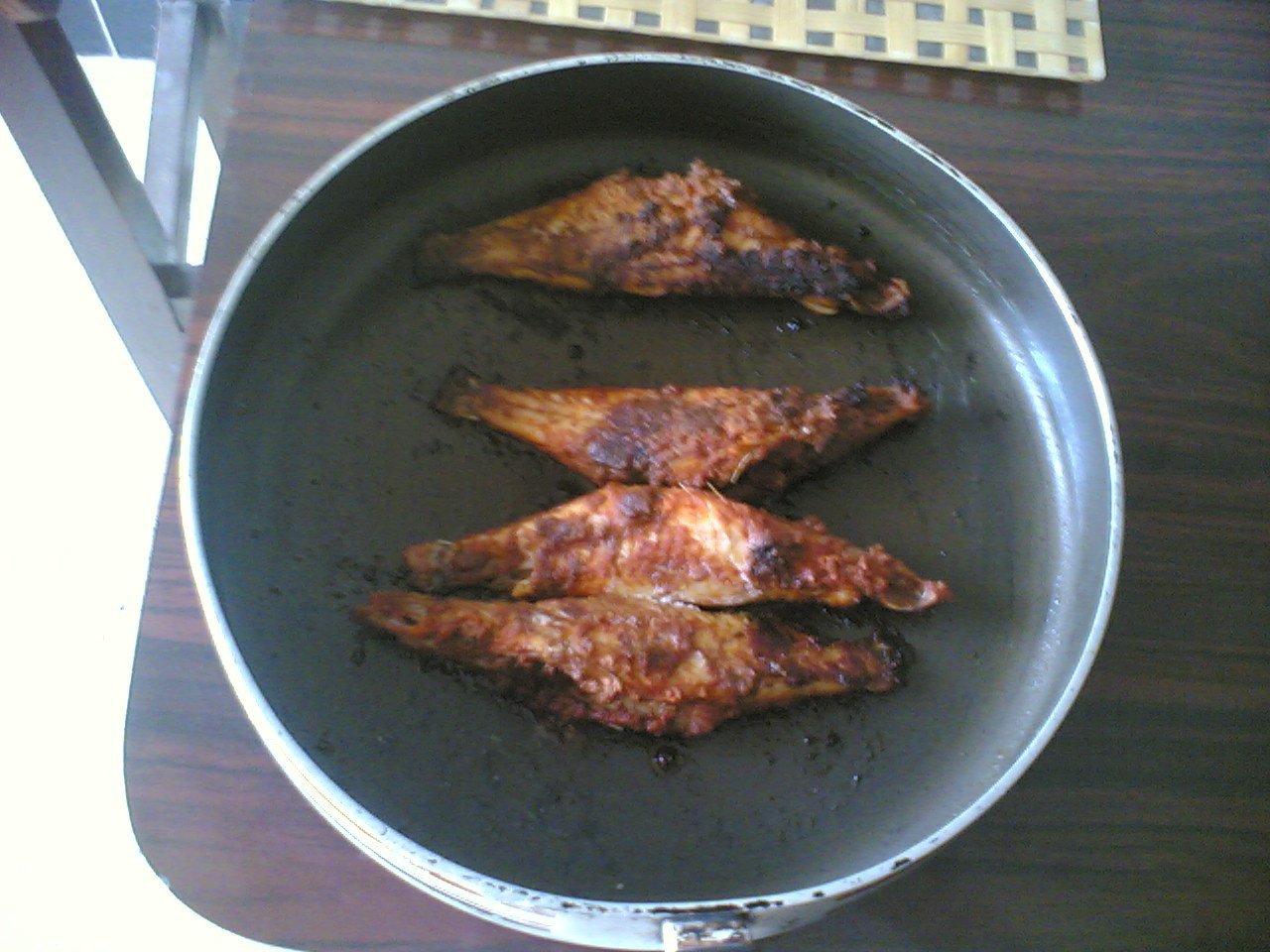
Pan fried fish in Mangalorean Catholic style

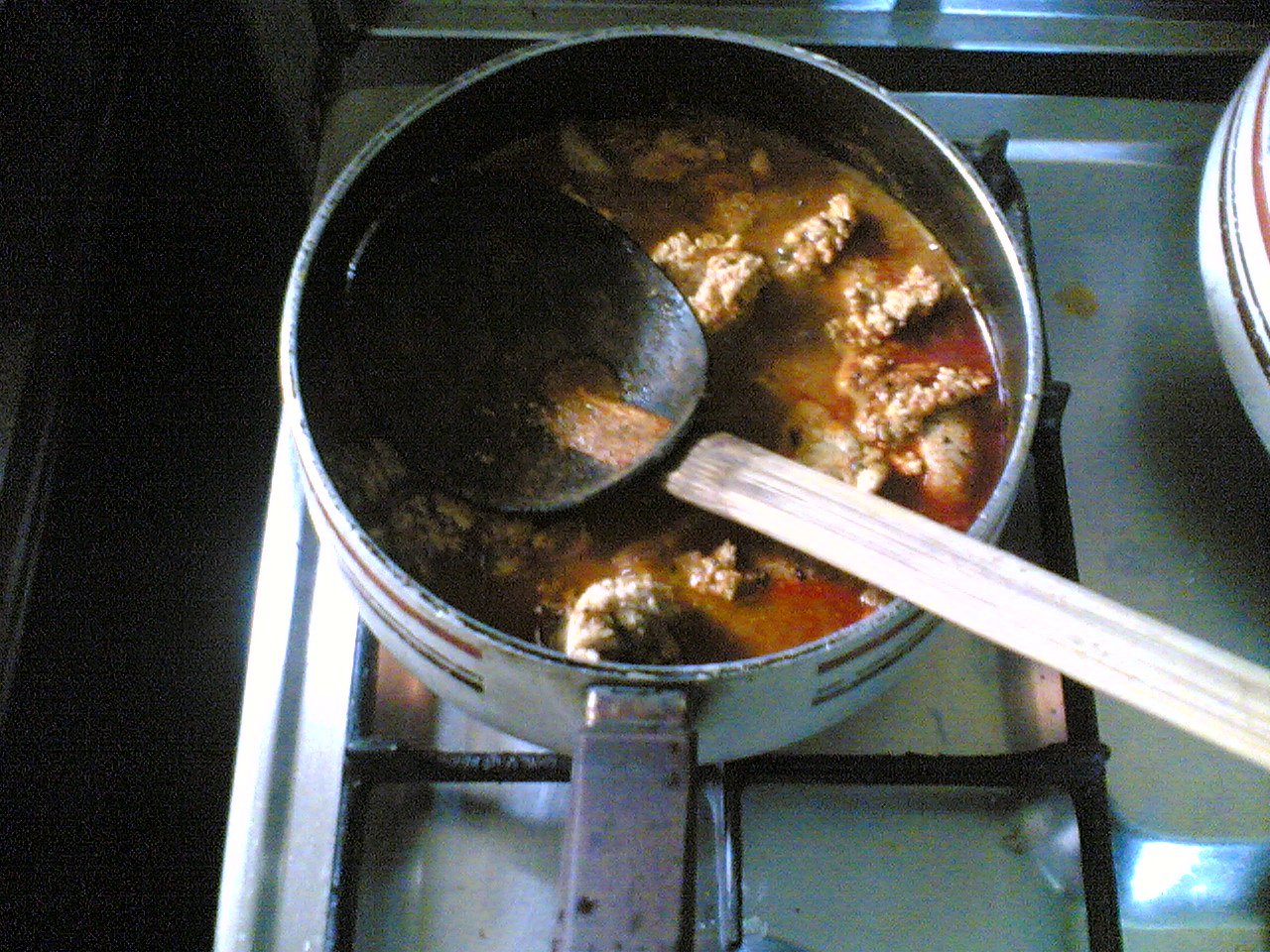
Roe fish curry in Mangalorean Catholic style

Mangalorean Catholic cuisine is the cuisine of the Mangalorean Catholic community which is an important aspect of the culture of Mangalorean Catholics.

Mangalorean Catholics are Catholic Christians from Mangalore and the rest of the historical South Canara area by the southern coast of present-day Karnataka, India. Most Mangalorean Catholics share ancestry with Goan Catholics, as they migrated from Portuguese Goa to the Keladi Kingdom, between 1560 and 1763, following their Christianisation. The migrations continued during the Portuguese Inquisition, the Mahratta Invasion of Goa and Bombay etc. After their migrations, they adopted some aspects of local Mangalorean culture, but also retained some elements of their Konkani way of life.

== Non-vegetarian cuisine ==
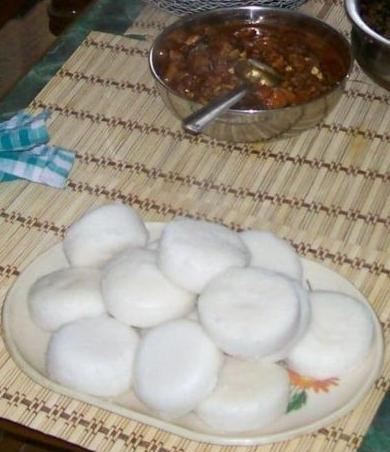
Sanna–Dukra Maas

Their curry uses a lot of coconut and curry leaves while ginger, garlic and chilli are also used. Mangalorean Catholic cuisine has distinct Portuguese influence as can be seen in Laitao, the famous Pork Bafat served as the Pièce de résistance at wedding dinners, and Pork Sorpotel. Fabled cooks like Davidam or Alicebai were called in to help with the repast. Mangalorean Catholics mix pork blood and other parts in most of their pork delicacies as can be seen from Pork Bafat, Cabidela and Pork Kaliz Unkiti (heart and intestines). Sanna–Dukra Maas (Sanna – idli fluffed with toddy or yeast; Dukra Maas – Pork) is an inventive made from the leavened bread called sanna. Chicken Indaz is also popular. The traditional Rosachi kadi (Ros Curry), a curry made with ros (coconut milk) with chicken, fish or mutton is quite popular and is served during the Ros (anointing) ceremony that is held 1 or 2 days before a Mangalorean Catholic wedding. Their fish curry especially their Fish Roe Curry, is known for its taste in the whole of coastal India while fried fish in their style is well known. The Sheveo and Pathal Bakri (a variant of Kori Rotti) are dry rice flakes dipped in chicken gravy dishes.

== Vegetarian cuisine ==
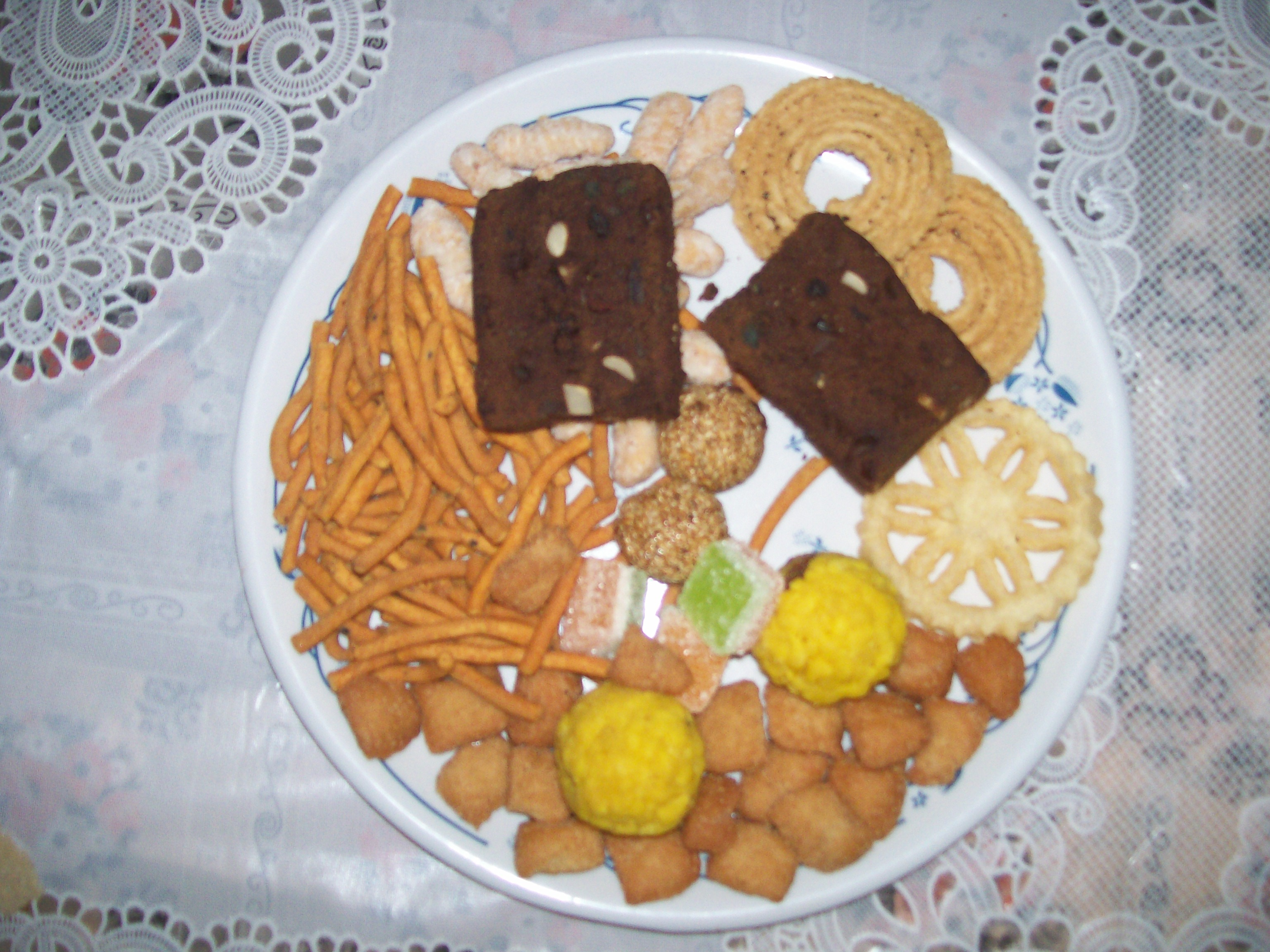
Kuswar

It is customary for Catholic Christians to abstain from meat, during the season of Lent, as a part of the lenten sacrifice.

The "Balthazaar chutney" is a popular condiment. The dish originated when Balthazaar, a Mangalorean Catholic nobleman, was taken prisoner by Tippu Sultan in 1784 during the Captivity of Mangalorean Catholics at Seringapatam. Unable to stomach the indifferent camp food, he offered to make a chutney for the captured Mangalorean Catholics.

The pollu, a type of sambhar with galmbi (powdered dried fish) or kambulmas (dried tuna) is popular. The traditional fode is a popular pickle. Thail piao, which means literally vegetables dumped with oil and onions and left to boil on the fire wood is quite popular. Karamb (cucumber salad) and foka (lady’s finger combined with cashewnuts). The appa and panpole (a type of crepe) are popular delicacies made of soaked rice, water and salt. The thath bakri is a banana leaf rice dish made with ground red boiled rice mixed with raw scraped coconut and roasted on a tava on a banana leaf. The mitais, mandas, ushae, pitae and mani are well known sweet dishes.

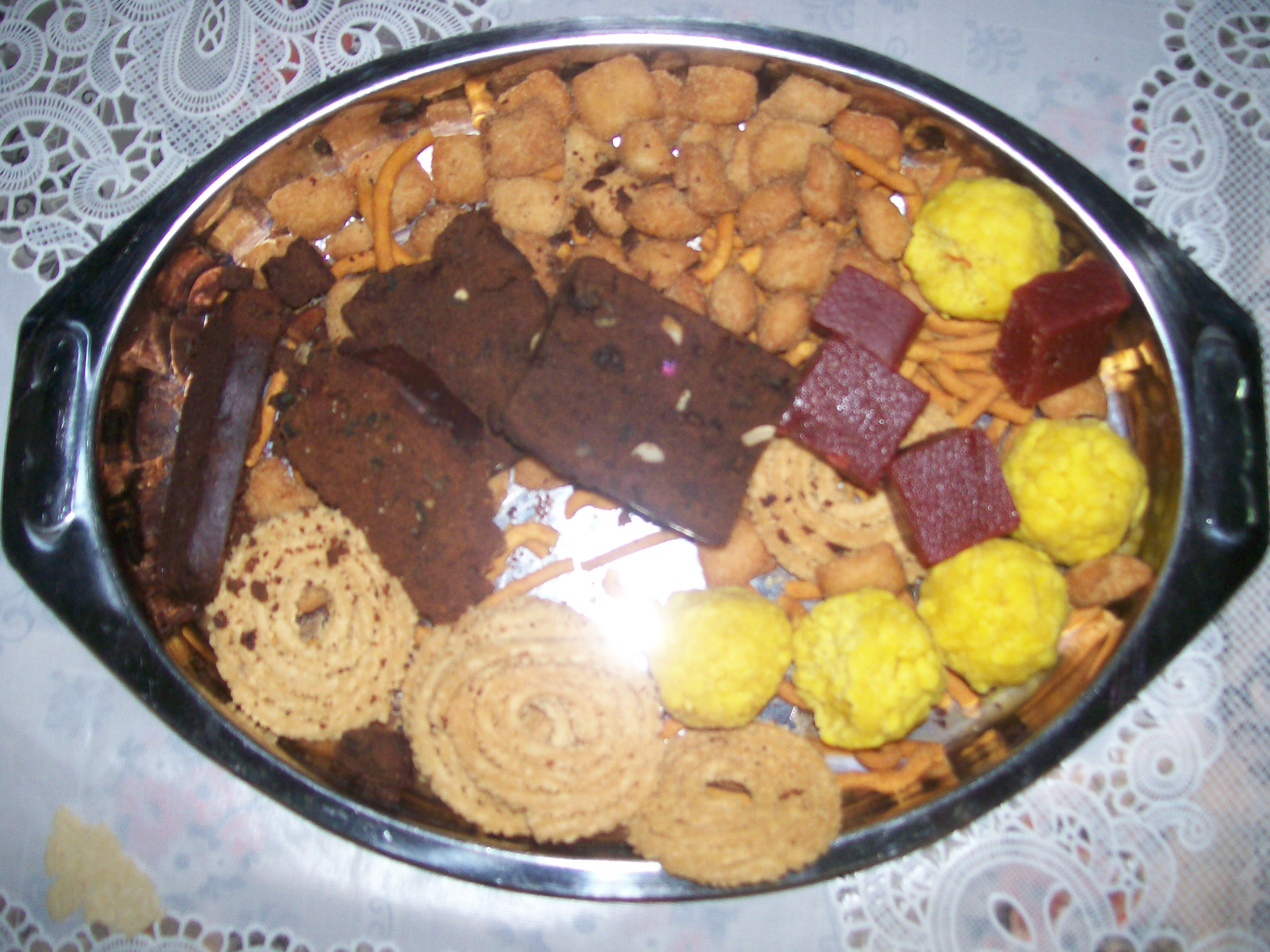
Kuswar

Kuswar is a term used to refer to a set of Christmas goodies which are part of the cuisine of the Mangalorean Catholic community. There are as many as 22 different traditional recipes that are often included. Neuries are puffs stuffed with plums, nuts, and fried theel (sesame) and sugar. Kidyo or kulkuls are curly concoctions dipped in sugar treacle, pathekas are savoury of green nandarkai bananas, theel laddus and gulios. Macaroons, rose cookies, and plum cakes are also common.

Patrode or pathrade, a dish of colocasia leaves stuffed with rice, dal, jaggery, coconut, and spices is also popular. The Mangalorean Catholic version of this steamed delicacy is a slight variation on the Tuluva recipe. More spicy, it is fried in miit mirsang (salt and chilli), a popular condiment used to flavour Mangalorean Catholic dishes.
