= LGBTQ themes in Hindu mythology =

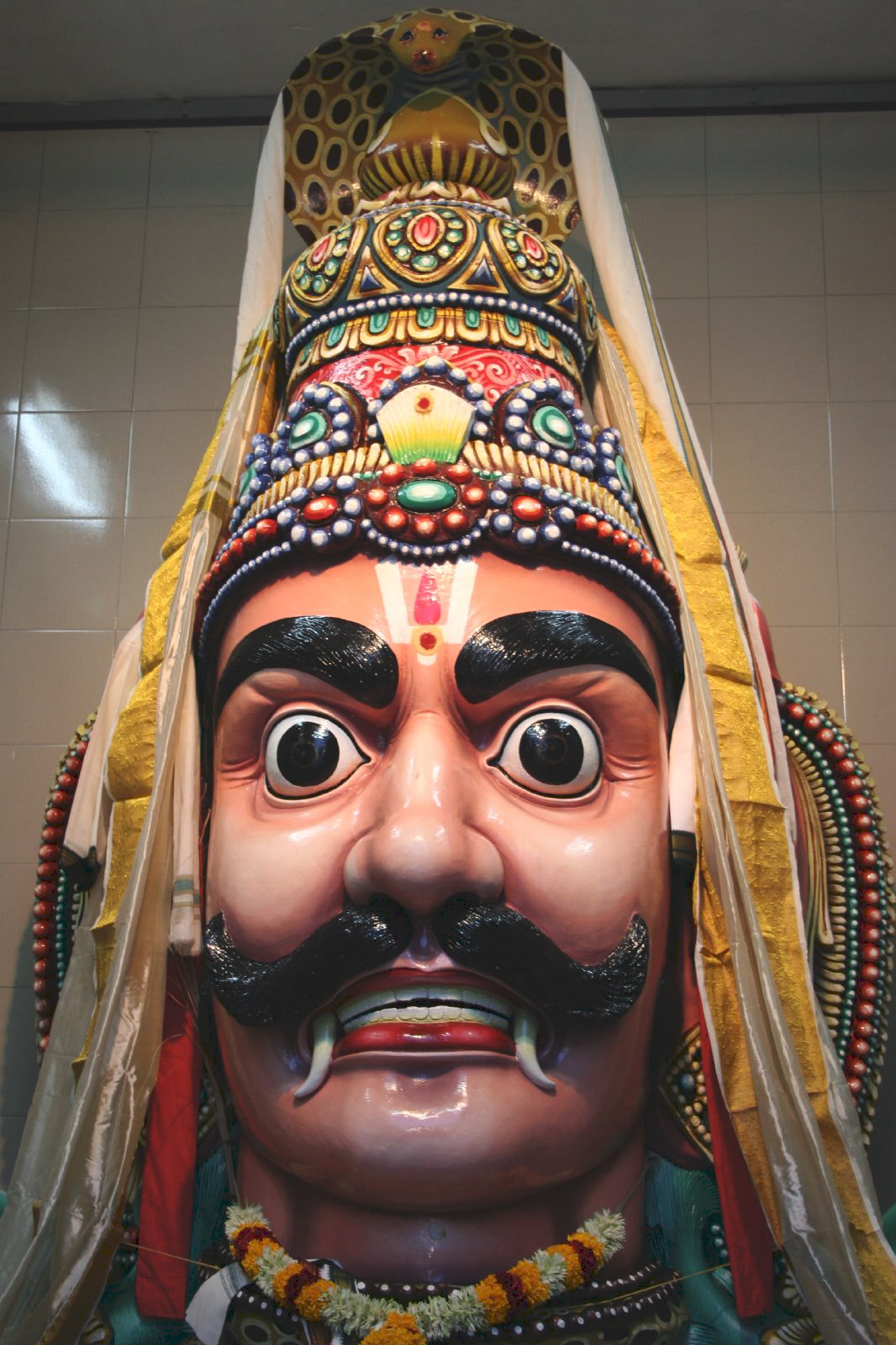
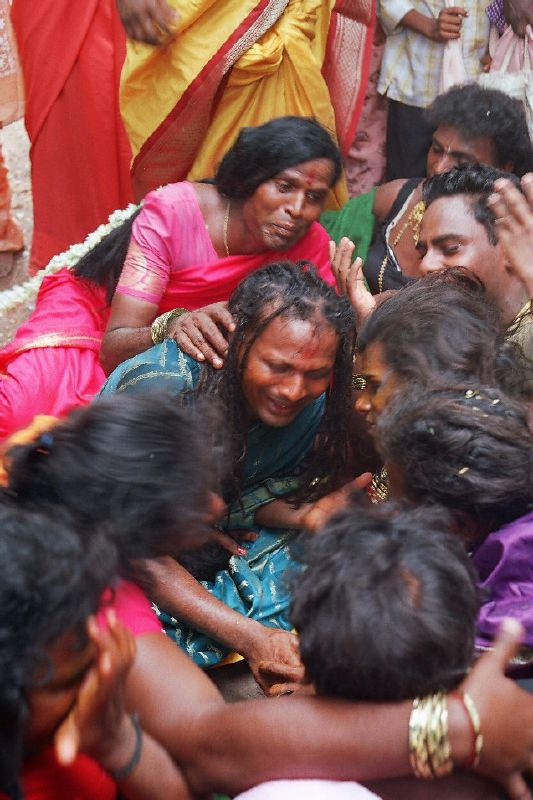
Aravanis (right), the intersex brides of god Aravan (left), mourn his death.

In Hindu mythology, there are deities or heroes whose attributes or behavior can be interpreted as lesbian, gay, bisexual, transgender, or queer (LGBTQ) or have elements of gender variance and non-heterosexual sexuality. Traditional Hindu literary sources do not speak of homosexuality directly, but changes of sex, homoerotic encounters, and intersex or third gender characters are often found both in traditional religious narratives such as the Vedas, Mahabharata, Ramayana and Puranas as well as in regional folklore.

Hindu mythology has many examples of deities changing gender, manifesting as different genders at different times, or combining to form androgynous or hermaphroditic beings. Gods change sex or manifest as an avatar of the opposite sex in order to facilitate sexual congress. Non-divine beings also undergo sex-changes through the actions of the gods, as the result of curses or blessings, or as the natural outcome of reincarnation.

Hindu mythology contains numerous incidents where sexual interactions can serve a sacred religious purpose; in some cases, these are same-sex interactions. Sometimes the gods condemn these interactions but at other times they occur with their blessing.

In addition to stories of gender and sexual variance that are generally accepted by mainstream Hinduism, modern scholars and queer activists have highlighted LGBT themes in lesser-known texts, or inferred them from stories that traditionally are considered to have no homoerotic subtext. Such analyses have caused disagreements about the true meaning of the ancient stories.

== Deities and homosexuality ==
=== Agni ===
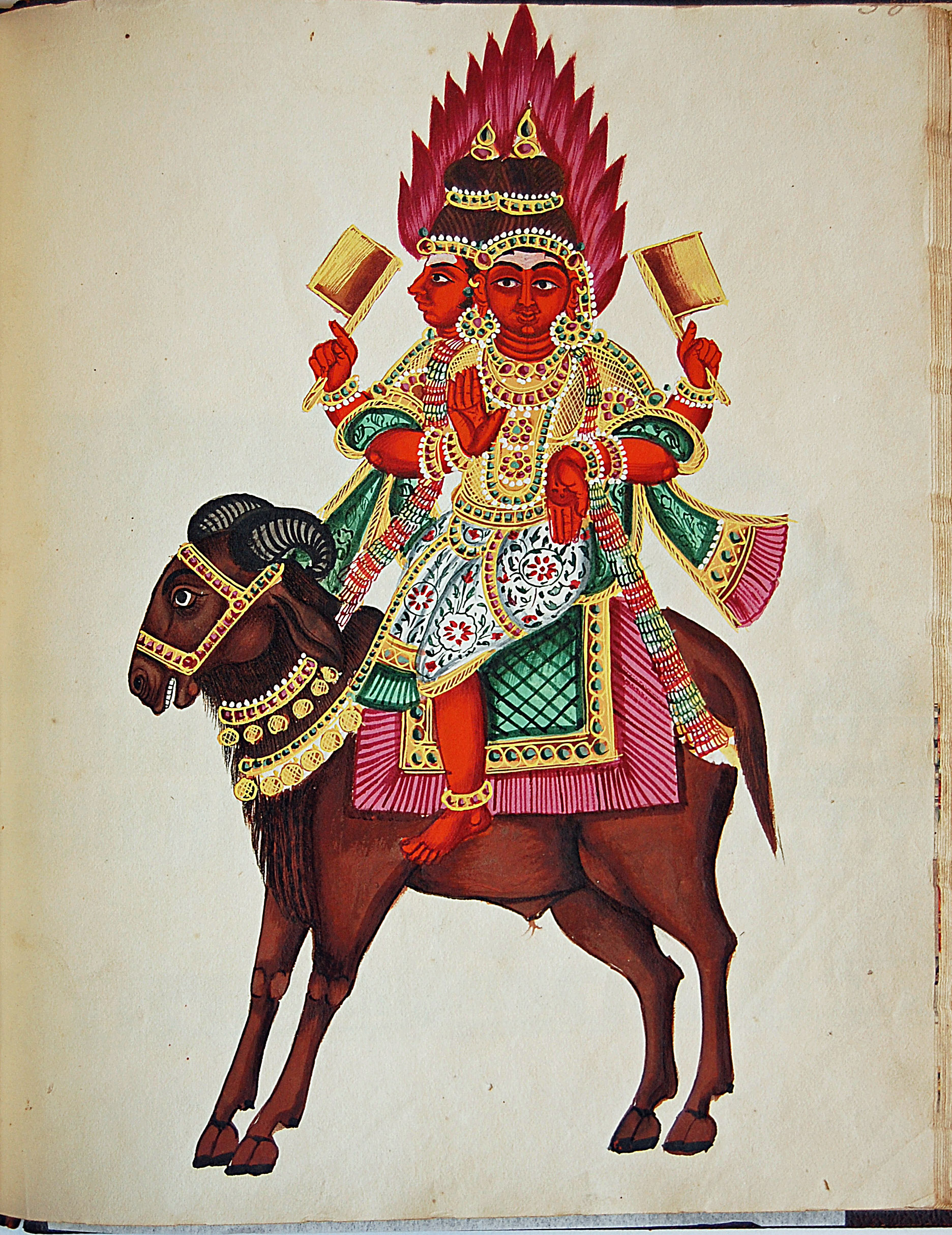
Agni, god of fire. Agni's role in accepting sacrifices is paralleled by his accepting semen from other gods.

Agni is depicted as having both a wife and a husband, and has been said to have ingested Shiva's semen. However, he was condemned by both Shiva and Parvati following the act; the semen, which he consumed as a doce (sweet), was passed into wives of some sages from where it landed on grass and Karttikeya was born: Shiva Purana. Also, this version of Kartikeya's birth differs from the one in the Mahabharata, where Karttikeya was born from the semen of Agni and was suckled by the Krittikas or wives of sages.

Agni, the god of fire, wealth and creative energy, has same-sex sexual encounters that involve accepting semen from other gods. Although married to the goddess Svaha, Agni is also shown as being part of a same-sex couple with Soma, the god of the moon. Agni takes a receptive role in this relationship, accepting semen from Soma with his mouth, paralleling Agni's role in accepting sacrifices from Earth to Heaven. Orthodox Hinduism emphasises that these are "mithuna", ritual sexual encounters, and Agni and his mouth represent the receiving role.

Agni also accepts semen from different deities, in the myth of the conception and birth of Karttikeya, (Note: Also called Murugan, Skanda ("that which is spilled or oozed, namely seed"), Subrahmanya, Kumara ("unmarried" and "Mara-slayer"), Guha ("cave"), Lalita ("the Beautiful"), Kanta ("the Handsome"), Senapati ("Lord of the army") and Brahmacharin ("vowed to celibacy").) a god of male beauty and battle. Numerous versions of Karttikeya's birth story exist, many having a conception from only male input, although heterosexual sex or desire also plays a part. However, Parvati is credited as Karttikeya's mother. Ganga is Karttikeya's mother in other versions, accepting semen from Agni and carrying the unborn child. The male progenitor is sometimes Shiva, Agni, or a combination of the two. In the Shiva Purana and the Ramayana, the gods fear the outcome of Shiva and Parvati's "unending embrace", and interrupt their coitus. Shiva then appears before the gods and declares "now let him step forward who will swallow the semen I ejaculate". At the prompting of the gods, Agni swallows his semen. In these stories, Parvati and Shiva condemn Agni's actions, calling them "wicked" or "improper". In the eleventh century text Kathasaritsagara, however, Shiva forces the unwilling Agni to swallow his ejaculate. The semen causes a burning sensation in those that ingest it, prompting Agni to divest it into wives of a group of sages, under Shiva's advice. The sages' wives, in turn, drop the semen into the Ganges river (the Ganga), where it flows to the shore from which Kārttikeya springs. In the Mahabharata, Kārttikeya is also the son of Agni, who ejaculates into the hands of one of the Krittikas (the Pleiades), who in turn throws the semen into a lake, from whence Kārttikeya is born. In some myths, Agni ejaculates onto a mountain that was itself made from Shiva's divine semen, making Kārttikeya the child of the two gods, according to an interpretation by Markandeya in the Vana Parva.

=== Mitra and Varuna ===
Mitra and Varuna are gods of great intimacy and often mentioned together in Vedic literature. These Adityas preside over the universal waters wherein Mitra controls the ocean depths and lower portals while Varuna rules over the ocean's upper regions, rivers and shorelines.

In Vedic literature, Mitra and Varuna are portrayed as icons of affection and intimate friendship between males (the Sanskrit word Mitra means "friend" or "companion"). They are depicted riding a shark or crocodile together while bearing tridents, ropes, conch shells and water pots. Sometimes they are portrayed seated side-by-side on a golden chariot drawn by seven swans. Ancient Brahmana texts furthermore associate Mitra and Varuna with the two lunar phases and same-sex relations: "Mitra and Varuna, on the other hand, are the two half-moons: the waxing one is Varuna and the waning one is Mitra. During the new-moon night these two meet and when they are thus together they are pleased with a cake offering. Verily, all are pleased and all is obtained by any person knowing this. On that same night, Mitra implants his seed in Varuna and when the moon later wanes, that waning is produced from his seed." (Shatapatha Brahmana 2.4.4.19) Varuna is similarly said to implant his seed in Mitra on the full-moon night for the purpose of securing its future waxing. In Hinduism, the new- and full-moon nights are discouraged times for procreation and consequently often associated with citrarata or unusual types of intercourse.

The Bhagavata Purana (6.18.3-6) lists Varuna and Mitra as having children through ayoni or non-vaginal sex. For example, Varuna fathered the sage Valmiki when his semen fell upon a termite mound, and Agastya and Vasistha were born from water pots after Mitra and Varuna discharged their semen in the presence of Urvasi. This account is arguably similar to gay couples having children through surrogate mothers in modern days.

== Deities and trans themes ==
=== Ardhanarishvara ===
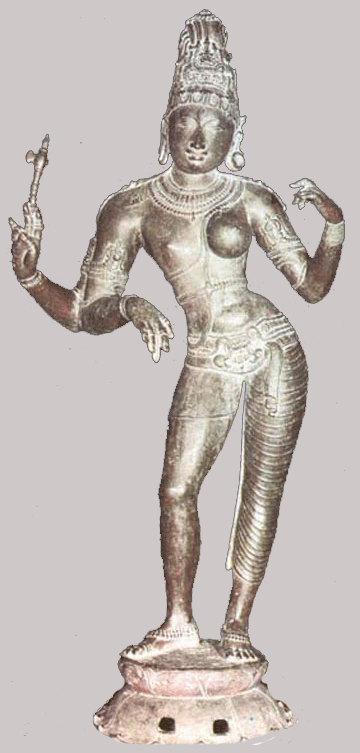
Shiva and Parvati in the form of Ardhanarisvara

Ardhanarishvara is created by the merging of the god Shiva and his consort Parvati whose half right body is male while the left half is female. (Note: Parvati is also called Shakti and Uma) The name Ardhanarishvara means "The Lord whose half is a woman". This form of Shiva represents the "totality that lies beyond duality", and is associated with communication between mortals and gods and between men and women. Alain Danielou says that "The hermaphrodite, the homosexual and the transvestite have a symbolic value and are considered privileged beings, images of the Ardhararishvara."

=== Aravan ===
According to Tamil versions of the Mahabharata, the god Krishna – an avatar of Vishnu – also took the form of Mohini and married Aravan. This was in order to give Aravan the chance to experience love before his death, as he had volunteered to be sacrificed. Krishna remained in mourning in the Mohini form for some time after Aravan's death. This marriage and death of Aravan are commemorated annually in a rite known as Thali, during which Hijras take on the role of Krishna-Mohini and "marry" Aravan in a mass-wedding, followed by an 18-day festival. The festival ends with a ritual burial of Aravan, while the Hijras mourn in Tamil style: by beating their chests in ritual dances, breaking their bangles and changing into white mourning clothes. In other versions, this story does not appear.

== Others ==
A similar merger occurs between the beauty and prosperity goddess Lakshmi and her husband Vishnu, forming the hermaphroditic or androgynous Lakshmi-Narayana.

In the Bhagavata Purana, Vishnu takes the form of the enchantress, Mohini, in order to trick the demons into giving up Amrita, the elixir of life. Shiva later becomes attracted to Mohini and their relationship results in the birth of a son. Mohini is an example of gender fluidity in Hindu mythology. In the Brahmanda Purana, Shiva's wife Parvati "hangs her head in shame" when she sees her husband's pursuit of Mohini. In some stories, Shiva asks Vishnu to take on the Mohini form again so he can see the actual transformation for himself. Stories in which Shiva knows of Mohini's true nature have been interpreted to "suggest the fluidity of gender in sexual attraction".

Pattanaik writes that those focusing only on homoeroticism miss the narrative's deeper metaphysical significance: Mohini's femininity represents the material aspect of reality, and Mohini's seduction is another attempt to induce Shiva into taking an interest in worldly matters. He cites another story to show that only Vishnu has the power to "enchant" Shiva: a demon tries to kill Shiva by taking the form of a woman (placing sharp teeth in "his" vagina). Shiva recognizes the impostor and kills the demon by the placing a "thunderbolt" on his "manhood" during their act of "lovemaking".

In the later, non-Puranic story of the origin of God Ayyappa, (Note: Ayyappa is also known as Hariharaputra, Manikantha, and identified with Dharma-Shasta) Vishnu as Mohini becomes pregnant by Shiva, and gives birth to Ayyappa, who she abandons in shame. Pattanaik writes that rather than Mohini becoming pregnant, Ayyappa sprang from Shiva's semen, which he ejaculated upon embracing Mohini. In another version, the Pandyan king Rajasekhara of Pandalam adopts the baby. In this version, Ayyappa is referred to as ayoni jata, "born of a non-vagina", and later Hariharaputra, "the son of Vishnu and Shiva", and grows up to be a great hero.

Changes of sex and cross-dressing also occur in mythology about non-divine figures.

=== Shikhandi ===
Shikhandi is a character in the Mahabharata. He was originally born as a girl named 'Shikhandini' to Drupada, the king of Panchala. In a previous lifetime, Shikandini was a woman named Amba, who was rendered unmarriageable by the hero Bhishma. Humiliated, Amba undertook great austerities, and the gods granted her wish to be the cause of Bhishma's death. Amba was then reborn as Shikhandini. A divine voice told Drupada to raise Shikhandini as a son; so Drupada raised her like a man, trained her in warfare and arranged for her to marry a female. On the wedding night, Shikhandini's wife discovered that her "husband" was female, and insulted her. Shikhandini fled, but met a yaksha who exchanged his sex with her. Shikhandini returned as a man with the name 'Shikhandi' and led a happy married life with his wife and children. During the Kurukshetra War, Bhishma recognised him as Amba reborn and refused to fight 'a woman'. Accordingly, Arjuna hid behind Shikhandi in order to defeat the almost invincible Bhishma. In the Javanese telling, Srikandi (as she is known) never becomes a man, but is a woman equal to men, and is married to Arjuna. After his death, Shikhandi's masculinity was transferred back to the yaksha.

=== Arjuna ===
Arjuna himself is an example of gender variance. When Arjuna refused her amorous advances, the nymph Urvashi cursed Arjuna; he would become a "kliba", a member of the third gender. Krishna assured Arjuna that this curse would serve as the perfect disguise for Arjuna during his last year of exile. Arjuna took the name Brihannala and dressed in women's clothes, causing the curse to take effect. Thus Arjuna gained entry into the city ruled by king Virata, where he taught the arts of music, singing and dancing to the princess Uttarā and her female attendees. In the Padma Purana, Arjuna is also physically transformed into a woman when he requests permission to take part in Krishna's mystical dance, which only women may attend.

=== Ila ===
The story of Ila, which is a non binary story in Hindu mythology, is about a king cursed by Shiva and Parvati to alternate between being a man and woman each month, appears in several traditional Hindu texts. After changing sex, Ila loses the memory of being the other gender. During one such period, Ila marries Budha (the god of the planet Mercury). Although Budha knows of Ila's alternating gender, he does not enlighten the 'male' Ila, who remains unaware of his life as a woman. The two live together as man and wife only when Ila is female. In the Ramayana version, Ila bears Budha a son, although in the Mahabharata Ila is called both mother and father of the child. After this birth the curse is lifted and Ila is totally changed into a man who goes on to father several children with his wife. In another version, Budha is described as transgender as well.

=== Lopamudra ===
Another story in Hinduism involving a sex change is the story of the sage Lopamudra found in the Giridhara Ramayana. This version of the story is different from the other two (as found in the Rig Vedic Hymns and the Mahabharata) as it depicts Lopamudra as a man who is turned into a woman (in contrast to the others which depict Lopamudra as being created as a woman and remaining so). In the Giridhara Ramayana, the sage Agastya approached the king of Kanyakubja and asked if he could marry one of the king's many daughters when they came of age. The king agreed and promised Agastya that one of his daughters would marry the sage and asked him to wait a few years until then. However, by the time Agastya returned, the king had already married off all his daughters and was so worried about getting cursed by the sage that the king dressed his son Lopamudra as a woman and presented him to Agastya. When Agastya and Lopamudra were married, a miracle occurred and Lopamudra was transformed into a woman.

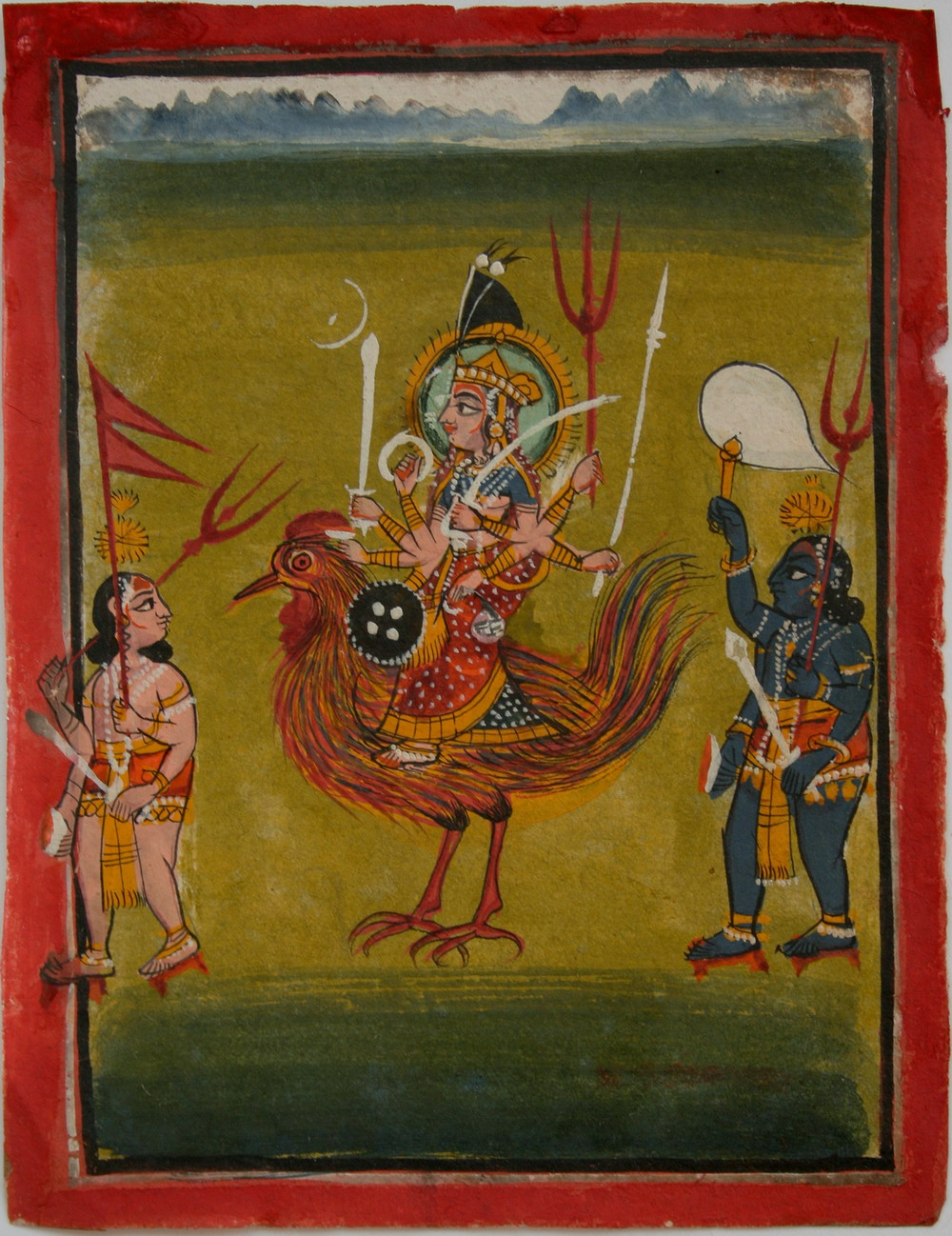
Bahuchar Mata is a patron goddess of the Hijras.

=== Birth of Agni ===
Numerous deities have been considered patrons of third-sex or homoerotically inclined people. This patronage can originate in epical stories about the deity, or from religious practices and rituals. For example, Conner and Sparks argue that the goddess of fire, love and sexuality, Arani, has been linked to lesbian eroticism via rituals in her honor: for example two pieces of wood perceived as feminine, called the adhararani and utararani, are rubbed together, simulating a spiritual lesbian interaction.

These sticks are also perceived as male and female parents of the god Agni who in the Rig Veda is identified as a child of two births, two mothers and even three mothers. His mothers are identified as heaven and earth. These two, called Dyaus and Prithvi, however are also referred to as male and female in the Vedic verses. The two mothers are also referred to as sisters in the verses. The two sticks or aranis used in the ritual are referred to as feminine. In the Bhagavata Purana the two sticks are however interpreted as belonging to opposite genders.

=== Bahuchara Mata ===
Bahuchara Mata is a patron goddess of the Hijra. In popular iconography she is often shown riding a rooster and carrying a sword, trident and a book. Various stories link Bahuchara to castration or other changes in physical sexual characteristics, sometimes as the result of her aiming curses against men. Bahuchara is believed to have originated as a mortal woman who became martyred. In one story, Bahuchara is attacked by a bandit who attempts to rape her, but she takes his sword, cuts off her breasts and dies. In another story, Bahuchara curses her husband when she catches him sneaking to the woods to engage in homoerotic behavior, causing his genitals to fall off and forcing him to dress as a woman.

Stories also link Bahuchara to gender variance after she becomes divine. One epic concerns a king who prayed to Bahuchara for a son. Bahuchara complied, but the prince grew up to be impotent. One night Bahuchara appeared to the prince in a dream and ordered him to cut off his genitals, wear women's clothes and become her servant. Bahuchara is believed to continue to identify impotent men and command them to do the same. If they refuse, she punishes them: for their next seven incarnations they will be impotent. This epic is the origin of the cult of Bahuchara Mata, whose devotees are required to self-castrate and remain celibate. There is the Bahuchara Mata temple in Becharji, Gujarat, where devotees visit to pray.

=== Sambha ===
Samba, the son of Krishna, is also a patron of eunuchs, transgender people and homoeroticism. Samba dresses in women's clothes to mock and trick people, and so that he can more easily enter the company of women and seduce them. In the Mausala Parva, Samba, dressed as woman, is cursed after being questioned about "her" supposed pregnancy. As a result of the curse, Samba, although remaining male, gives birth to an iron pestle and mortar.

=== Birth of Bhagiratha ===
Some versions of the Bengali mythological text Krittivasa Ramayana contain a story of two queens that conceived a child together. When the famous king of the Sun Dynasty, Maharaja Dilipa, died, the demigods become concerned that he did not have an heir. Shiva appeared before the king's two widowed queens and commanded, "You two make love together and by my blessings you will bear a beautiful son." The two queens execute Shiva's order and one of them conceived a child. In other versions of the story, Kamadeva, the god of love, blesses them with a child after they fall in love. The child was born boneless, but by the blessings of the sage Ashtavakra, the child was restored to full health. Ashtavakra named the child "Bhagiratha" – he who was born from two vulvas (bhaga). Bhagiratha would later become one of the most famous mythic kings of India and is credited with bringing the Ganges River down to earth through his austerities.

=== Birth of Ganesha ===
The elephant-headed, wisdom god Ganesha's conception has numerous versions. Some sources consider him to be the progeny of Shiva and Parvati, although conception occurs outside the womb. However, most versions consider him to have been produced purely through the actions of Parvati, who in the Shiva Purana fashioned him from clay. However, when Ganesha blocks Shiva, he is beheaded and later restored to life by Shiva. In a 13th-century Kashmiri text, Jayadratha's Haracaritacintamani, Ganesha's birth is the result of Parvati's menstrual blood being washed into the Ganges, where it is swallowed by Parvati's elephant-headed handmaiden Malini, who in turn gives birth, giving Ganesha an all-female origin. Courtright considers the birth to be "less auspicious" due to the lack of male input and use of bodily fluids such as sweat or menstrual blood, but Ruth Vanita points out that Hindus consider Ganesha's birth auspicious, and that the use of non-procreative bodily fluids is considered sacred and purifying in many Hindu rituals.

=== Angalamma ===
The Angalamma has been worshipped as patron goddess by the Tamil transgender community.

According to a version, After freeing Lord Siva from the power of Bramma’s severed head, Angalamma(Parvati) fell under a grave affliction. The act left her burdened with brammahatti dosham, and Kalaivani(Saraswati) cursed her for crushing Bramma’s head beneath her feet. From that moment, Angalamma lost her settled form. Angalamma began to roam without rest. Her body became frightening—her eyes wide and burning, her teeth sharp and protruding, her neck weighed down by a garland made from entrails. Unable to remain in one place, she wandered through many regions and villages, driven by an unrelenting need to feed. She passed through forests and settlements, and reached Mel Malayanur. There she saw a hut built by a thirunangai (Tamil term for Transgender woman), who lived there alone. When Angalamma reached the hut, she did not reveal her terrifying nature. She appeared simply as a tired woman seeking shelter. The thirunangai welcomed her without hesitation and offered her a place to stay. At that time, the thirunangai was suffering from illness. Angalamma gathered medicinal plants, prepared remedies, and restored her to health. For a time, they lived together quietly. But when the month of Maasi returned, the curse once again took hold of Angalamma. Her fearsome form emerged, and her hunger returned with it. She needed entrails for her garland, yet there was no animal to be found. Witnessing the goddess’s torment, the thirunangai made a decision no one else would have made. She opened her own body and offered her intestines to Angalamma as sustenance. Before doing so, she demanded a binding promise. She said that when Angalamma chose to reside there as a deity, she must not appear in her own form, but in the form of a thirunangai. The land, she insisted, must become fertile and alive. Angalamma accepted these terms. The promise could not be broken. From that moment onward, she was bound to the vow given to the thirunangai. Because of this, Angalamma is worshipped at Malayanur in the form of a thirunangai.

=== Kottankulangara Sree Devi Temple, and Chamayavilkku ===
According to a version of the story of Kottankulangara Devi Temple, a group of young cowherd boys who, cross-dressied as girls, used to play near a stone they revered as god. One day, to their astonishment, the Goddess revealed herself from that very stone. News of this miraculous event soon spread throughout the village, leading the community to build a temple around the stone, accepting it as an expression of divine will. This legend is thought to mark the beginning of the custom of men adorning themselves in female attire annually on the Chamayavilkku festival. The festival is a attended by transgender of Kerala.

== Sangam literature ==
Sangam literature uses the word 'pēṭi' (Tamil: பேடி) to refer to people born with intersex condition; it also refers to Antharlinga hijras and various types of Hijra. Likewise, the famous Sangam period characters of King Kopperuncholan and Pisuranthaiyar are another example of same-sex love. They are said to have not seen each other at all and yet shared love and regard for each other, so much so that they die at the same time in different places. The friendship between King Pari and poet Kabilar is shown as something more than just friendship. There are lyrical undertones suggestive of the intimate relationship between them. But since there is no explicit representation, one can only postulate a possibility.

The Manimekalai, a literary work written by Sangam era poet Satthanar, describes the story of how Buddha showed compassion to the people of a city including a cross-dressing man.

== Critical analysis ==
Queer manifestations of sexuality, though repressed socially, squeeze their way into the myths, legends and lore of the land.

— Devdutt Pattanaik,
The Man Who Was a Woman and Other Queer Tales from Hindu Lore

According to " Ethical issues in six religious traditions", Hindu traditional literary sources say little about homosexuality directly, although there are many references and accounts to suggest LGBTQ characteristics in ancient Hindu literary texts and artworks. Homoeroticism in traditional texts is often masked by adherence to strict gender rules. Critical study is further hampered by the lack of Sanskrit words for modern conceptions (such as homosexuality), although words for specific same-sex sexual acts exist. Timothy Murphy writes that LGBT themes are often ignored by "heterosexist scholars", and even early investigations into sexual minorities in Hindu culture failed to analyse stories or artwork depicting same-sex sexual acts between mythological beings. Murphy describes the study of LGBT topics in Hindu culture as "still in their infancy".

Hindu society had a clear cut idea of all these people in the past. Now that we have put them under one label 'LGBT', there is lot more confusion and other identities have got hidden.

— Gopi Shankar Madurai, National Queer Conference 2013

Goldman writes of transgender themes in Hindu literature: "Few cultures have accorded this phenomenon so prominent a place in the realms of mythology and religion as has that of traditional India." Goldman considers the numerous myths concerning gender change to be a manifestation of patriarchal cultures' desire to control the sexuality of women, but writes that many myths "project a positive valuation of women and femininity". Changes in gender may be caused by a god or through the use of magic, in order to deceive others or to facilitate a romantic encounter. A change in gender may also occur spontaneously due to changes in a person's spiritual or moral character, either in a single life, or through reincarnation.

According to the Encyclopedia of Love in World Religions, queer theorists and activists have reinterpreted ancient texts "searching for alternative voices" that demonstrate the diversity of gender models and sexualities in Hinduism. These scholars include Giti Thadani, who attempted to uncover lesbian subtext in ancient Vedic and Sanskrit texts in Sakhiyani: lesbian desire in ancient and modern India, and Ruth Vanita, who attempts "to locate spaces of same-sex intimacy in vernacular texts" in Same-sex love in India: readings from literature and history.

Some LGBT interpretations of popular stories and characters have been controversial. Ganeśa: Lord of obstacles, Lord of beginnings, applied psychoanalytic approaches to Hindu stories. The book stated that Ganesha's trunk represented a flaccid penis and his love of sweets indicated a desire to perform homosexual oral sex. The deductions of this book, and similar application of psychoanalysis to the study of Hinduism, has been questioned by Western and Indian academics including Antonio De Nicholas, Krishnan Ramaswamy, S.N. Balagangadhara, and Saraha Claerhout, who have stated that the book is based on mistranslations and psychoanalytic misinterpretations. The book became infamous in India, triggering protests and resulting in a public apology from the publishers and withdrawal of the book in India.

The scholarship of Wendy Doniger, which focuses on interpretation of Hindu texts through psychoanalysis, is similarly controversial and has been criticised. Doniger has been described as "being rude, crude and very lewd in the hallowed portals of Sanskrit Academics." Doniger's works that feature LGBT interpretations of Hindu myths include the books Siva: The Erotic Ascetic, Tales of Sex and Violence, and Splitting the difference: gender and myth in ancient Greece and India. Michael Witzel, a professor of Sanskrit, said that Wendy Doniger's knowledge of Vedic Sanskrit is severely flawed. Nicholas Kazanas, a European Indologist, has also criticised Doniger's works and wrote that Doniger seems to be obsessed with only one meaning of myths: the most sexual imaginable.

Scholars like Krishnan Ramaswamy, Vishal Agarwal, Aditi Banerjee, Antonio de Nicolas and many others, have criticized these recent homoerotic interpretations of metaphysical and spiritual incidents that transcend human understandings of nature, like the swallowing of Shiva's semen by Agni out of cosmic necessity, which was condemned as well in the original text. They say that while Hinduism does not oppose accepting the existence of LGBTQ people and identities, applying sexual and queer subtext and terminology to ancient texts - intended for all classes of people and originally lacking any homoerotic or any sexually suggestive or pleasurable subtext altogether - constitutes a gross misinterpretation.

== See also ==
- Bahuchara Mata
- Religion and homosexuality
- Queer theology
- Transgender people and religion
- LGBT topics and Hinduism
- LGBT themes in mythology
- LGBT literature
- LGBT history
- LGBT rights in India
- LGBT rights in Sri Lanka
- Tamil Sexual Minorities
