= Pork bafat =

Indian pork dish

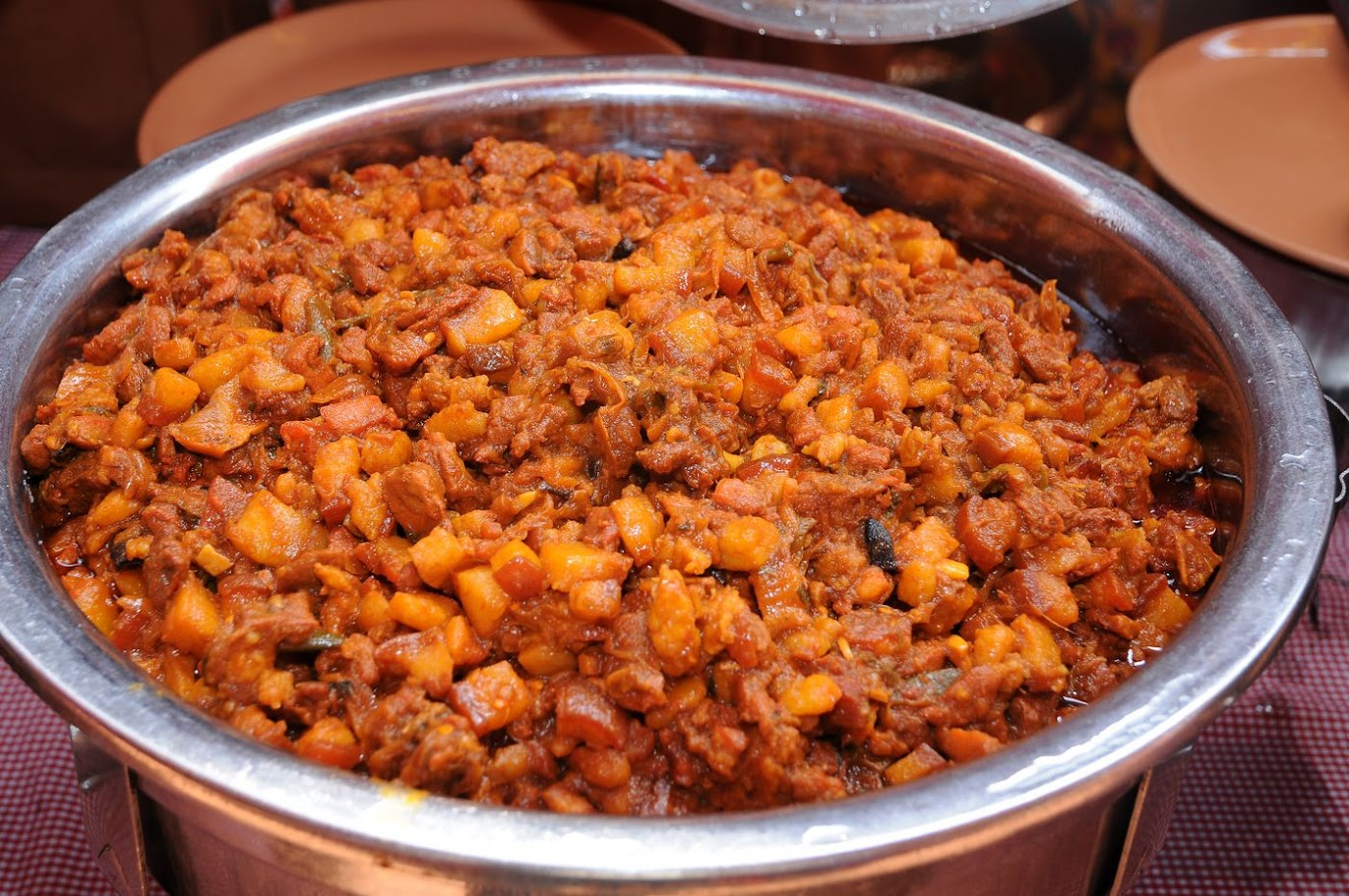
- Alternative names: Dukra Maas
- Course: Main Course
- Region or state: Mangaluru/Goa
- Associated cuisine: Mangalorean Catholic cuisine

Pork bafat (also known as dukra maas) is a spicy pork curry from the Mangalorean Catholic community in India. The dish is characterized by its flavor, which comes from slow-cooking the pork in a spice blend called bafat powder. It is a close relative of sarapatel.

The bafat powder is a unique blend of spices (including red chillies, coriander seed, cumin, peppercorns, turmeric, and sometimes mustard seed and clove) and the Byadagi chilli. Some other ingredients include vinegar and tamarind.

This dish is usually made on Sunday in every Mangalorean Catholic house. It is usually served with sanna or pav (an Indo-Portuguese style bread roll). which are perfect for a thick gravy.

The pork kaliz ankiti is made in the same fashion but with the heart, the lungs and the intestines of the pig.
