= Doce (disambiguation) =

Doce is a Portuguese female band.

Doce may also refer to:

- Doce (sweet), a Goan sweet
- Twelve, in Spanish
- Doce River in Brazil
- Doce River (Goiás)
- Doce River (Rio Grande do Norte)
- Lidia Doce (1916–1958), Cuban revolutionary and courier
