= Ayoni =

Non-vaginal sex in Hindu culture

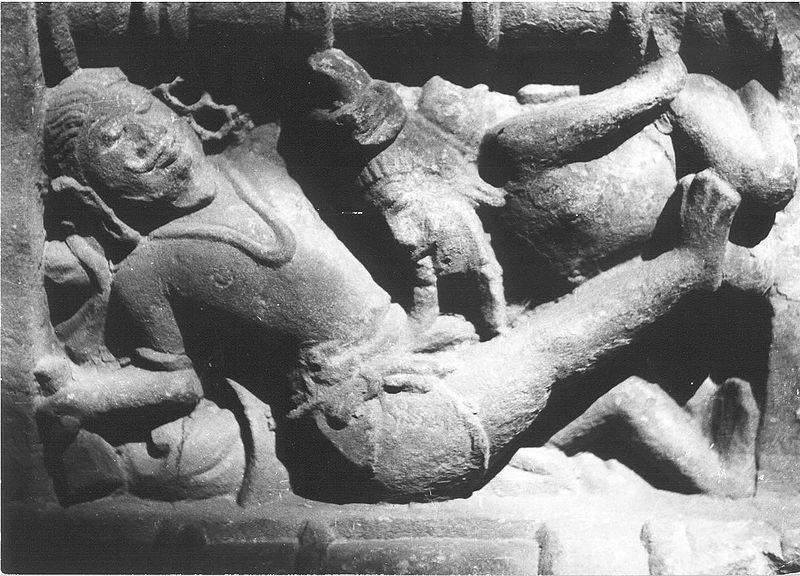
At the Lakshmana temple in Khajuraho (954 CE), a man receives fellatio from a seated male as part of an orgiastic scene.

Ayoni is non-vaginal sex in Hindu culture. The concept of ayoni is broad and can include oral, anal, and manual sex, intercourse with other animals, and forms of masturbation.

Hindu law books tend to prohibit ayoni, but epic narratives and Puranas, on the contrary, describes the birth of heroic children or even gods from this kind of sex. Sometimes such a contradiction can be found even within the same text, such as in the Mahabharata. Thus, ayoni is presented either as impure or as sacred. This inconsistency can be explained by the fact that normally taboo practices can be sanctified by ritual contexts.

== Etymology ==
Since yoni is the vagina, the literal meaning of the term ayoni is "non-vagina".

== Mythology ==
In the sacred texts, ayoni is responsible for the birth of many gods and heroes. Among them are both the Gurus of the Mahabharata, Dronacharya and Kripacharya. There is also a legend that Ayyappa was born of two men as a result of ayoni. The Hindu god of war Kartikeya was born under circumstances when Shiva was interrupted during coitus with his wife, Parvati, and ejaculated into the flames, i.e. into the hand of the god of fire Agni (according to another version, into his mouth).

== History ==
One of the earliest prohibitions on ayoni is found in the Manusmriti (the Laws of Manu).

The penalties for ayoni are very lenient when compared to other sexual offenes, such as adultery. The Arthashastra prescribes that the ayoni be punished with a small fine (IV.XIII: 236). The Laws of Manu also prescribe a minor fine or in some cases even just taking a bath (XII, 175; XIII, 236).

During the British Rule in the Indian subcontinent, Section 377 of the Indian Penal Code (1860) prohibited sex "against the nature and order".

On 6 September 2018, the Supreme Court unanimously ruled that Section 377 is unconstitutional as it infringed on the fundamental rights of autonomy, identity, and intimacy, thus legalizing homosexuality in India.

== Kama Sutra ==
Vatsyayana's Kama Sutra, while not denying the existence of the prohibition, considers its violation permissible, detailing oral sex (auparishtaka) and other forms of ayoni.

== Sodomy and ayoni ==
Although ayoni, like Western sodomy, describe similar various types of sex commonly regarded as reprehensible, there are significant differences between the concepts:

- In the Abrahamic religions, sodomy is understood to be a terrible sin that deserves serious punishment. In Hindu law, however, ayoni remained a rather minor offense.
- Western sodomy was not talked about out loud and its mention in literature and art was restricted. In Hinduism, there was no such prohibition against mentioning ayoni.
- In Western countries, sodomy was legally forbidden for centuries. Punishments varied up to the capital punishment. In the case of ayoni, such extreme measures were never taken.

== See also ==
- Anti-sodomy laws
- Auparishtaka
- LGBT history in India
- LGBT themes in Hindu mythology
- Religion and sexuality
