= Kuswar =

Christmas goodies prepared by Konkani Christians

Kuswar or Kuswad is a set of festive sweets and snacks made and exchanged by Christians of the Konkan region in the Indian subcontinent for the Christmas season or Christmastide. These goodies are major parts of the cuisines of the Goan Catholic community of Goa in the Konkan region, and the Mangalorean Catholic community of Karnataka. There are as many as 22 different ethnic recipes that form this distinct flavour of Christmas celebration in Goa and Mangalore. Kuswad is also made and exchanged by Karwari Catholics of Carnataca and the Kudali Catholics of Sindhudurg, in the Konkan division of Maharashtra.

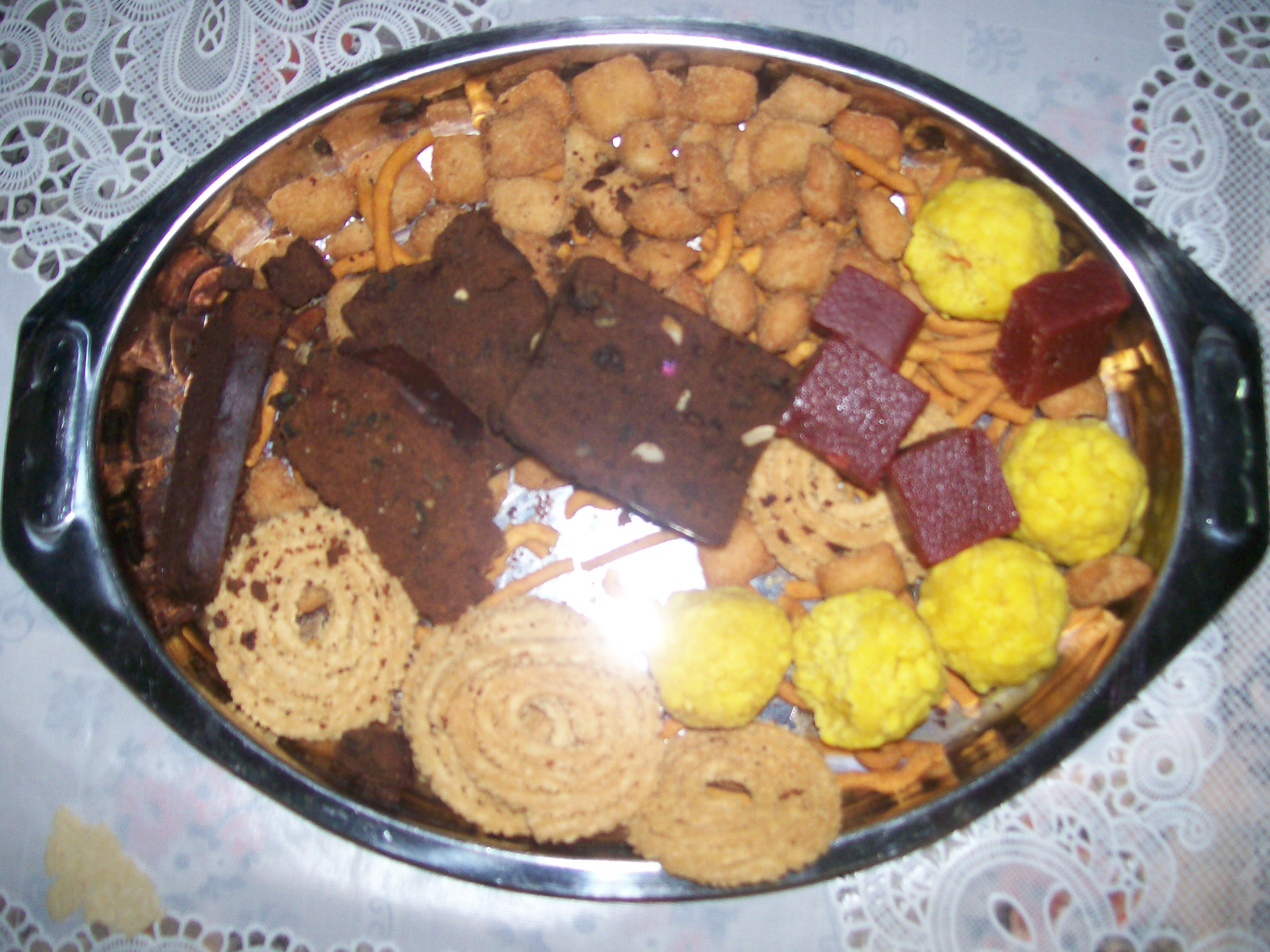
Koswad in Bombay metro

Koswad, derived from the Indo-Portuguese term consoada, refers to the dinner served on Christmas Eve; it is synonymous with the Christmas spirit of "sharing" for the Bombay East Indian Catholics in their native Maharashtri Konkani dialects. Koswad ranges from kidyos and nevryos, to Christmas cakes, duck roasts, marzipan & other delicacies.

== Goa ==
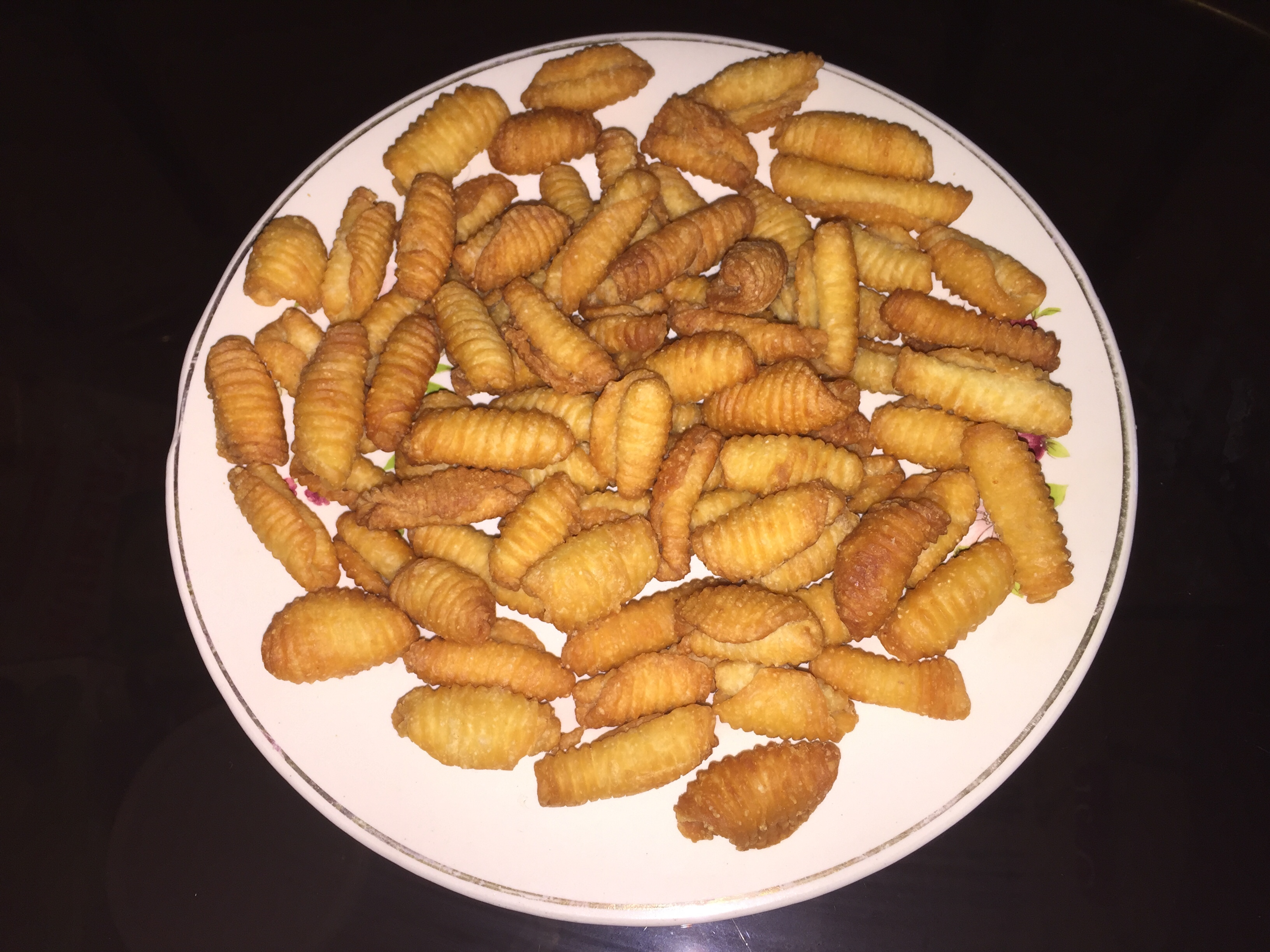
Kolkola or Kulkuls

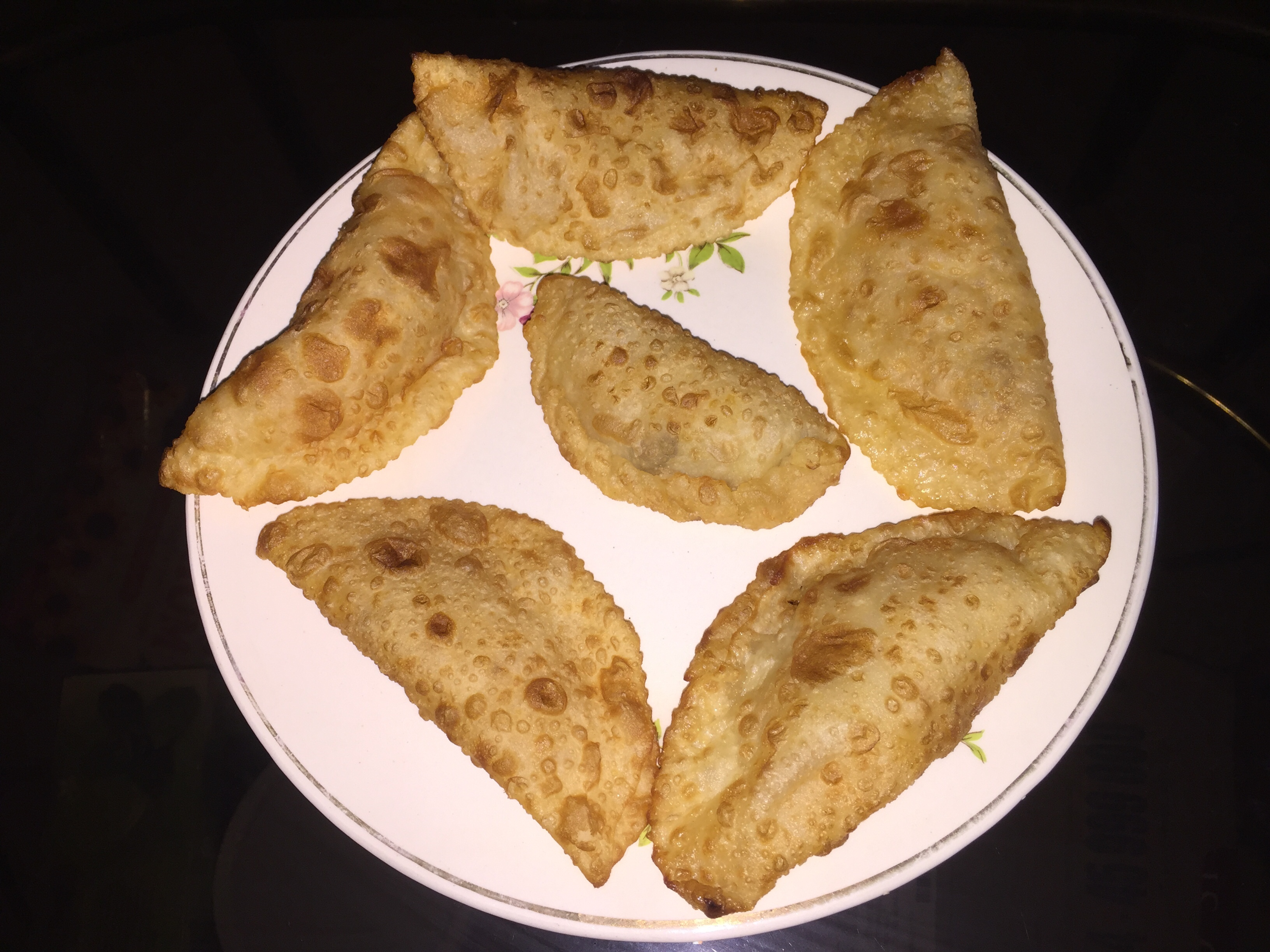
Nevrio or Neuries

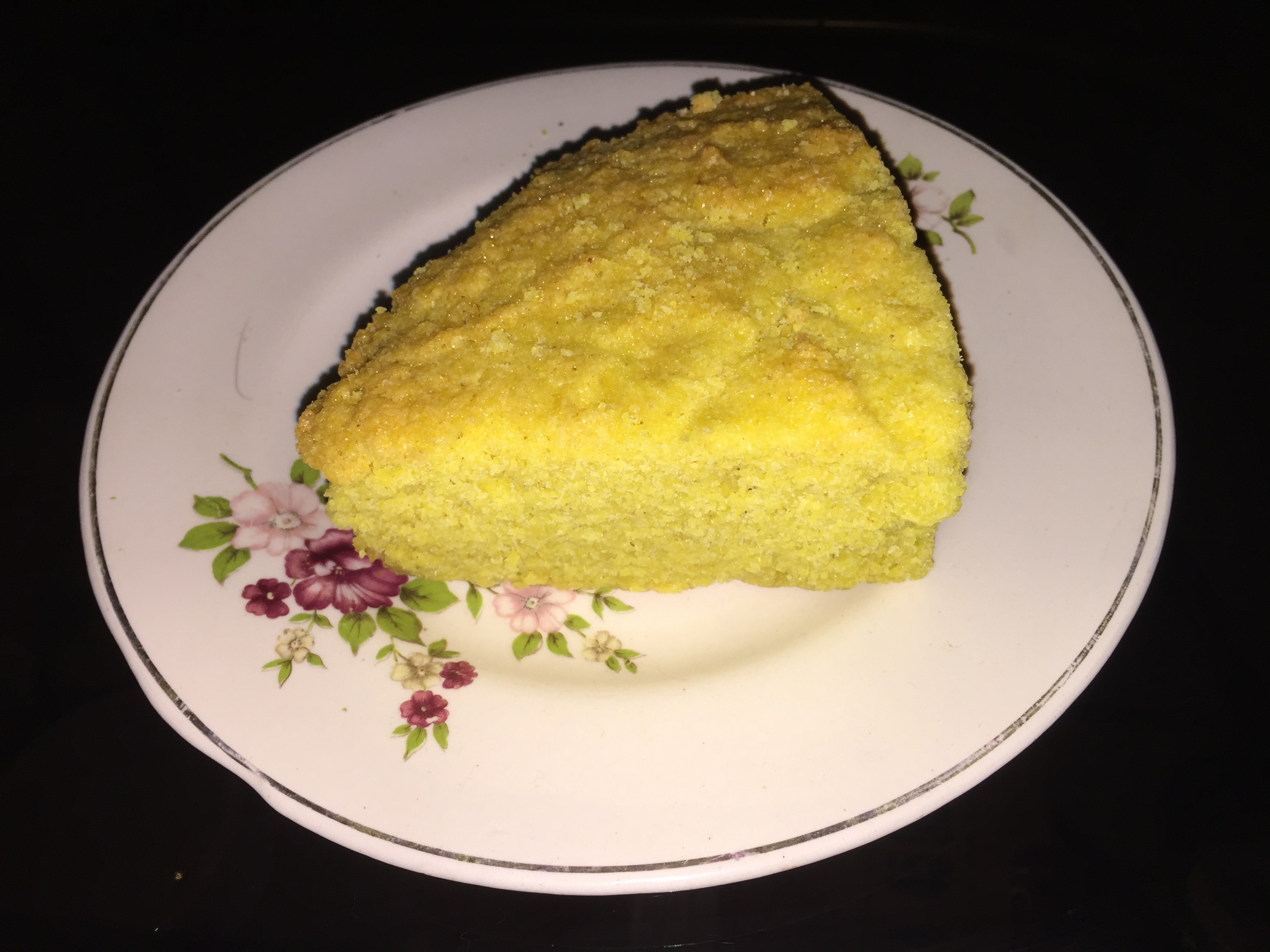
Baath (coconut-semolina cake)

The kuswar of Goan Catholics contains as many as 22 different traditional recipes that give a distinct flavour to Christmas celebration in Goa.

- Perada (Guava cheese) is a confection made from savory green guavas and sugar.
- Kidyo or Kulkuls are a semolina-based confection flavoured with coconut and cardamom.
- Neuero or Neuries are dough mixed with coconut, cashew nuts, raisins and cardamom and then deep fried.
- Bebik (Bebinca) is a layered baked dessert made with flour, sugar, coconut milk and ghee.
- Doce (Doce de Grao) is a sweet made using chickpeas and coconut.
- Marzipan is a confection consisting primarily of sugar and almond meal.
- Bolinhas are small cakes also known as coconut cookies made with grated coconut, sugar, semolina, egg yolks and butter. They are flavoured with cardamom, made into a round shape with markings on top, and baked gently.
- Nankatais, which resemble snowballs, are made from sugar, butter, and flour, and are beaten until light and white. They are flavoured with vanilla and cardamom, rolled round, and lightly baked.
- Baath is a moist, rich coconut tart baked in a large round shape with pastry lattice work on top. It is flavoured with cardamom and currants.
- Kormolas are sweet coconut pastries rolled out, cut in squares, and shaped into flower buds.
- Pinarg (Pinaca) are cutlet-like sweets made from jaggery and crushed rice.
- Mango Miskut is a confection made from mango pulp and sugar.
- Tuelinnas (Tuelinnas de Coco) are sweets made from coconut.
- Dodol is a type of jaggery and rice pudding.

== Mangalore ==
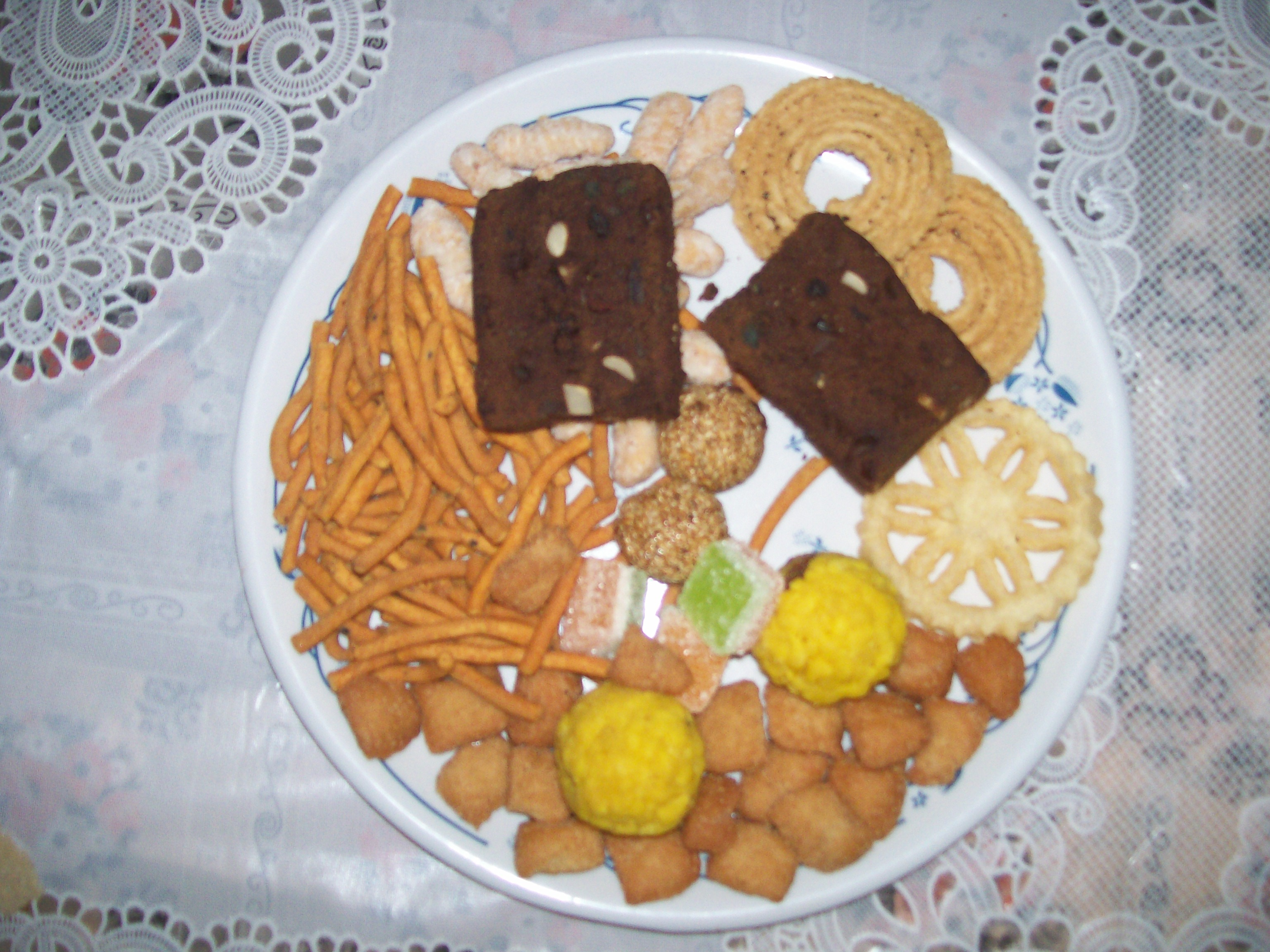
Mangalorean Catholic Kuswar in Bombay (Mumbai)

The kuswar of Mangalorean Catholics also has traditional recipes. Neuero or Neuries are puffs stuffed with plums, nuts, and fried theel (sesame) and sugar. Kidyo or Kulkuls are curly concoctions dipped in sugar treacle, Pathekas are savoury of green nandarkai bananas. Simple salted or sweetened Tukdi (Diamond Cuts), theel Laadus and Golios are other items found in kuswar. Macaroons is what Manglore is famous for and the subtle flavoured Rose Biscuits are a favourite. The Rich Plum Cake takes the better part of a week to make. Candied fruit, plums, currents and raisins are cut and soaked in rum. Flour is sieved and gently warmed in the sun. Nuts are shelled and chopped and families make the cake together. Jobs are allotted; one whips up the eggs while another creams the butter and sugar, cake tins are lined, and a strong pair of arms are requested to do the final mixing and stirring. The Mitais, Mandas, Ushae, Pitae & Manni are well-known, sweet dishes included in the kuswar.

== Mumbai (Bombay), Thana (Trombay) & Vasai (Bassein) ==
The koswad of Bombay East Indian Catholics also includes recipes like thali sweets, donuts, date rolls etc. These are not found among Goans of southern Konkan, Mangaloreans or Karwaris of Carnataca & Damanese of Damaon, Dio & Silvassa.

== See also ==
- Culture of Goan Catholics
- Goan Catholic cuisine
- Monti Fest
- Bandra Fest
- Feni (Goa)
- Sanna (dish)
- Dodol
