= Rosette (fritter) =

Deep-fried fritter

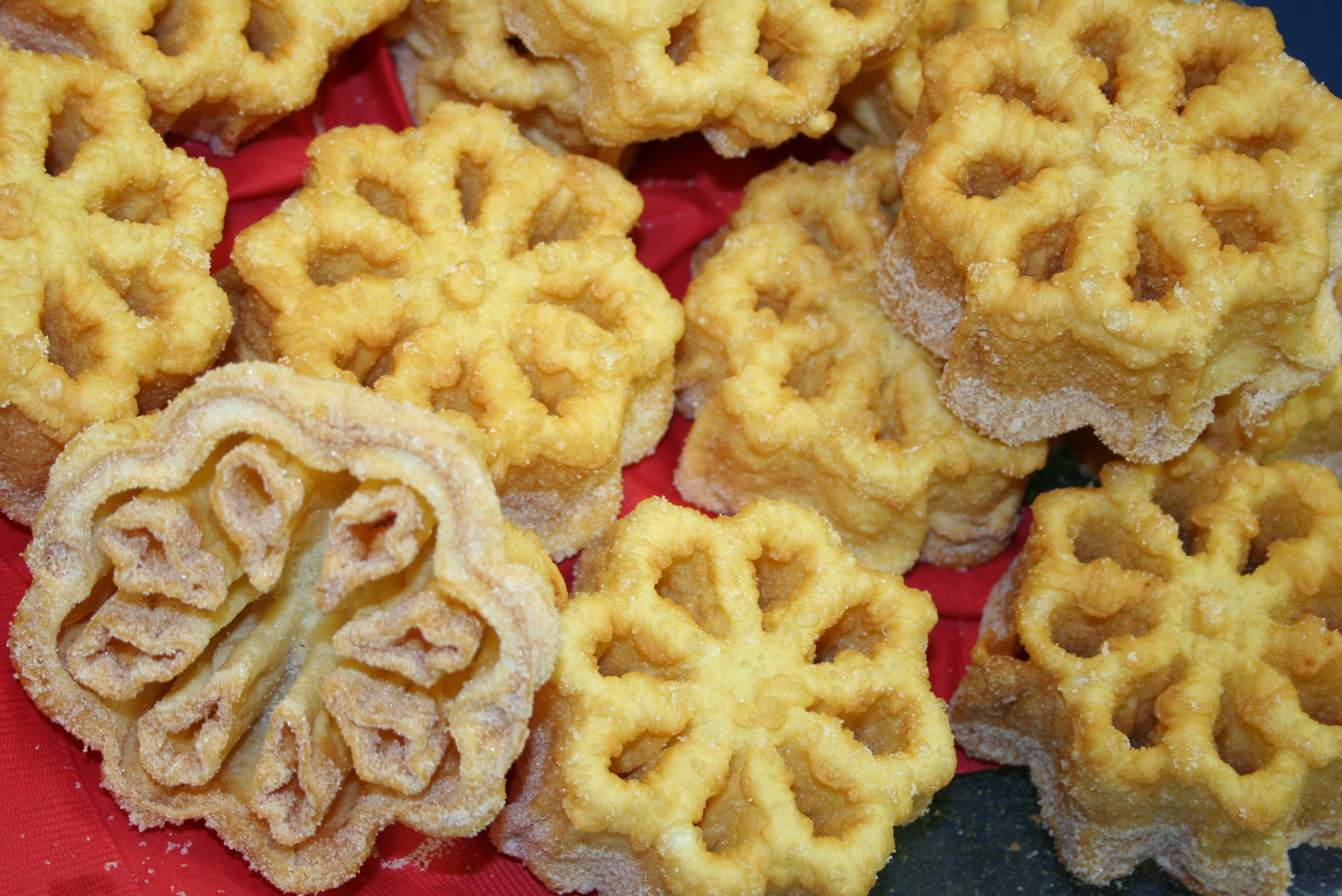
- Sugared rosettes from a bakery
- Type: Fritter
- Course: Snack, dessert
- Main ingredients: Batter (wheat flour, milk, sugar, salt, eggs)
- Variations: Timbale, Kembang goyang, Kokis, Achappam

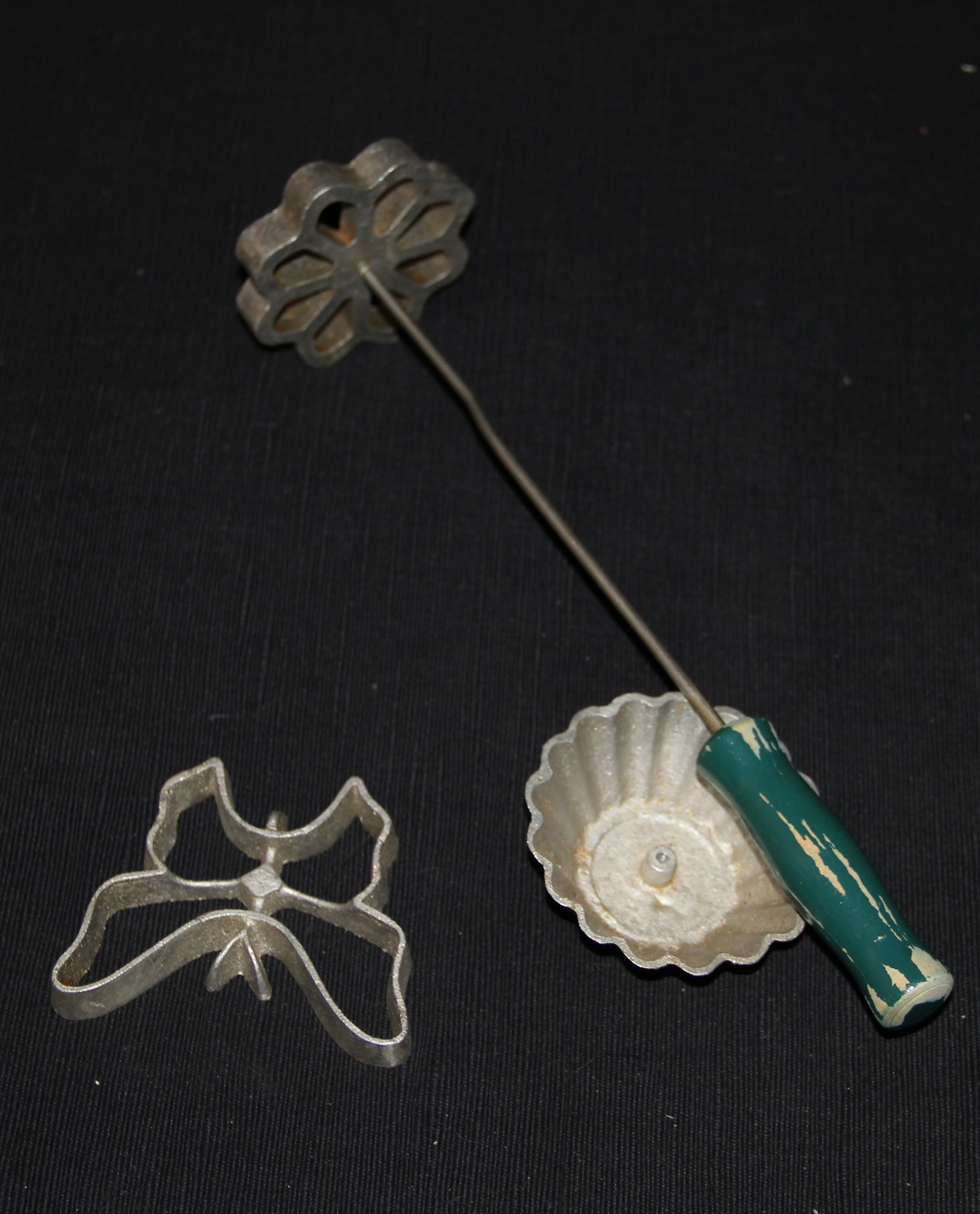
Rosette irons

Rosettes are thin, cookie-like fritters made with iron molds that are found in many cultures. They are crispy and characterized by their lacy pattern.

== Preparation ==
The batter is a blend of wheat, flour, eggs, sugar, and whole milk. Rosette cookies are formed with a rosette iron. This specialized tool has a long handle and with a metal shape, commonly stars, flowers, snowflakes or Christmas trees. In Kerala, India, Rosette cookies known as Achappam are made using rice flour.

The metal is heated in hot oil before it is dipped in batter. Returning the iron to the oil, the batter is detached from the mold when it is partially cooked and gently flipped to finish cooking. They are usually topped with sugar or honey, or the edges of rosettes are dipped into frosting. The process was recorded in the 19th century Ottoman cookbook Aşçı başı.

Swedish timbale can be made with rosette batter using a timbale mold instead of an iron. These can be made with savory fillings like creamed chicken and mushrooms.

== Geographic distribution ==
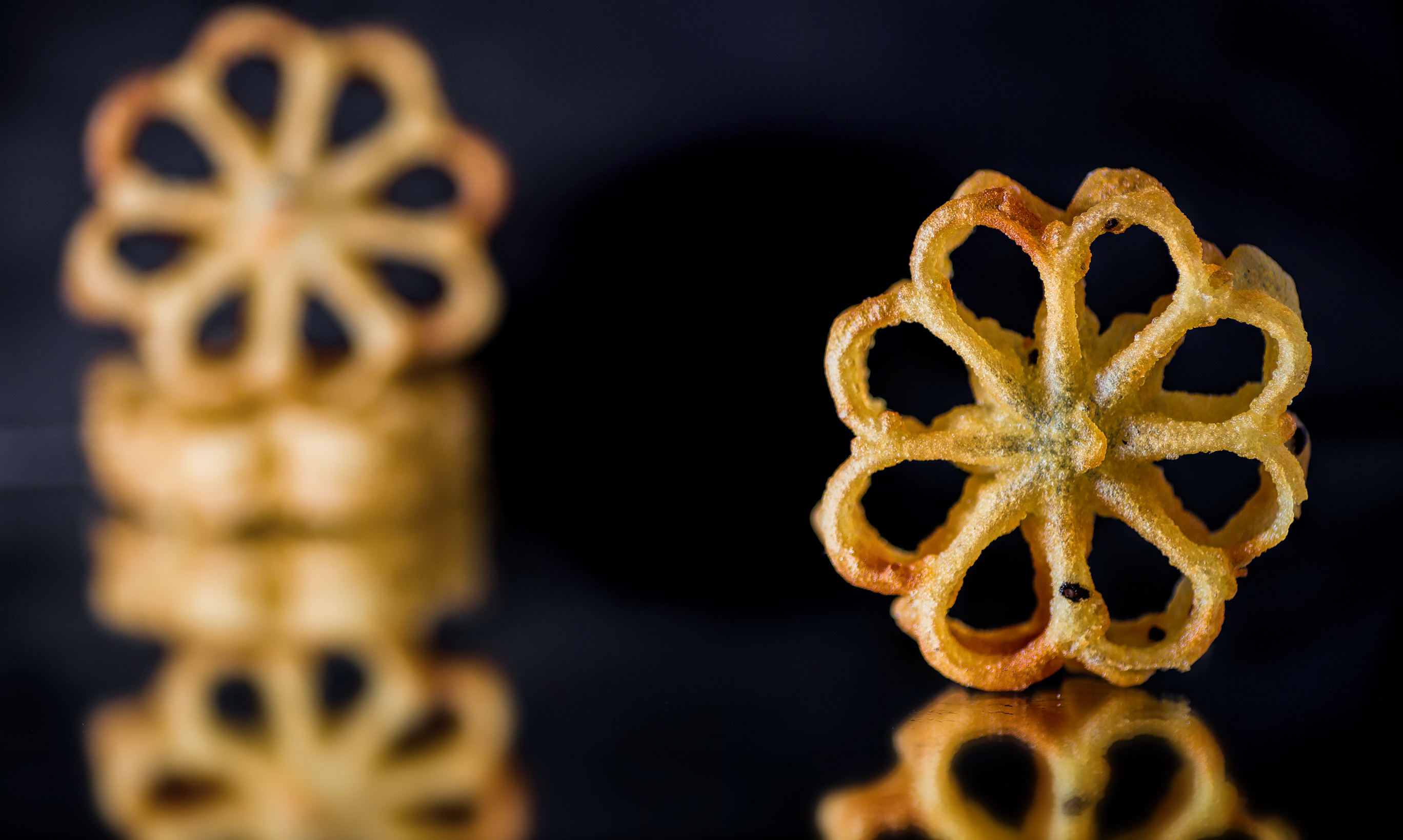
Achappam rosette cookies from India

Versions of this cookie exist in places such as northern Europe, Iran, Turkey, and Sri Lanka.

This type of fritter exists in Nordic countries known as:

- Denmark: rosetbakkelse
- Finland: rosetti
- Norway: rosettbakkels; rosetter
- Swedish: struvor

Rosette recipes are popular in the United States among families with Scandinavian ancestry.

In Alentejo (Portugal), they are known as filhós de forma (lit. 'formed donuts') or filhós de floreta (lit. 'flower donuts') are popular at Christmas. The batter is flavored with port and orange juice.

- Spain: flores manchegas (lit. 'La Mancha flowers')
- Mexico: buñuelos de viento (lit. 'wind fritters')

In the Middle East and western Asia:

- Afghanistan: kulcha-e-panjerei (lit. 'window biscuits')
- Iran: shirini panjerei (شیرینی پنجره‌ای)
- Turkey: demir tatlisi
- Tunisia: chebbak el-janna

They are typical of Anglo-Indian cuisine and a favourite among Indian Christians during the Christmas season. They are called rose cookies or rose biscuits in Indian-English. In India, they are made from flour, sugar, eggs and coconut milk:

- Bangla: fuljhuri pitha, fulkuchi pitha
- Malayalam: achappam
- Odia: mahughara khaja
- Tamil: acchu murukku
- Sinhala and Sri Lankan Tamil dialects: kokis
- Telugu: gulabi puvvulu

In Cantonese they are known as tong wan. It was introduced to Hawaii, where they are known as Chinese pretzels. In Malaysia, they are known as kuih Loyang.

== See also ==
Media related to Rosettes (food) at Wikimedia Commons

- List of fried dough foods
- List of Christmas dishes
- Christmas cookie
- Norwegian cuisine
- Swedish cuisine

== Related reading ==
- Astrid Karlsen Scott (2000) Authentic Norwegian Cooking (Nordic Adventures). ISBN 978-0963433978.
- Jan Hedh (2012) Swedish Cookies, Tarts, and Pies (Skyhorse). ISBN 978-1616088262.
