= Bafat =

Spice mix

Bafat, also spelled bafad or baffat, is a type of masala used in Mangalorean and Goan cuisines, particularly in Mangalorean Catholic and Goan Catholic cooking. It is commonly made with a mixture of dried and ground chilli peppers, coriander seeds, cumin seeds, mustard seeds, black peppercorn, turmeric, cinnamon and cloves. Bafat is most well known for its use in a pork stew, which is also called Pork Bafat or "dukra maas", that is commonly served with sanna. It is also used to season other meats and vegetables.

== See also ==
- Sarapatel
