= Kokis =

Sri Lankan food

Kokis (කොකිස්)
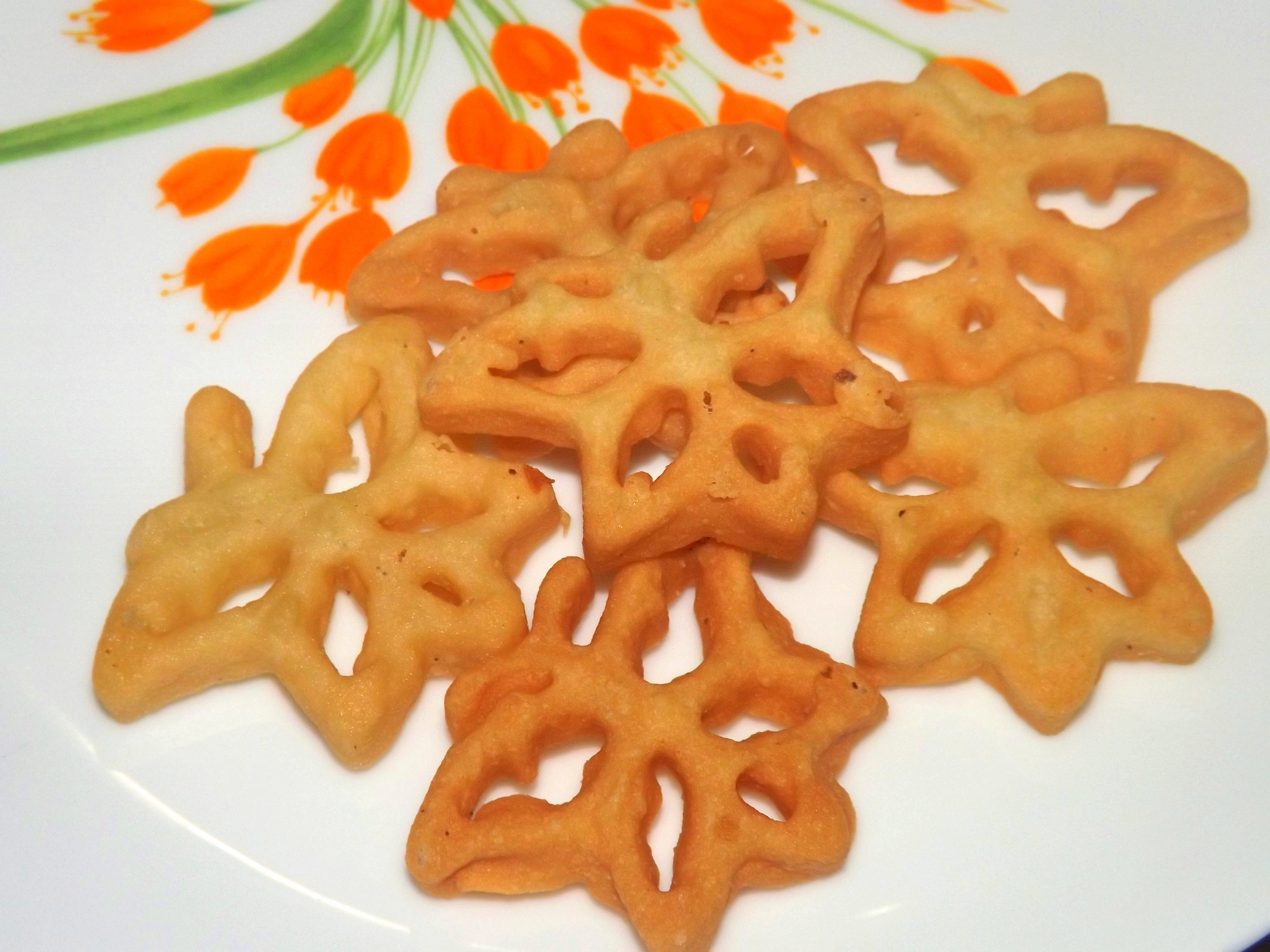
- A plate of butterfly-shaped kokis
- Type: Savoury / Sweet
- Course: Appetizer
- Place of origin: Sri Lanka
- Main ingredients: Rice flour, Coconut milk

Kokis (Sinhala: කොකිස්) is a deep-fried, crispy Sri Lankan food made from rice flour and coconut milk. Considered as a festive traditional Sri Lankan dish. This is an important snack when celebrating Sinhala New Year and plays a major role in the festivities.

== Etymology and history ==
Although a traditional Sri Lankan dish, kokis is believed to be of Dutch origin from the time when parts of the country were under Dutch rule during the Kandyan period. Its name may have been derived from the word koekjes, meaning cookies or biscuits in the Dutch language. The Swedish rosette and the Persian Nan panjereh would be the most similar dishes to the Sri Lankan kokis. The Indian biscuit, Nankhatai, also bears some similarities with kokis. An almost identical snack, Achappam, exists among Christian community in the south west Indian state of Kerala

=== Significance during the Sinhala new year ===
Sinhalese people prepare and consume a number of traditional dishes, including kokis, to celebrate their new year in mid-April. These are traditionally prepared by the women of the household, usually a few days before the new year. Nowadays however, they are made mostly by older women, as many people of the younger generation lack the time or the skill and knowledge required to make them due to their busy lifestyles.

== Description ==
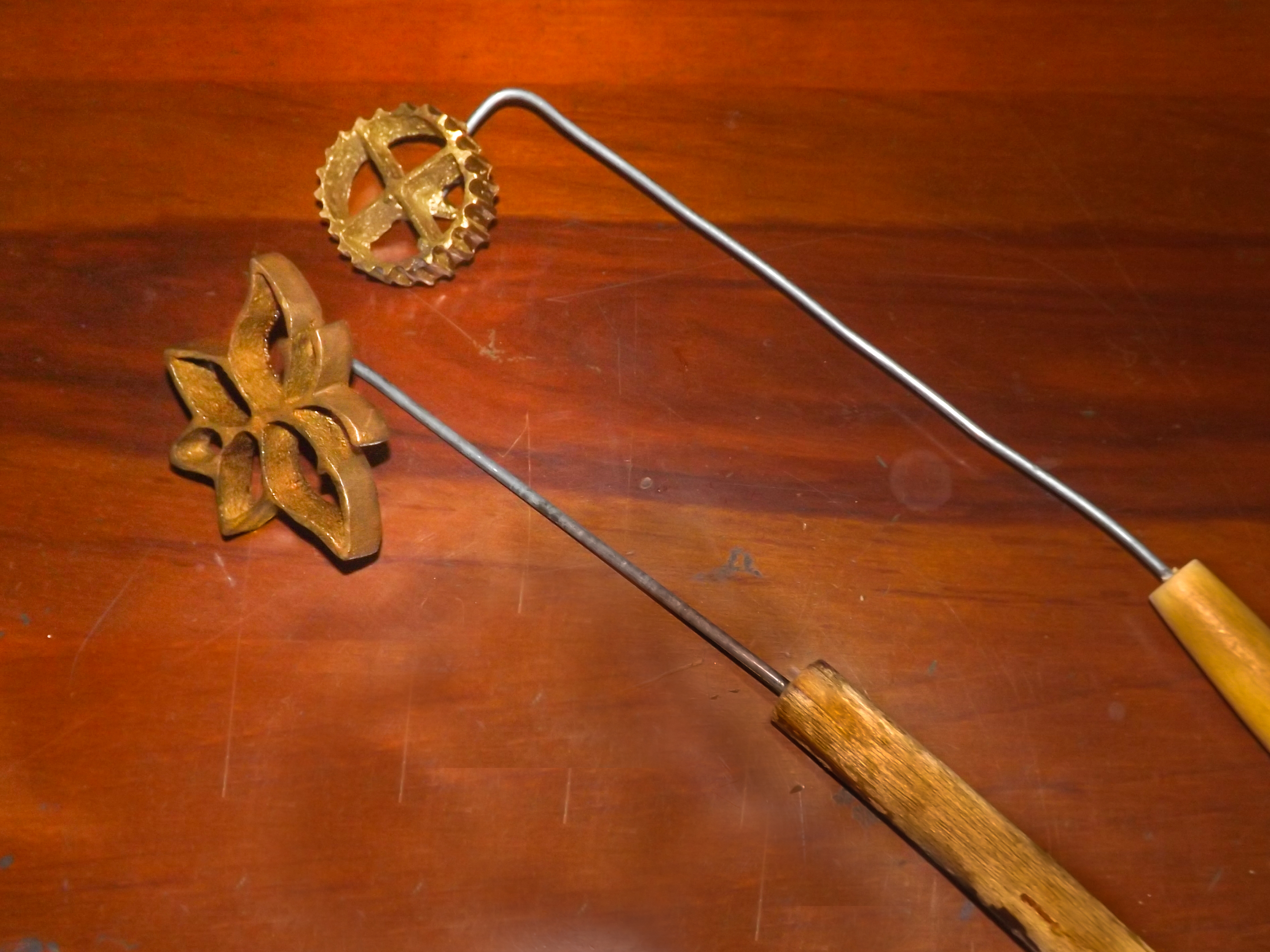
Two kokis molds

A special mold of decorative shape such as a flower is used to make kokis. This is called a kokis achchuwa (Sinhala: කොකිස් අච්චුව). It is also called Rosette cookies in English. This mold is coated in a thick batter made from rice flour, coconut milk and beaten eggs. Sugar and salt may be added to the mixture as well. The batter-covered mold is dipped in boiling coconut oil, and the kokis is shaken off the mold and into the oil when it is half cooked and allowed to deep fry until ready. The cooked dish is crispy, and may be served hot or after cooling down. The oil is usually drained on paper before serving. It may also be prepared using wheat flour, as an alternative to the traditional rice flour.

Kokis may be consumed as a dessert, and also as an appetizer or snack. It is also commonly served with kiribath and other traditional sweets, which are collectively referred to as sweet eats or rasa kavili (Sinhala: රස කැවිලි), particularly at new year celebrations and other auspicious occasions.

=== Health effects ===
Like most of the traditional Sri Lankan sweet eats, kokis is a food that has a high energy-density. As an oily and fatty food, there is a risk of it causing heart diseases and narrowing of blood vessels.

== See also ==
- Achappam
- Nankhatai
- Rosette (cookie)
