= Kidyo =

Indian snack

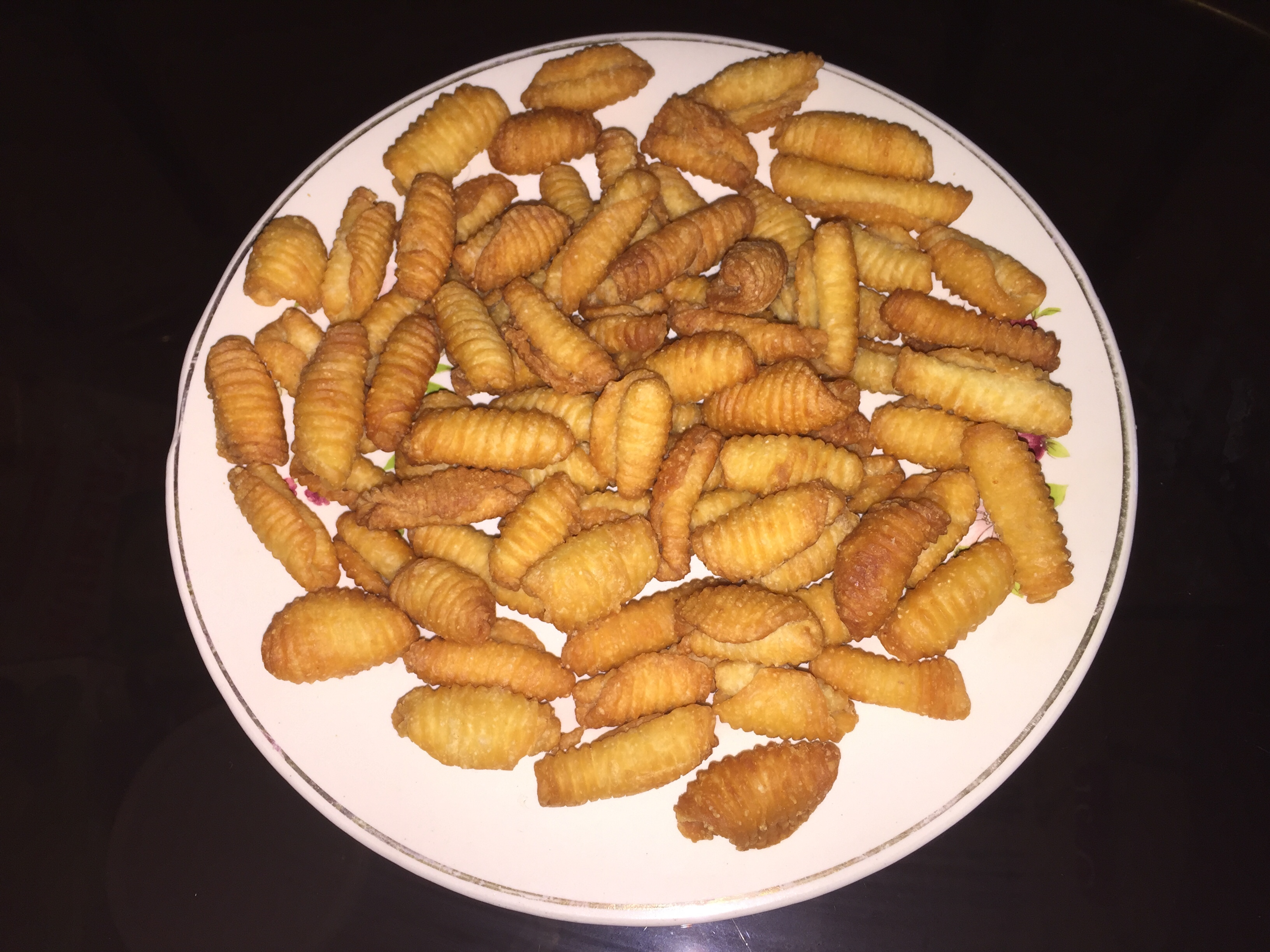
- Goan Kulkuls
- Alternative names: Kulkuls
- Place of origin: India
- Associated cuisine: Indian cuisine

Kidyo, also known as Kulkul, Carambola, and Kormola, is a sweet dish traditionally prepared for Christmas as part of the Kuswar in Goa and Mangalore, as well as among the East Indian community of Maharashtra.

Kulkul is made from maida flour, milk and sometimes eggs, and shaped into the form of small shells and fried in ghee or oil.

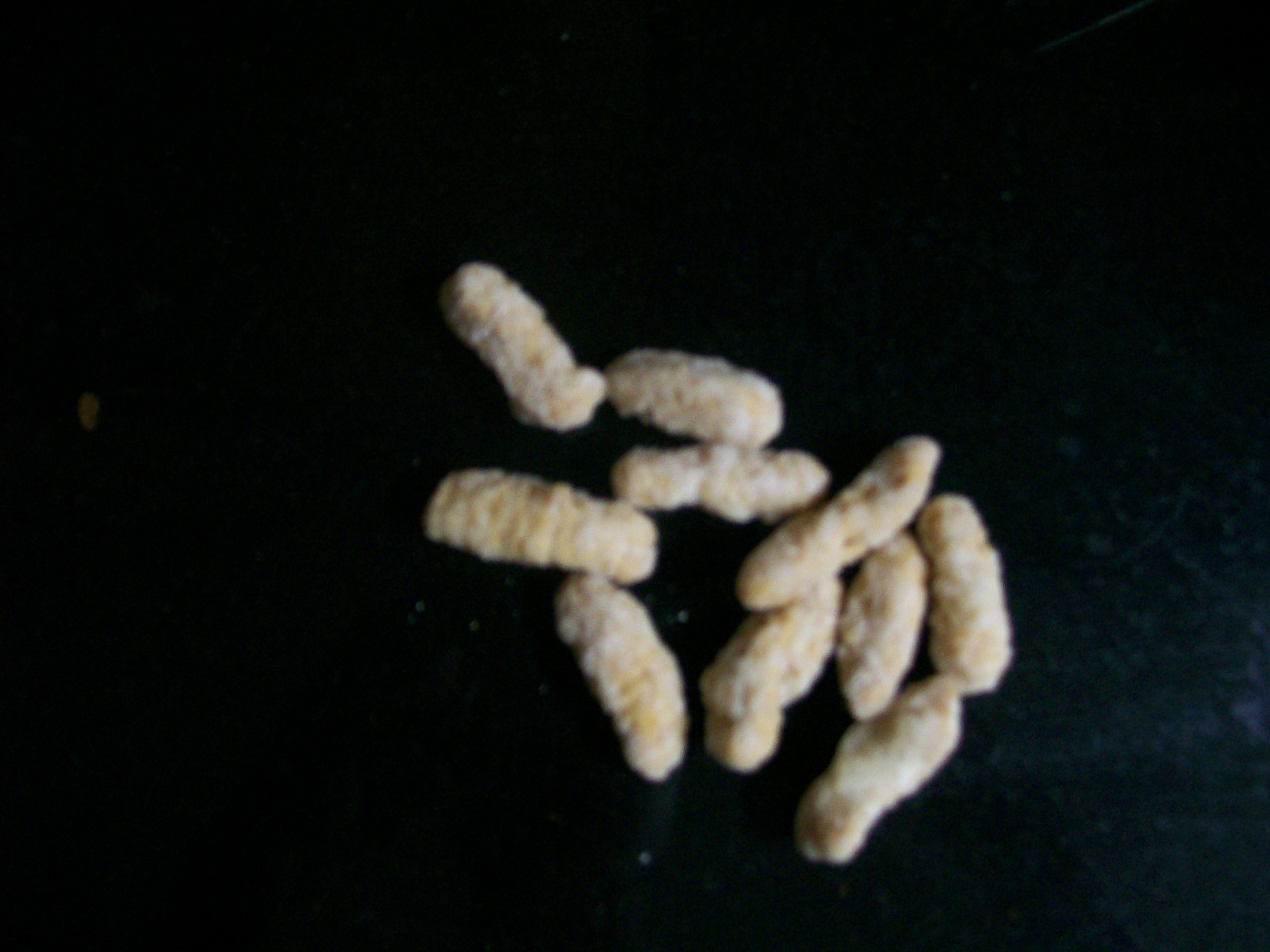
Kidyo are typically served during Christmas festivities
