= Doce (sweet) =

Traditional Goan dessert

Goan Doce
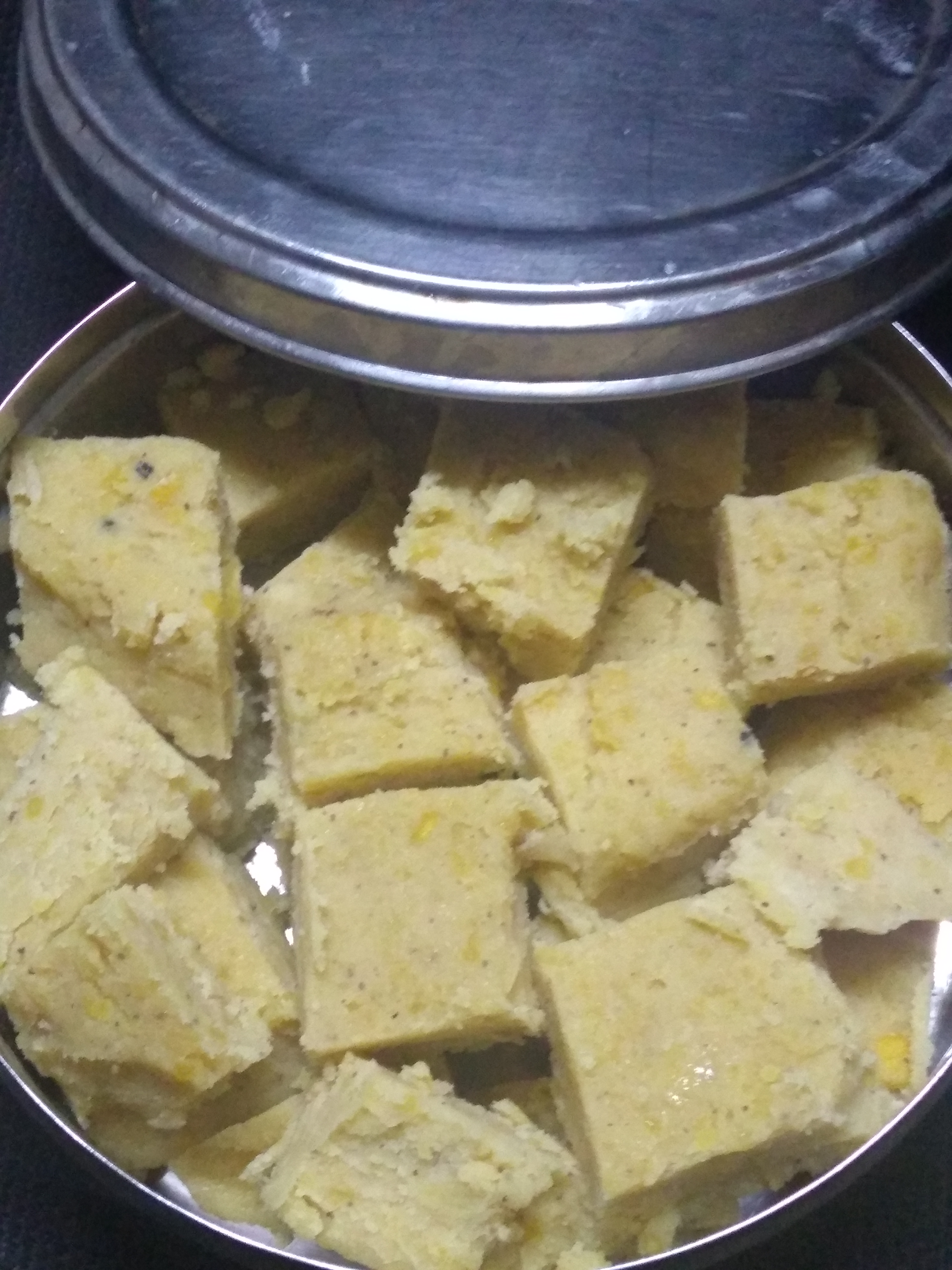
- Doce cut into small pieces
- Alternative names: Channa Doce, Doce de Grão
- Type: Sweet
- Course: Dessert
- Place of origin: India
- Region or state: Goa
- Main ingredients: Bengal gram; Coconutdesiccated; Sugar
- Ingredients generally used: Ghee; Cardamom; Salt

Doce, also known as dal kapa or doce de grão, is a popular sweet prepared for in Goa for various occasions. It is a part of the kuswar, a range of sweets typically prepared during Christmas. It is also associated with weddings. The word doce means sweet in Portuguese.

The sweet is made by stirring boiled split Bengal gram, ground coconut paste, and sugar over a low flame and adding ghee while cooking. The mixture is then rolled out while still hot and cut into squares or other shapes.
