= Sanna (dish) =

Indian savoury rice cake

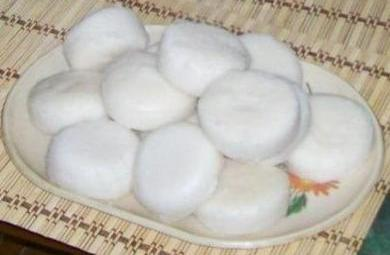
- Sannas
- Place of origin: India
- Region or state: Konkan division, Goa, Damaon and Canara
- Similar dishes: White sugar sponge cake

A sanna is a spongy, steamed, and savoury unfilled dumpling originally made of red rice, black lentil and coconut in the Konkan region, by the western coast of the Indian subcontinent. They originated in Goa and Damaon, Bombay and Bassein (Vasai). They are especially popular among Goans, both the Goan Hindus and Goan Christians, and also among the Konkani migrants outside Konkan in Karachi, Sindh, Gujarat, Karnataka and Kerala. They are also made by the people of Konkan division, such as the Kupari of the Bombay East Indian community.

Hindus normally use urad dal, coconut water and coconut milk for fermentation. Catholic Christian sannas consist of two types: Those made from the toddy of coconut flowers, and those sannas made using the sap-toddy of the coconut palm. Though both of them require the same varieties of rice, sannas are commonly made with coconut for fermentation, unlike idlis made by adding yeast. Sannas are made on special days such as Ganesh Chaturthi, Sonsar Padvo/ Yugadi and Makar Sankranti, Catholic Christians generally prepare them for church feasts, christenings and weddings. Sometimes a sweet version is made with jaggery, known as godachi sanna.

Mangalorean Catholic cuisine on special days is incomplete without sannas. They are a much-loved delicacy served with bafat, a spicy pork curry prepared with a medley of powdered spices. Sannas are also served alongside chicken or mutton curries, and also with beef prior to the beef bans in India. They can be eaten for breakfast with coconut chutney or saambhar, or with coconut milk sweetened with jaggery and flavoured with cardamom.

In present days, the unavailability or ban of toddy in certain places, the difficult and lengthy process of extracting fresh coconut milk has made the dish an occasional delicacy, prepared during Konkani celebrations only. Sometimes, the dish is completely substituted by idlis, made of white rice and yeast-based batter.

== See also ==
- Bombay Sapphire
- Cuisine of Karnataka
- Dhokla
- Feni (Goa)
- List of fermented foods
- List of Indian breads
- List of steamed foods
- Puttu
- Rava idli
