= Kue kembang goyang =

Indonesian and Malaysian snack

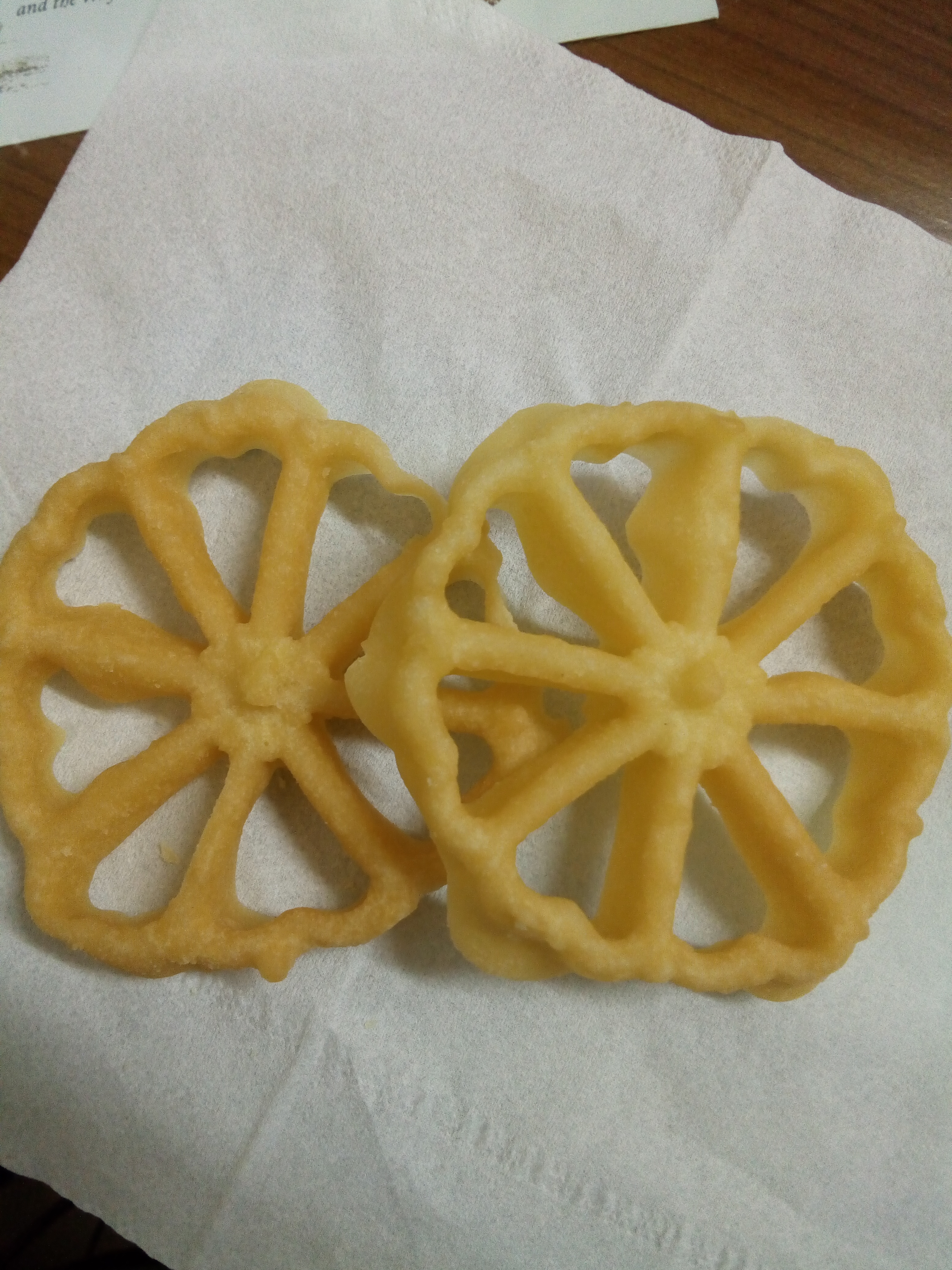
- Kue kembang goyang
- Type: Cake, kue
- Course: Snack
- Place of origin: Indonesia and Malaysia
- Main ingredients: Flour, sugar, milk, baking powder

Kue kembang goyang or kuih loyang is an Indonesian cuisine and Malaysian cuisine flower-shaped traditional snack (kuih), associated with Betawi cuisine and Malay cuisine.

== Etymology ==
Translated into English, the word kembang goyang means a shaking flower (kembang). Kue kembang goyang is made of rice flour which is mixed with eggs, sugar, a pinch of salt, coconut milk, and sometimes also food coloring. The mixture will be fried after heating the oil using the kembang goyang mold. After the oil and kembang goyang mold are hot, the mold is then put into the dough and then put into the hot oil again with some slight shakes until the dough is unattached.

== See also ==
- Indonesian cuisine
- Malaysian cuisine
