= Anuradha N. Naik =

Indian botanist

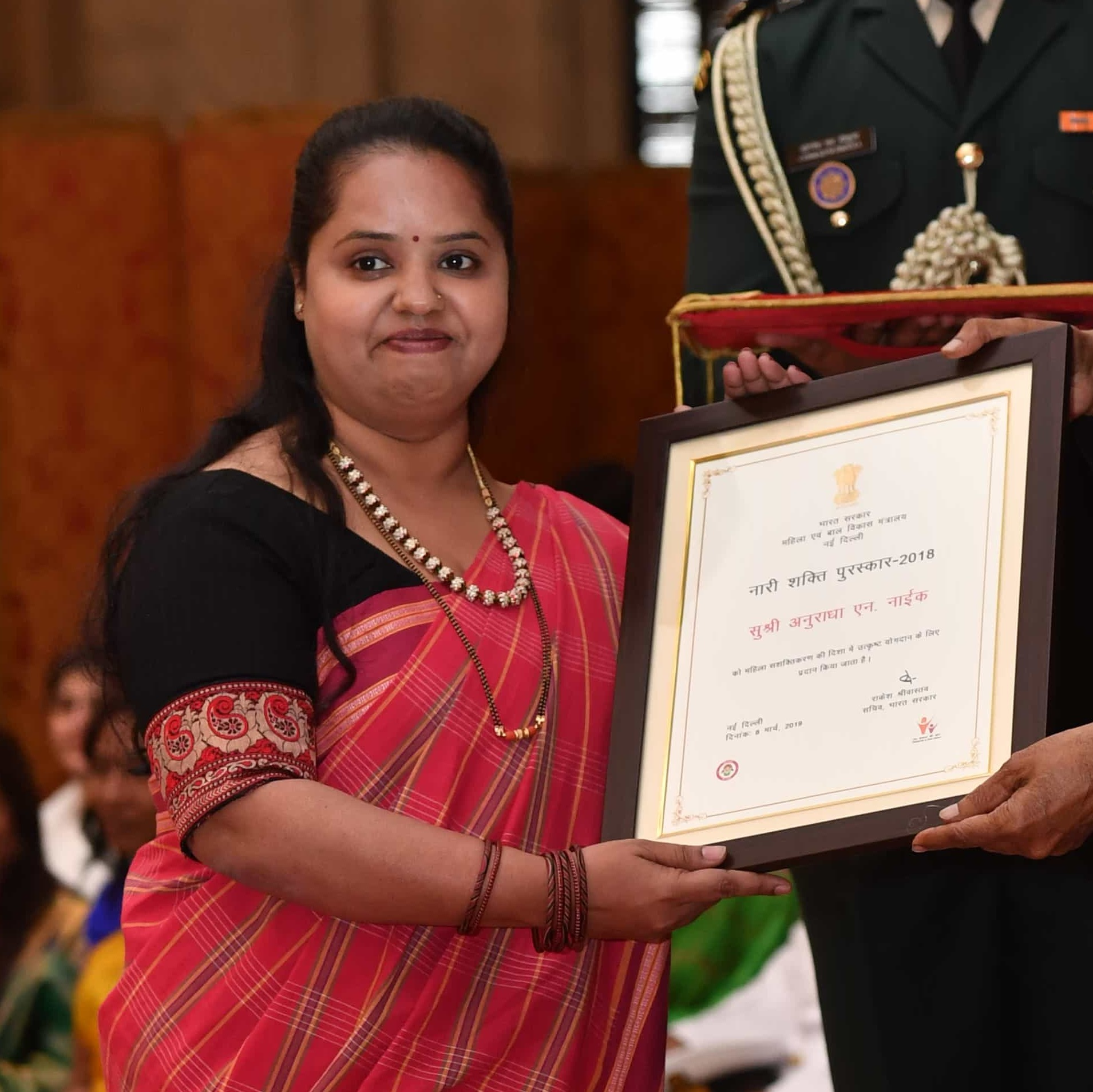
- Born: 20th century
- Education: Goa University
- Occupation: Researcher
- Employer(s): National Institute of Oceanography (NIO) & Indian Council of Agricultural Research's Central Coastal Agricultural Research Institute (CCARI)
- Known for: creating the Khola Canacona Chilli Cultivators Group

Anuradha N. Naik is an Indian researcher working at the Central Coastal Agricultural Research Institute (CCARI) in Goa. She received the 2018 Nari Shakti Puraskar for her work supporting tribal women in cultivating Khola chillies.

== Early life ==
Anuradha N. Naik comes from Goa and studied in the department of Botany at Goa University.

== Career ==
Naik worked as a researcher at the National Institute of Oceanography (NIO) and then at the Indian Council of Agricultural Research's Central Coastal Agricultural Research Institute (CCARI). Whilst at CCARI, she noticed the red Khola chillies lying in the sun to dry when visiting Cabo de Rama. The chillies take their name from the village of Khola and are only grown on hillsides in the Canacona region during the monsoon season.

The tribal women cultivating the chillies were at first reluctant to discuss their growing techniques with Naik, but she persuaded them of the value of scientific research. She helped the women to form a community organisation, the Khola Canacona Chilli Cultivators Group, which packages and sells the chillies at market. The group was awarded the Plant Genome Saviour Community Award and Naik received the 2018 Nari Shakti Puraskar. The latter is India's highest civilian award only for women and Naik was the first Goan to win it.

In January 2020, the Khola chili was given geographical indication status and trials were announced aiming to broaden its cultivation area, although Naik expressed concerns about growing it on flatlands. She had turned her attention to other local crops such as Harmal chillies from Agaçaim and Taleigão, and okra from St Estevav island.
