= Ros omelette =

Street food from Goa, India

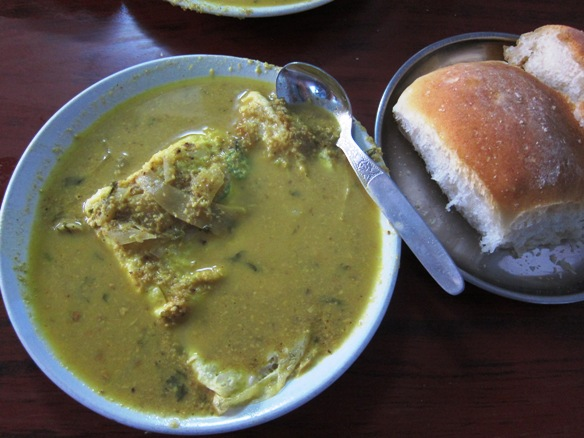
- A typical ros omelette preparation accompanied by two Goan breads
- Alternative names: Ras omelette
- Type: Curry over omelette accompanied by Goan poee
- Course: Snack food
- Place of origin: India
- Region or state: Goa
- Serving temperature: Hot
- Main ingredients: Xacuti (or gravy) of Mutton curry/chicken or chickpeas poured over an omelette of eggs, onions, herbs and green chili peppers
- Variations: Xacuti can be of mushrooms or cauliflower

Ros omelette, also known as ras omelette, is a snack and street food in the Goan cuisine of India. Ros means "gravy" in Konkani. It is a spicy gravy of either chicken or chickpeas, which is often similar to xacuti which is commonly seen in the Goan Catholic style of cooking. It's believed that only the lucky ones get the pieces of Chicken/Mutton in their Ros(curry). If it is not a xacuti then it is probably a spicy gravy consisting of onions, curry leaves, black mustard seeds, scraped coconut and spices mostly prepared by Goan Hindus. Ingredients such as mushrooms or cauliflower are also commonly used. The omelette contains eggs, herbs, finely chopped green chili peppers, onions (or shallots), finely chopped fresh green coriander and salt, with many variations. The ros is cooked separately. The hot ros is poured over the freshly fried omelette and served with Goan bread (Poee).

Ros omelette is traditionally sold by food carts in towns of Goa.
