= Harmal chilli =

Chilli variety grown in Goa, India

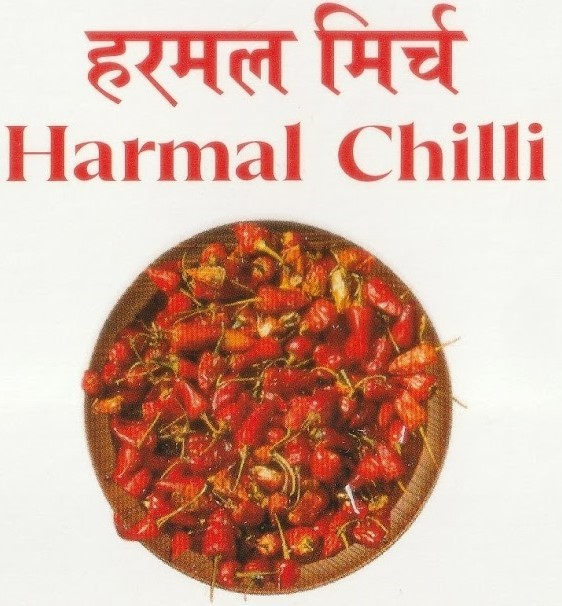
- Closeup view of special cover released on 17 December 2021 for Harmal Chilli
- Species: Capsicum annuum
- Origin: Goa, India
- Scoville scale: 28,200 SHU

The Harmal chilli is a variety of chilli mainly grown in the Indian state of Goa.

== Name ==
It is named after its place of origin, the coastal village of Harmal (now Arambol), located in Pernem, Goa. This smooth red chilli with medium to high pungency has been grown for over 200 years in Goa and is used in the preparation of Chicken Xacuti, Vindaloo and other Goan dishes.

=== Local name ===
It is known as Harmal mirsang - Mirsang in the state language of Konkani means chilli.

== Description ==
=== Cultivation ===
The Harmal chilli is predominantly grown in the lateritic soil of Arambol, Goa, where it thrives in household gardens.

=== Physical Characteristics ===
This variety of chilli measures 2.7-3.7 cm in length, exhibits a reddish-brown color, and features a smooth skin texture.

=== Pungency and Usage ===
Noted for its high pungency, even a small quantity of Harmal chilli powder is sufficient to add significant flavor to dishes. Due to its intense heat, it is often blended with other spices (masalas) to create iconic Goan culinary preparations like Chicken Xacuti Masala, Garam Masala, Khatkhatem, Recheado Masala.

== Photo Gallery ==
Actual photos from Lavu Ankush Thakur - the main applicant for GI Tag from The Harmal-Pernem Chilli (Mirchi) Growers Association.

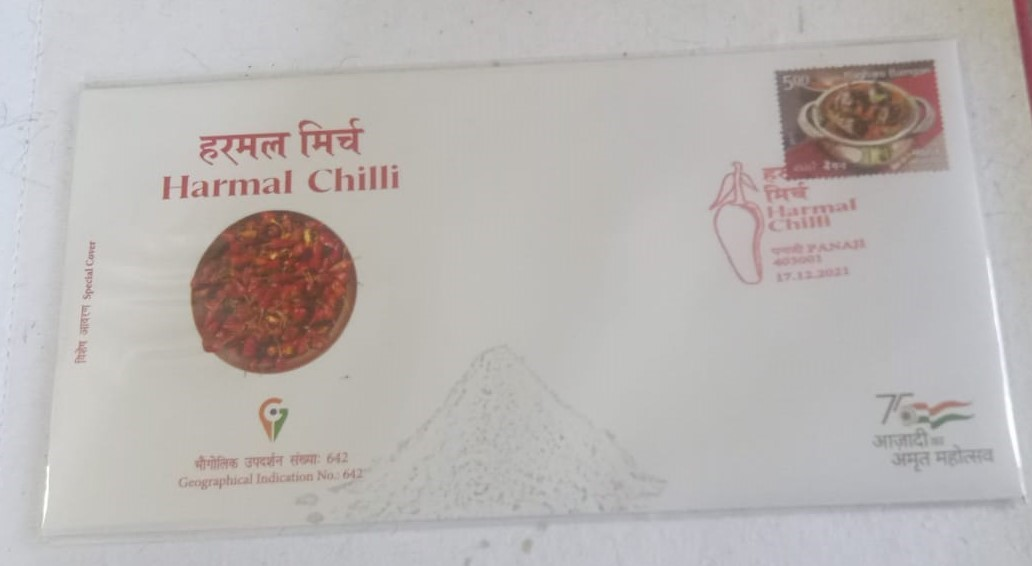
Special cover released on 17 December 2021 for Harmal Chilli by India Post - front side

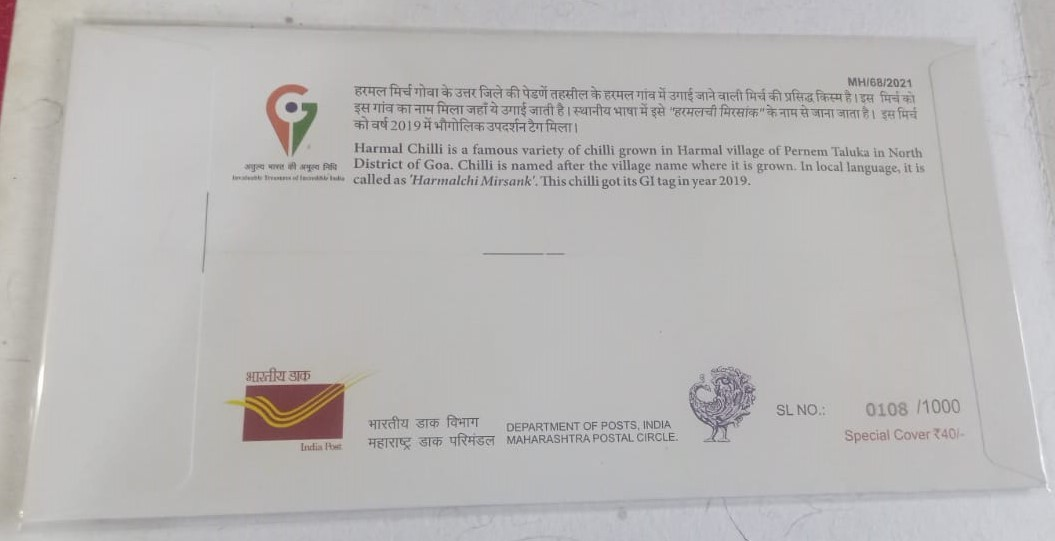
Special cover - back side

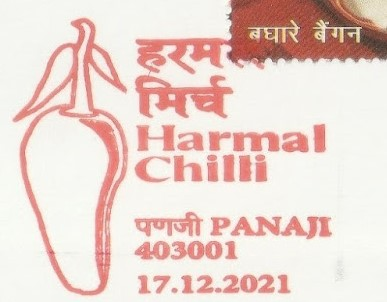
Special cancellation (a unique postmark that is issued to commemorate a special event or occasion)

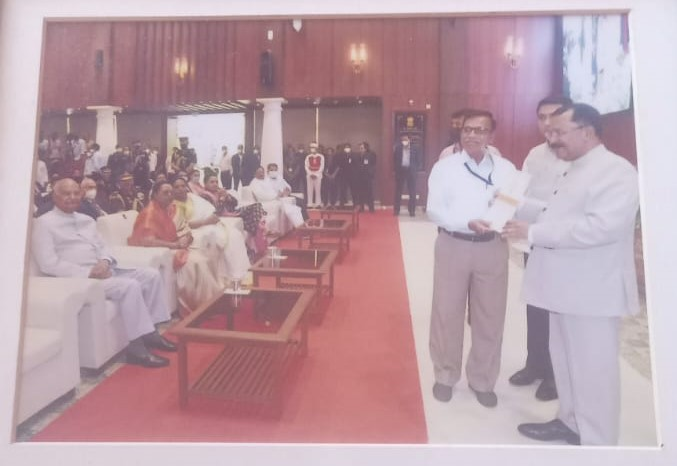
Lavu Thakur received a Certificate of Appreciation from the Governor of Goa, in the presence of CM Pramod Sawant and President Ram Nath at Raj Bhavan, recognizing his efforts in securing the prestigious GI certification for Harmal Chilli.

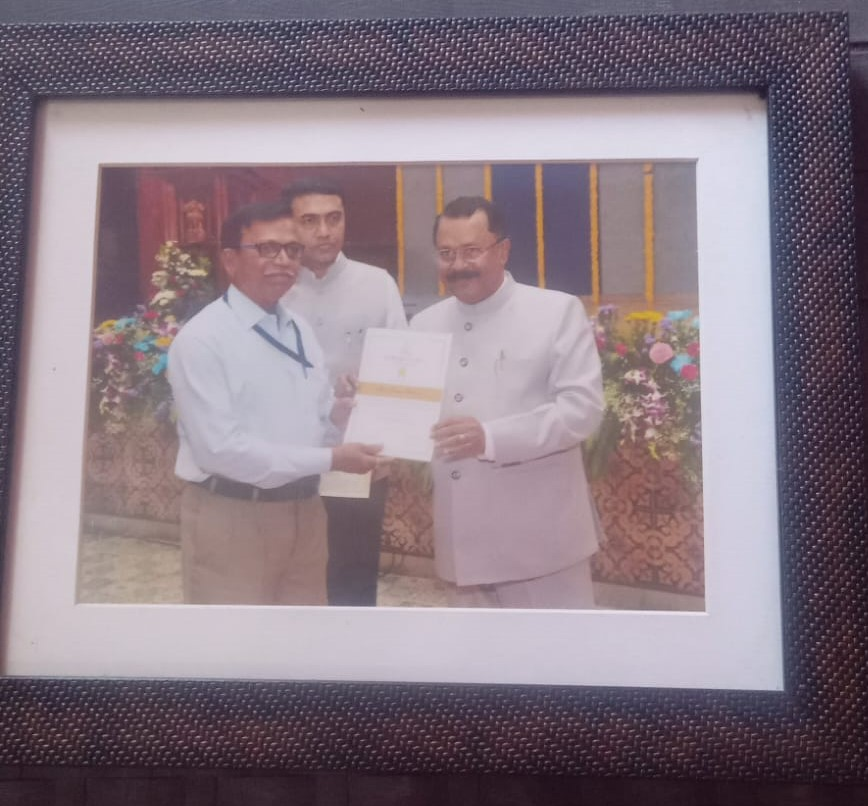
Close-up photo of Lavu Thakur receiving Certification of Award

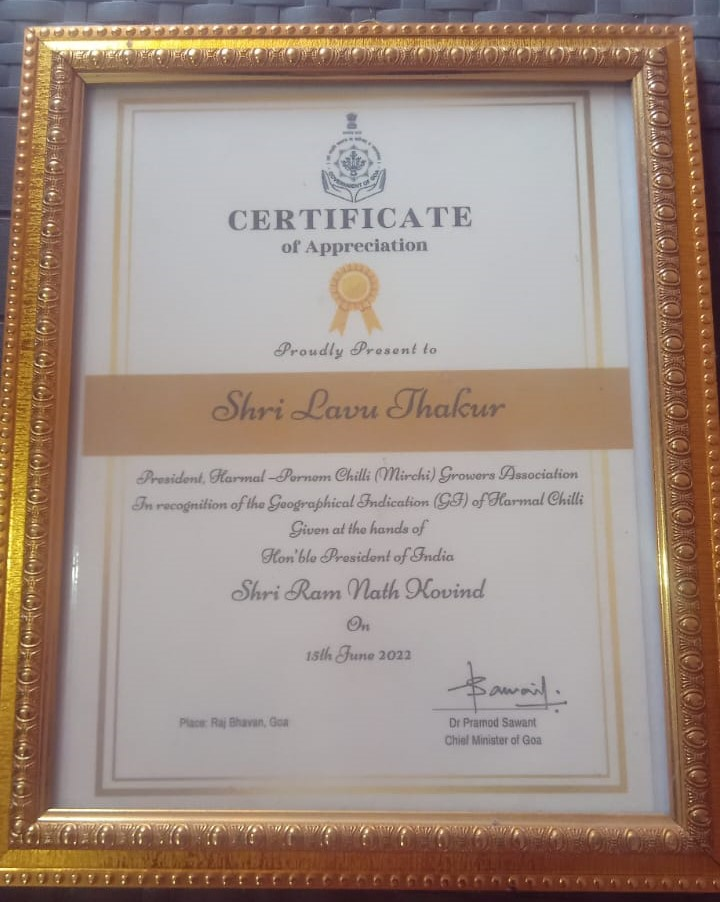
Certificate of Appreciation received of Lavu Thakur from the Governor of Goa, in the presence of CM Pramod Sawant and President Ram Nath at Raj Bhavan

== Geographical indication ==
It was awarded the Geographical Indication (GI) status tag from the Geographical Indications Registry under the Union Government of India on 14 September 2021 (valid until 13 January 2029).

The Harmal-Pernem Chilli (Mirchi) Growers Association from Pernem, proposed the GI registration of Harmal Chilli. After filing the application in May 2020, the chilli was granted the GI tag in 2021 by the Geographical Indication Registry in Chennai, making the name "Harmal Chilli" exclusive to the chilies grown in the region. It thus became the second chilli variety from Goa after Khola Chilli and the 3rd type of goods from Goa to earn the GI tag.

== See also ==
- Goa Mankurad Mango
- Khola Chilli
- Goa Cashew (Kaju or Caju)
