= Poee =

Goan traditional leavened bread

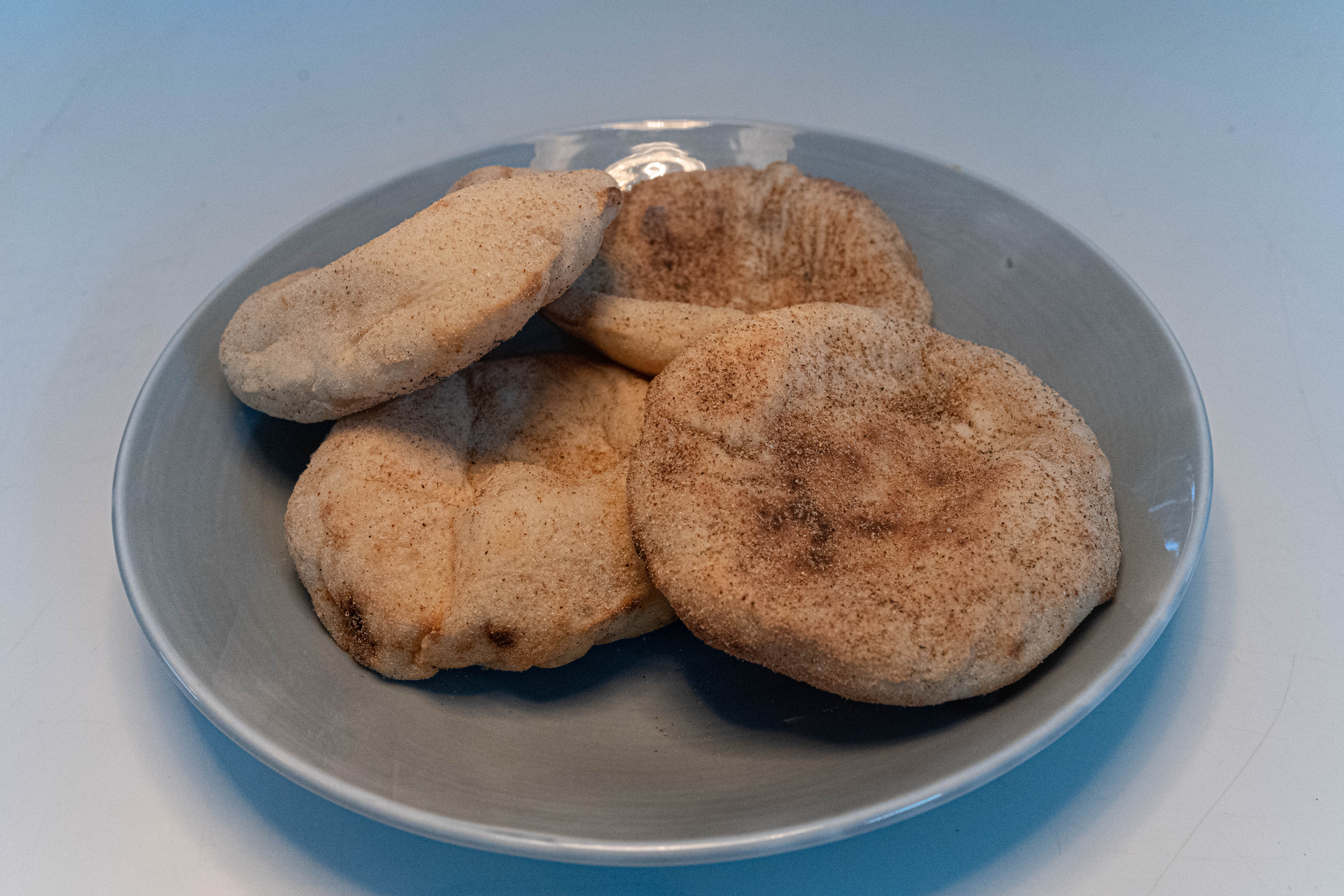
- Alternative names: Poi, Poie
- Type: bread
- Associated cuisine: Goan cuisine

Poee or poie is a leavened bread baked by the traditional bakers called paders in Goa, India, where it is a staple food. It has characteristics similar to a pita bread, notably that it is round, soft, and has a pocket. Coconut palm wine or toddy was traditionally used for the fermenting process but yeast is now used in commercial production. The bread is made from half-maida and half-whole wheat flour.

Bread is a significant part of Goan cuisine, introduced by the Portuguese in the early 17th century. According to Chef Hussain Shahzad, Goa is the only state in India with traditional leavened breads. According to Vogue India, in 2018 poee was becoming increasingly popular outside of Goa. Ross poee, a dish of an omelet, xacuti and poee, is a typical item of Goan home cooking.

Poee traditionally was prepared by fermenting it with toddy for two days, rolling it into a ball, flattening it, and baking it on the floor of a wood-fired oven. This differentiates it from pao, which uses the same dough but is baked in a pan. In a traditional wood-fire oven, the baking time is under a minute. In professional bakeries, poee is generally baked before pao because it requires hotter temperatures.
