= Goan cuisine =

Culinary tradition

Goan cuisine consists of regional foods popular in Goa, India. Rice, seafood, coconut, vegetables, meat, bread, pork and local spices are staples of Goan cuisine. Use of kokum and vinegar is another distinct feature. Goan food is considered incomplete without fish.

The cuisine of Goa originated from its Konkani roots, and was influenced by the 451 years of Portuguese rule and the Sultanate rule that preceded the Portuguese. Many Catholic dishes are either similar to or variants of their Portuguese counterparts in both naming or their use of ingredients.

== Seafood ==
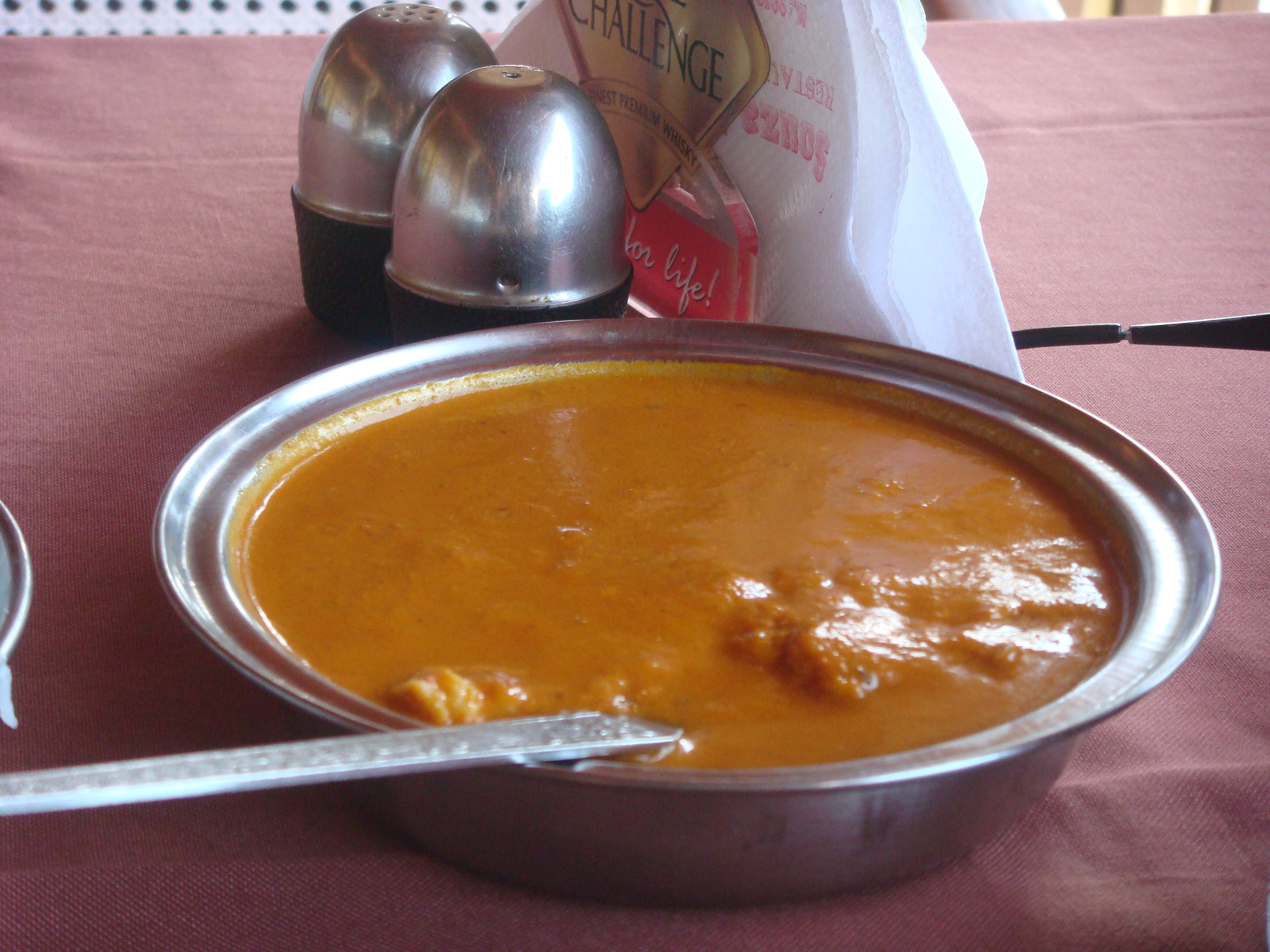
Goan prawn curry, a popular dish throughout the state.

The cuisine of Goan people is mostly seafood-based; the staple foods are rice and fish. Kingfish (Visvonn विस्वण or Isvonn इस्वण) is one of the most commonly eaten varieties of fish. Other fish varieties include pomfret, shark, tuna, sardines, and mackerel. Among the shellfish are crabs, prawns, tiger prawns, lobster, squid, and mussels. The cuisine of Goan Catholics is heavily influenced by Portuguese cuisine. The use of vinegar, for example, is very prominent, specifically toddy vinegar, which is made from coconut sap that is retrieved from stems, and is then left to ferment for four to six months.

== Introduction of new foods ==
The Portuguese introduced cashew nuts (now cultivated widely and popularly known as Goa cashews), pineapples, guavas, potatoes, and tomatoes from Latin America to Goa, and consequently the rest of India. Chillies are the most important aspect of Goan cuisine; they were introduced by the Portuguese and became very popular in wider Indian cuisine. One of Goa's beloved dishes is called sorpotel, which is made from pork. A classic example of Portuguese influence on the food of Goa is that the cuisine includes vinegar, an otherwise uncommon ingredient in traditional Indian cooking. Before the coming of the Portuguese, the Goan diet used to include flatbreads such as rotis and chappatis. The Portuguese brought with them the distinctive bread known as pão. Since then, bread has become an integral part of the diet for Goans.

== Goan Hindu cuisine ==
Goan Hindu cuisine in Goa is mainly pescetarian and lacto-vegetarian, from which it originates. Goan Hindu cuisine is mild, with use of tamarind and kokum for souring, and jaggery for sweetening. It uses spices such as asafoetida, fenugreek, curry leaves, mustard, and urad dal. Onion and garlic are also used. It also includes vegetables, such as lentils, pumpkins, gourds, bamboo shoots, and roots. The medium of cooking is coconut oil.

Well-known Goan Hindu dishes include:

- Humann (हुमण) — Fish curry, also known as kadī (कडी) or āmbat (आंबट), with steamed rice (शीत/भात)
- Fried fish (तळील्लें नूस्तें)
- Fish suke (सुकें नूस्तें) or dhabdhabit — Dry spicy preparation of fish, served as a side dish
- Fish udid methi/uddamethi (उद्दमेथी) — Curry consisting of fenugreek and mackerel; a vegetarian version of this dish is also prepared using hog plums (or anything sour and tangy, such as pieces of raw mango)
- Kismur (किस्मुर) — A side dish normally consisting of dried fish (mostly mackerel or shrimp), onions, and coconut
- Sungtache dangar (डांगर) — Goan prawn cutlets
- Kalputi — A dish normally prepared from the head of a large fish, with onions and coconut
- Bhājī/shāk (भाजी/शाक) — A generic term for stews, curries, and stir-fried dishes made from different vegetables and fruits
- Bhaji — Fried fritters with besan (chickpea) batter. Different kind of bhajis can be made by changing the vegetable used with the besan. Common bhajis include those containing onion or chilies.
- Khatkhate (ख़तखतें)
- Varan — A lentil preparation often made with coconut milk tempered with mustard, curry leaves, and chilies, served as an accompaniment to rice for the Naivedya, prepared during all Hindu festivals, and an integral part of wedding feasts.
- Tondāk (तोंडाक) — A dish with beans and cashews as the primary ingredients
- Different varieties of sweets made from rice and lentils, such as payasu, patoli, madgane and kheer. (गोड्शें)
- Different varieties of pickles and papads (लोणचे आनी पापड)
- Solanchi kadi (सोलांची कडी) — A spicy coconut and kokum curry

== Goan Catholic cuisine ==
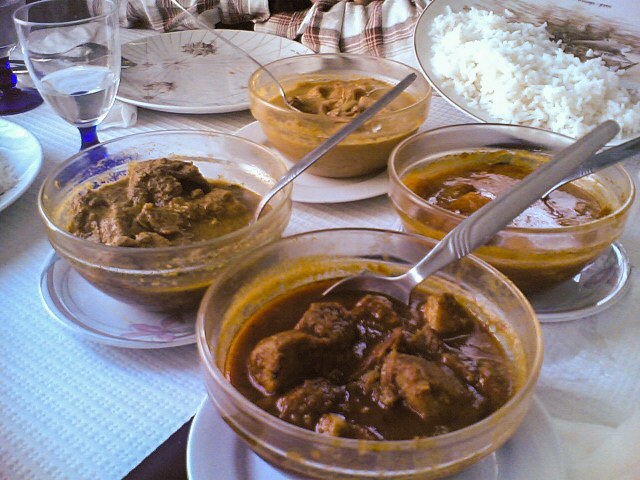
Pork vindaloo is a popular Goan curry dish in the state and around the world.

Goan Catholic cuisine in Goa is a fusion of Goan Hindu and Portuguese cooking styles. Vinegar (made from the toddy of local coconut trees) is used to give a tangy taste to the meat dishes.

=== Main dishes ===
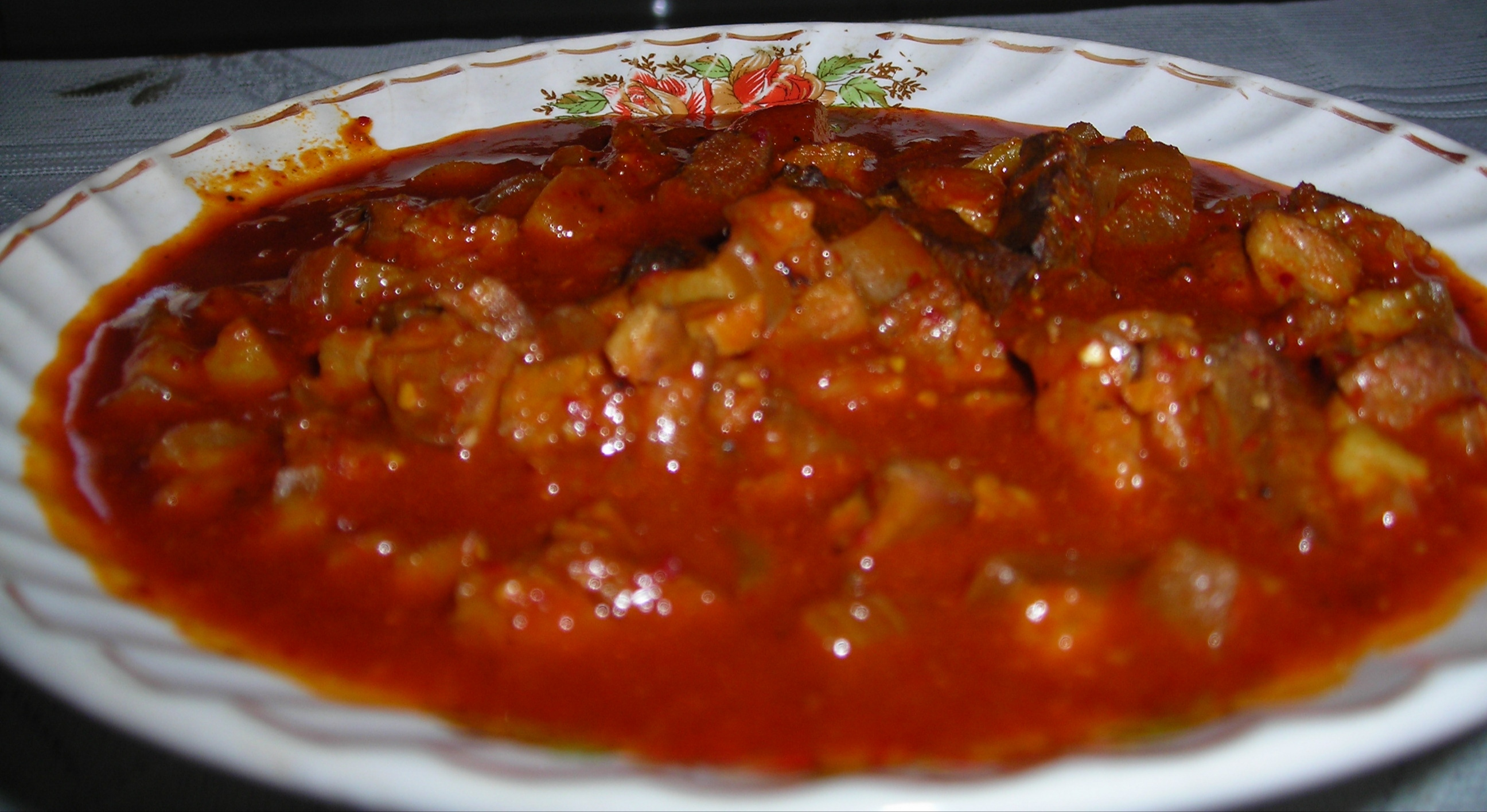
‘Sorpotel’, a piquant pork gravy

Common Goan Catholic dishes include:

- Ambott tîk — A spicy and sour curry prepared with fish.
- Jeerem-meerem — A spicer, less sour version of the above.
- Balchanv (balichão) — A pickled curry made with prawns.
- Mol (mole de peixe) — A pickled curry made with fish.
- Cafreal — A masala marinade mostly used for chicken or fish made from coriander leaves, green chilies, and other spices.
- Canja de galinha – A type of chicken broth served with rice and chicken.
- Chamuça — A Goan/Portuguese derivative of the samosa.
- Choris (chouriço) — A spicy pork sausage.
- Croquettes — Fried minced beef rolls, a common snack among Goan Catholics and the Portuguese.
- Feijoada — A stew brought by the Portuguese. It is made with meat (beef or pork), beans, and cabbage.
- Goan soup
- Roast beef and beef tongue — Commonly served entrees at Goan celebrations.
- Ros omelette — An omelette drowned in spicy chicken or chickpea gravy and served with pão (Luso-Goan bread)
- Samarachi koddi — Goan curry made with fresh and dried prawns
- Sanna – A moist spongy rice cake; a variant of idli
- Solantule kodi — A picquant coconut milk and kokum curry
- Sorpotel (Sarapatel) — A very spicy pork dish eaten with sannas or pão (Goan bread – spelled the same way as in Portugal)
- Vindalho — A spicy curry traditionally made with pork. The name is derived from the Portuguese term for ‘garlic’ and ‘wine’ (“vinho e alho” or “vinha d'alhos”) marinade. Contrary to popular versions made outside Goa, a traditional vindalho does not contain any meat besides pork. It also does not contain any potatoes nor is its name related to the Hindi word ‘āloo’ (potato).
- Xacuti (Shâgotî) — Type of curry made with roasted grated coconut and pieces of chicken or lamb.
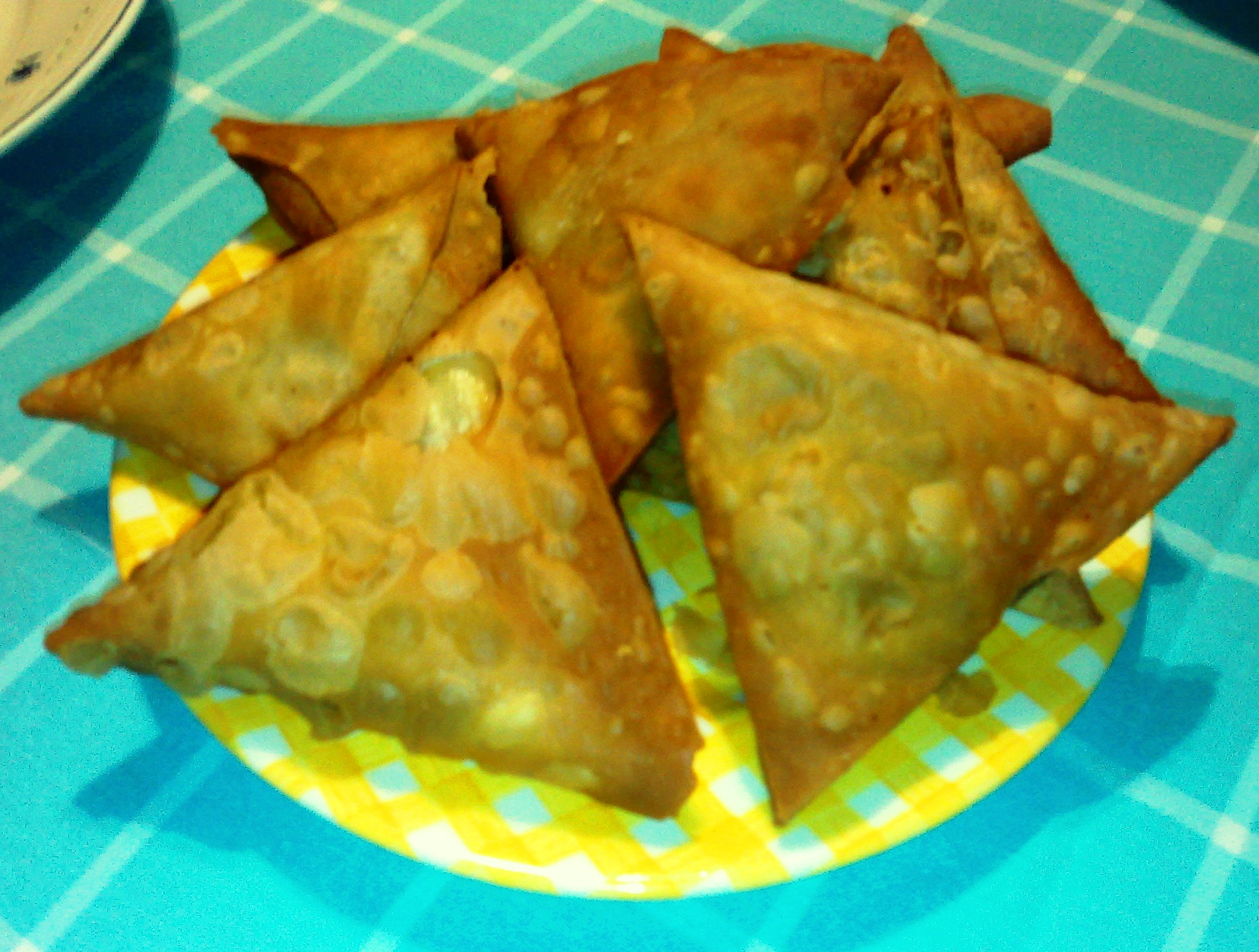
Chamuças, Goan samosas

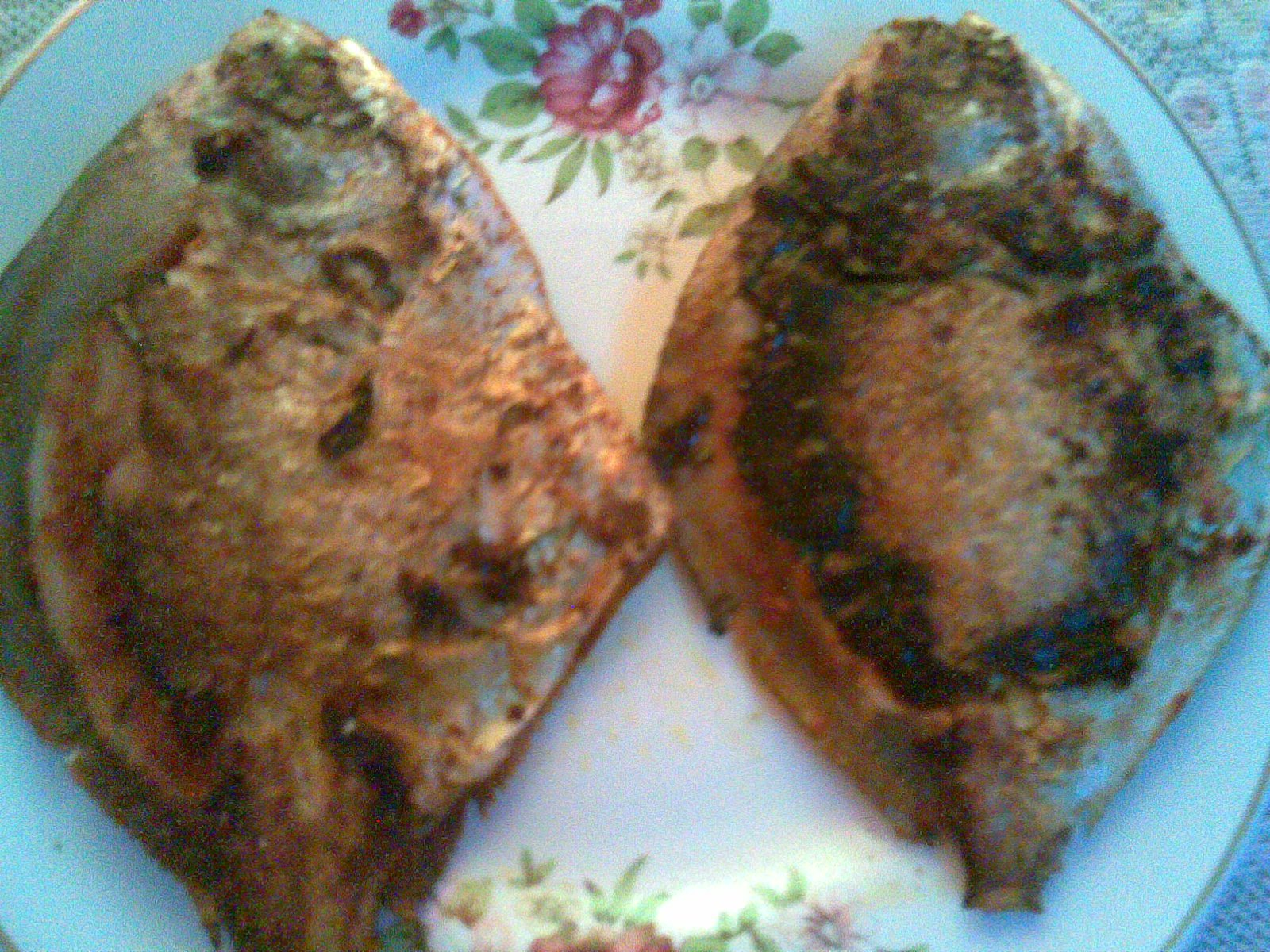
Fried pomfret

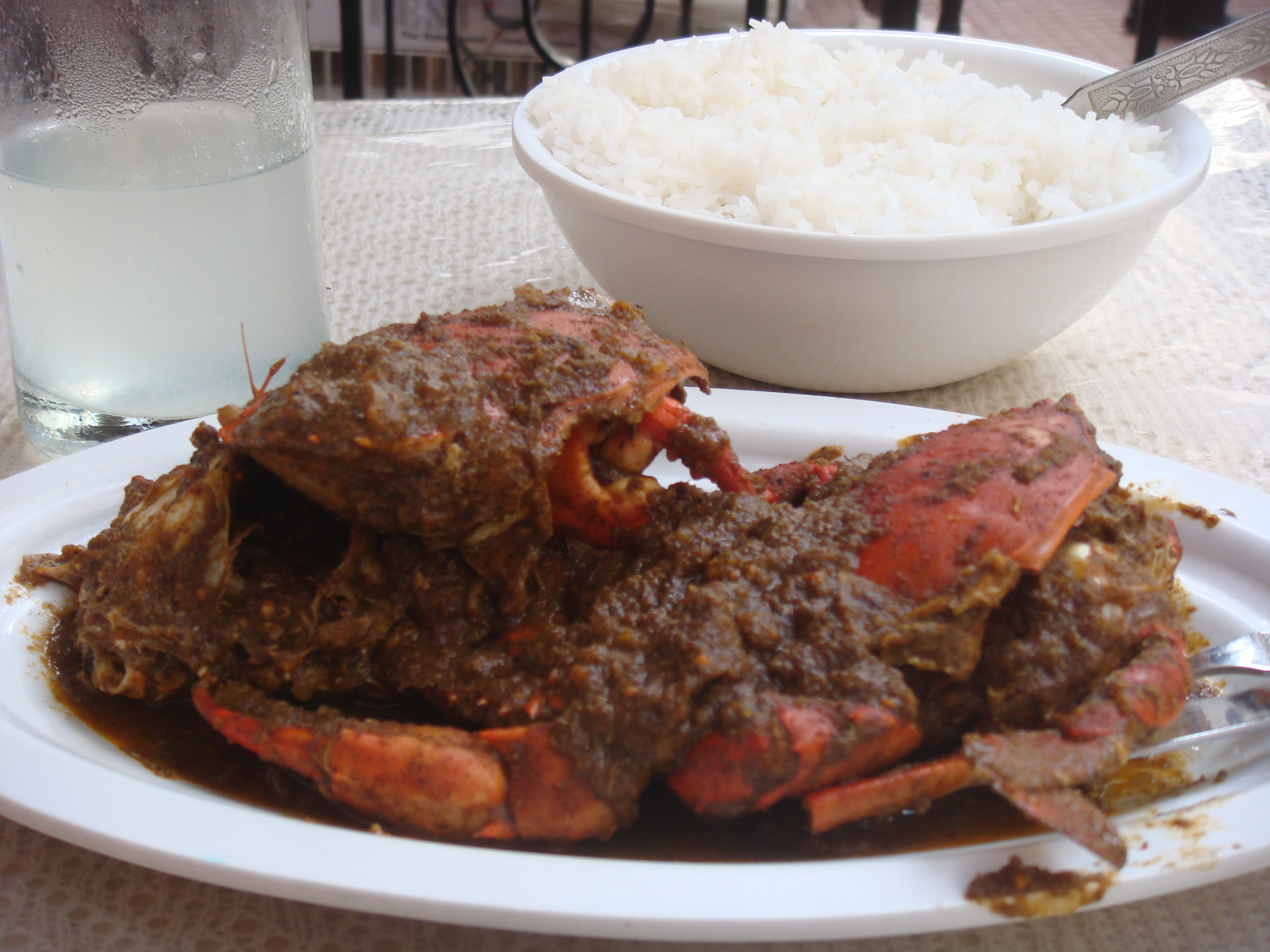
Crab xec xec

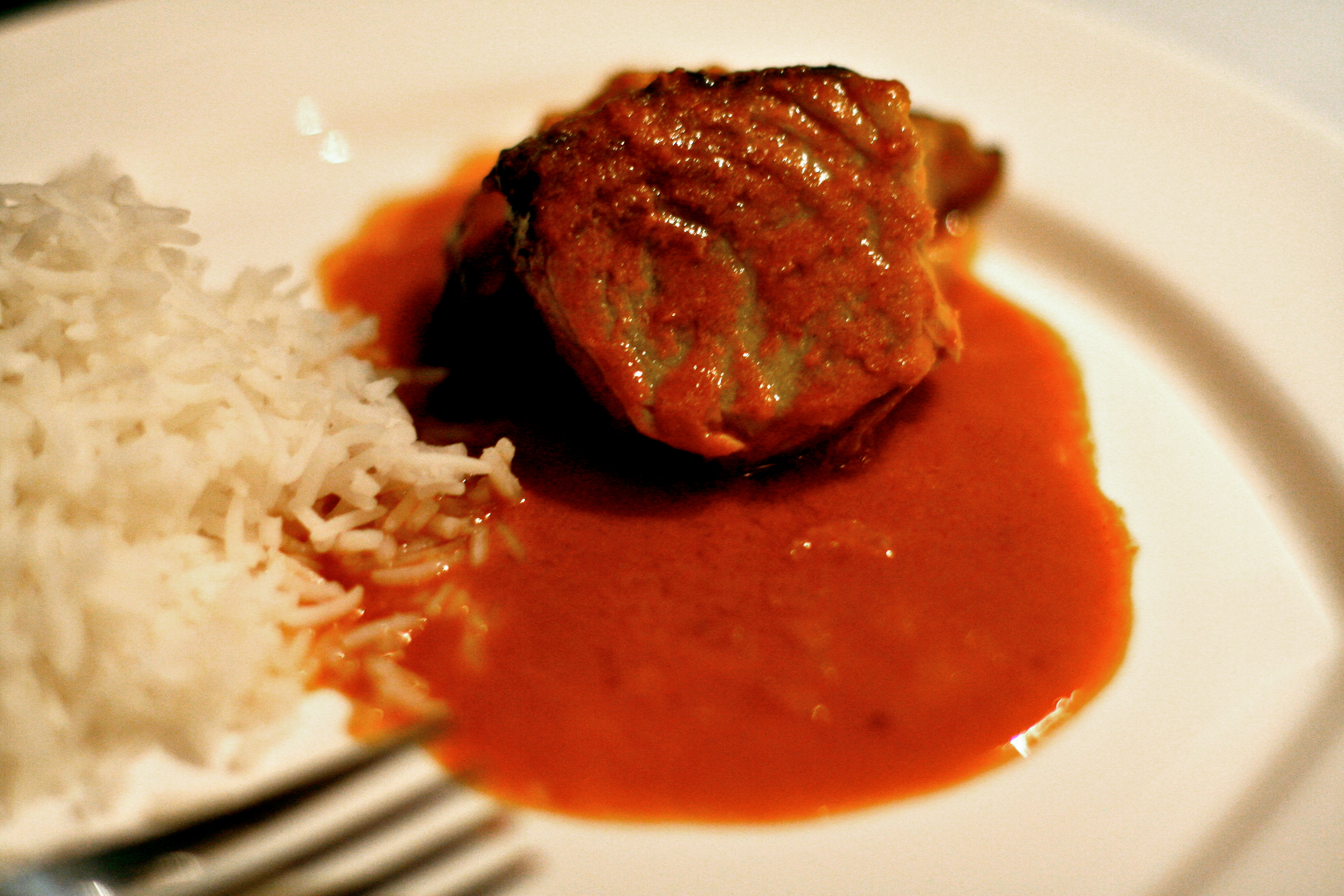
Traditional Goan fish curry

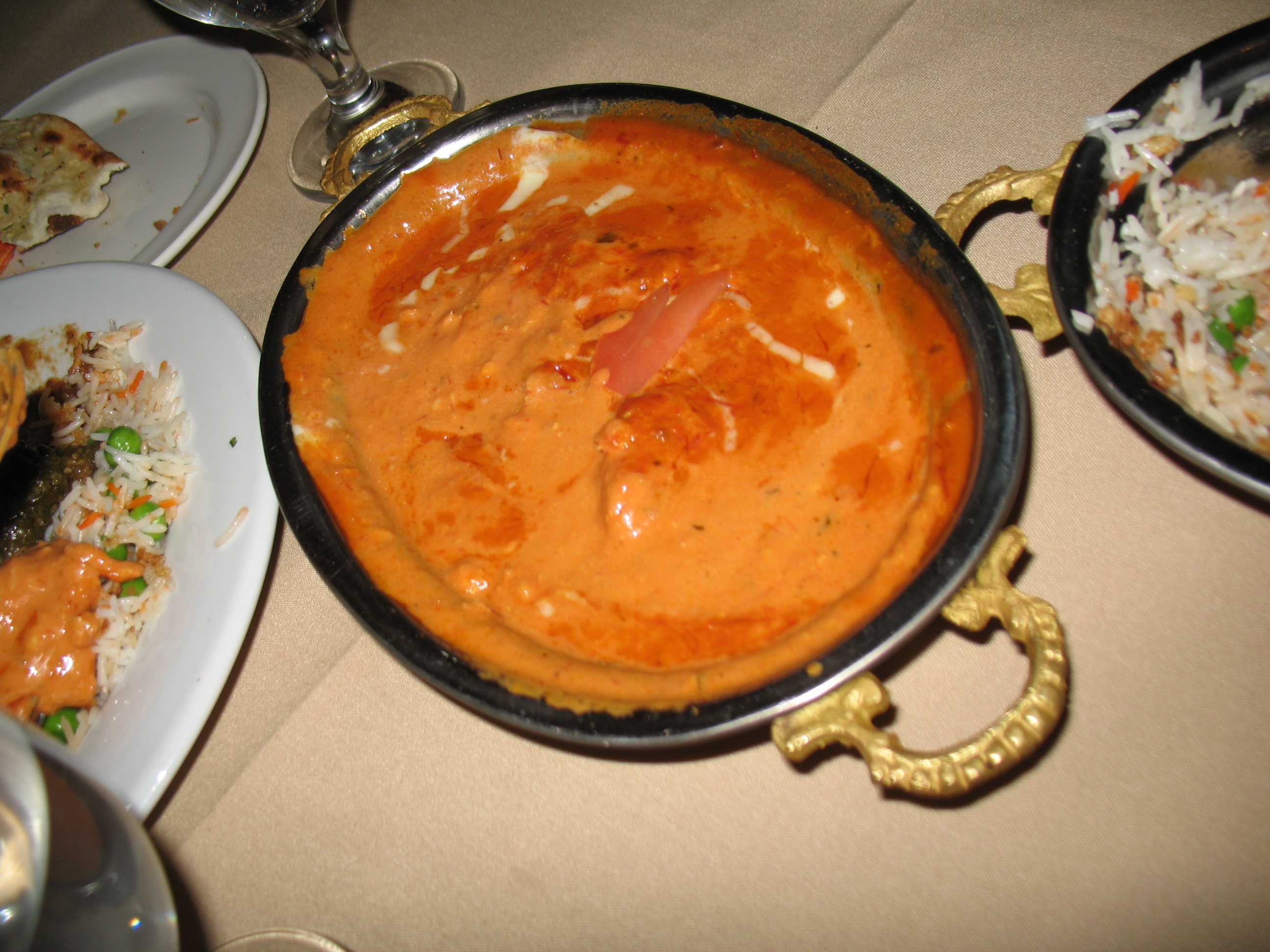
Goan fish masala

Bread is an important part of Goan cuisine. Of Portuguese origin, it is different in Goa from the breads offered in the rest of India. It was around 1550, in the village of Salcete, that the Portuguese began to teach the local population how to prepare these breads. They often include palm wine (‘’toddy‘’) used as a ferment. Local breads include:

- pao (the most common bread, with a brioche-like texture),
- katre pao (a square loaf with pointed corners),
- undo (a soft bread with a real crust),
- kankonn (a round loaf with holes, shaped like a bagel but with a larger diameter; it keeps for a long time),
- and poie, a type of farmhouse bread with an airy crumb.

=== Sweets and desserts ===
Sweets and desserts are known by their Konkani name, ‘Goddxem’. Popular dishes include:

- Arroz doce — A Portuguese sweetened rice custard.
- Bêbîk (Bebinca) — A multi-layered baked pudding traditionally eaten at Christmas.
- Cashew laddus
- nevryo-Sweet fried dumpling with filling made from grated coconut, sugar, poppy seeds, green cardamom, almonds
- khaje
- revdyo
- sakharbhat -Rice with sugar and coconut
- madgane
- payasa
- halwa dali kapa (halwa made from red gram), cashew halwa, mango halwa, banana halwa, pumpkin halwa
- Dodol
- Bebinca
- Patoleo or patoli – A dish of turmeric leaves stuffed with rice, dal, jaggery, and coconut
- Serradura
- Kuswar
- Perada

== See also ==
- Canja de Goa
- Cucumber cake
- Feni
- Urrak
