= Tomato omelette =

Indian breakfast dish prepared mostly in Maharashtra

Tomato Omelette
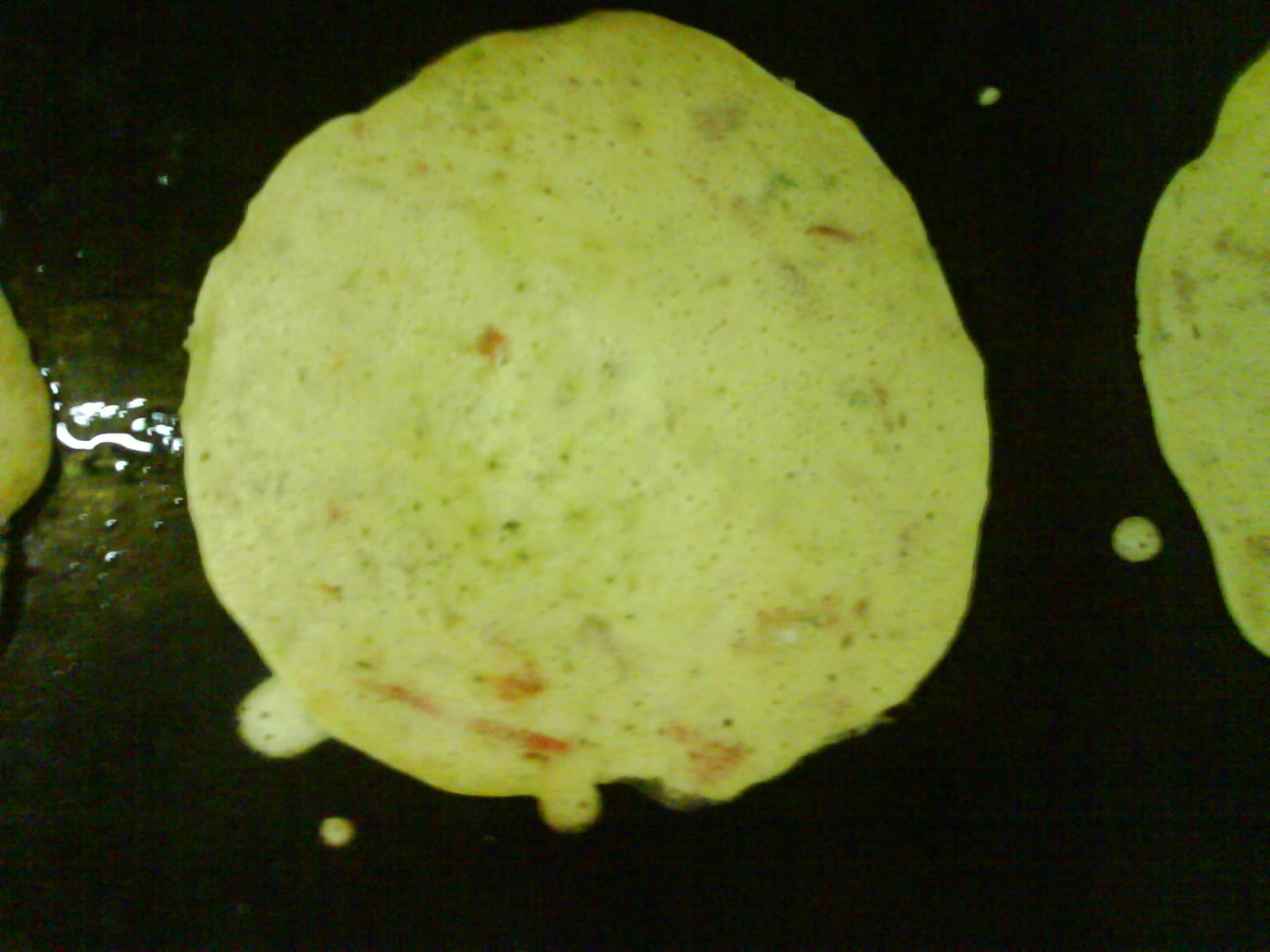
- Alternative names: टॉमॅटो धिरडे
- Type: Pancake
- Place of origin: India
- Region or state: Maharashtra
- Main ingredients: Chickpea flour or besan, water, green chillies, onions, tomatoes

A tomato omelette (Marathi: टॉमॅटो धिरडे) is a breakfast dish prepared mostly in Maharashtra, India. It is referred to as an omelette because of its visual appearance, but this is a misnomer, as it actually contains no egg product or by-product and is vegan. The main ingredient is chickpea flour or besan. Sometimes, it is also made with dosa batter (rice flour and urad dal paste), with a small quantity of besan only to provide binding, in which case it is classified as Uttapam.

A batter of pouring consistency is made with water and chickpea flour; finely chopped green chillies, onions and tomatoes are added. The mix is poured on a hot skillet, brushed with cooking oil and cooked on both sides. Tomato omelettes are served hot with ketchup, coconut chutney, sambar or any other pickle.

It has popularity and easy availability amongst multitudes of restaurants and canteens throughout Maharashtra namely in cities like Pune and Mumbai. It is a popular dish in University canteens, like VJTI and Pune University. While this filling breakfast snack is available across the country, it is generally prepared in Maharashtrian homes along with other similar filling breakfast snacks such as thalipeeth or dhirde.

== See also ==
- Indian omelette
- Cheela, Indian pancake
- List of tomato dishes
