= Mizo chilli =

Chilli variety grown in Mizoram, India

- Species: Capsicum frutescens
- Origin: Mizoram, India
- Scoville scale: 37,153 SHU

The Mizo chilli is a variety of chilli mainly grown in the Indian state of Mizoram. It is a common and widely cultivated crop in Mizoram, and also found in parts of Manipur.

== Name ==
Mizo chilli, also known as Bird's Eye Chilly, is a prized crop in Mizoram and so named after it.

=== Local name ===
It is known as Hmarchte (Hmarcha) or Vaimarcha in Mizo.

== Description ==
=== Cultivation ===
Its long cultivation history, coupled with its popularity and open-pollinating nature, has led to the development of rich genetic diversity, including unique local landraces.

=== Physical characteristics and pungency ===
Within Mizoram alone, three distinct varieties of Mizo chilli are cultivated across different regions as follows:

Grade A	Grade B	Grade C
This variety stands out as the smallest, thinnest, and most pungent, earning it a reputation as the best quality and highest in demand in the market. Notably, its chilli powder can be distinguished by its unique coloration, boasting a shinier red hue that sets it apart from the other two varieties.	Grade B chillies differ from Grade A in terms of thickness and length, being slightly thicker and marginally longer. Additionally, they exhibit a darker red colour when dried and have a slightly milder pungency compared to their Grade A counterparts.	Mizo Chillies of Grade B properties are similar, but this variety stands out with its slightly longer size. Although prices remain relatively consistent across Grades A, B, and C, buyer preference distinctly leans towards Grade A, indicating a market inclination despite minimal price differentiation.

=== Usage ===
It is highly sought after for its intense heat, driving significant exports to neighboring countries like China, Thailand, Vietnam, and Bangladesh, where it is a key ingredient in spicy cuisine, including pickles, chutneys, hot sauces, and noodle dishes.

== Geographical indication ==
It was awarded the Geographical Indication (GI) status tag from the Geographical Indications Registry under the Union Government of India on 23 March 2015 (valid until 26 January 2032).

North Eastern Regional Agricultural Marketing Corporation Ltd (NERAMAC) from Guwahati, proposed the GI registration of Mizo Chilli. After filing the application in January 2012, the chilli was granted the GI tag in 2021 by the Geographical Indication Registry in Chennai, making the name "Mizo Chilli" exclusive to the chilies grown in the region. It thus became the first chilli variety from Mizoram and the first type of goods from Mizoram to earn the GI tag.

== See also ==
- Khola Chilli
- Sirarakhong Hathei chilli
- Naga Mircha
