= Varan bhaat =

Vegan Indian food dish with dal and rice

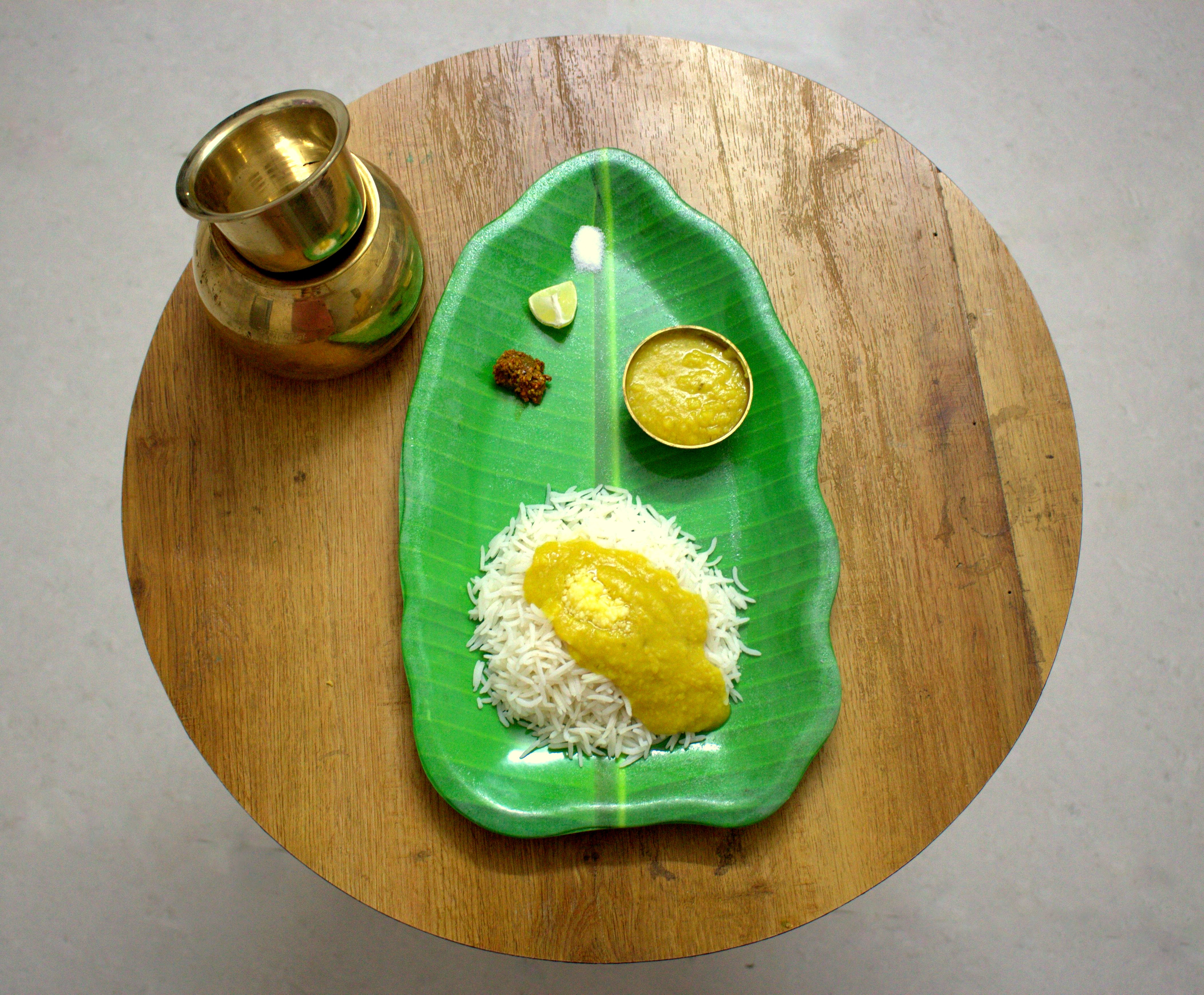
- Varan bhaat
- Place of origin: India
- Region or state: Goa, Maharashtra
- Main ingredients: Pigeon peas; Rice

Varan bhaat is a vegan, Indian food preparation involving pigeon pea dal and rice as its main ingredients. It belongs to Marathi and Goan cuisine. Its other ingredients are turmeric powder, cumin seeds, asafoetida, jaggery and salt.

According to Sanjeev Kapoor, it is a part of a Goan wedding meal. Naivedhya offered to Ganapati on Ganesh Chaturthi includes varan bhaat. It has been described as a favourite dish or comfort food by celebrities such as Priya Bapat, Yatin Karyekar, and the late Bhimsen Joshi. Shobha De describes herself as one who is "as Marathi as varan bhaat", thus considering it as a quintessentially Marathi food preparation. Varan bhaat has been described as "filling and non-spicy" and good to have during the Indian summers. According to Tarla Dalal, the Gujarati preparation "lachko dal" and rice combination is similar to varan bhaat. A CNN story includes it in the list of "40 Mumbai foods we can't live without", describing varan bhaat as "simple and humble... soul satisfying food of Mumbai city".
