= Sirarakhong Hathei chilli =

Chilli variety grown in Manipur, India

- Species: Capsicum annuum
- Origin: Manipur, India
- Scoville scale: 7542 SHU

The Sirarakhong Hathei chilli is a variety of chilli mainly grown in the Indian state of Manipur. It is a widely cultivated crop in Sirarakhong village in the Ukhrul district of Manipur.

== Name ==
The chilli is also known only as Sirarakhong chilli, after the name of the village, or simply Hathei chilli.

=== Local name ===
The word "Ha" means bitter in the local Tangkhul language, and owing to its bitterness, it came to be known as Hathei.

== Description ==
The Sirarakhong Hathei chilli typically measures 8-9 inches in length.

== Geographical indication ==
The chilli was awarded the Geographical Indication (GI) status tag from the Geographical Indications Registry under the Union Government of India on 14/09/2021 (valid until 17/09/2027).

Manipur Organic Mission (MOMA) from Imphal, proposed the GI registration of Sirarakhong Hathei Chilli. After filing the application in January 2017, the chilli was granted the GI tag in 2021 by the Geographical Indication Registry in Chennai, making the name "Sirarakhong Hathei Chilli" exclusive to the chilies grown in the region. It thus became the first chilli variety from Manipur and the seventh type of goods from Manipur to earn the GI tag.

== See also ==
- Mizo chilli
- Naga Mircha
