= Sirarakhong =

Sirarakhong Kampha Kampha
- Village
- Nickname: Kampha
- Location in Manipur, India Sirarakhong (India)
- Coordinates: 25°04′46″N 94°14′07″E
- Country: India
- State: Manipur
- District: Ukhrul

Government
  - Type: Semi
  - Body: VA/Headman

Population
  - Total: 1,243

Languages
  - Official: Tangkhul (Kampha tui)
- Time zone: UTC+5:30 (IST)
- PIN: 795142
- Vehicle registration: MN
- Nearest city: Ukhrul
- Literacy: 92.22%
- Lok Sabha constituency: Outer Manipur
- Vidhan Sabha constituency: Chingai
- Website: manipur.gov.in

Sirarakhong also called as Kampha is a village located west of Ukhrul in Ukhrul district, Manipur state, India. As per 2011 census, the village has a total of 202 households with 1243 persons of which 620 are male while 623 are female. Of the total population, 10.86% are in the age group of 0–6 years. The average sex ratio of the village is 1015 female per 1000 male which is higher than the state's average of 930. The literacy rate of the village is 95.22%.

== Religion ==
Sirarakhong is one of the Tangkhul villages that embraced Christianity very early. For this, the villagers got access to western education right from the coming of Christian missionaries to Ukhrul district. Hundred percent of the inhabitants are Christians. As per 2011 census, the literacy rate of the village was 95.22% which is higher than the state's average of 76.94%.

== People and occupations ==
The village is home to people of Tangkhul Naga tribe. Agriculture is the primary occupation of the inhabitants.

== Notability ==
The Sirarakhong Hathei chilli is a variety of chilli mainly grown in this village.

In Sirarakhong village, Mizo chilli cultivation serves as the primary source of income and holds deep cultural significance. The villagers revere the chilli, even referencing it in a traditional song as a "red cover" enveloping the hills. This reverence culminates in the annual "Hathei Phanit" (Chilli Festival), celebrated since 2010, where the community comes together to honor the chilli's unique qualities and acknowledge it as a divine gift to their community.

=== Geographical indication ===
It was awarded the Geographical Indication (GI) status tag from the Geographical Indications Registry under the Union Government of India on 14/09/2021 (valid until 17/09/2027).

Manipur Organic Mission (MOMA) from Guwahati, proposed the GI registration of Sirarakhong Hathei Chilli. After filing the application in January 2017, the chilli was granted the GI tag in 2021 by the Geographical Indication Registry in Chennai, making the name "Sirarakhong Hathei Chilli" exclusive to the chilies grown in the region. It thus became the first chilli variety from Manipur and the seventh type of goods from Manipur to earn the GI tag.
