= Naga Mircha =

Chilli variety grown in Nagaland, India

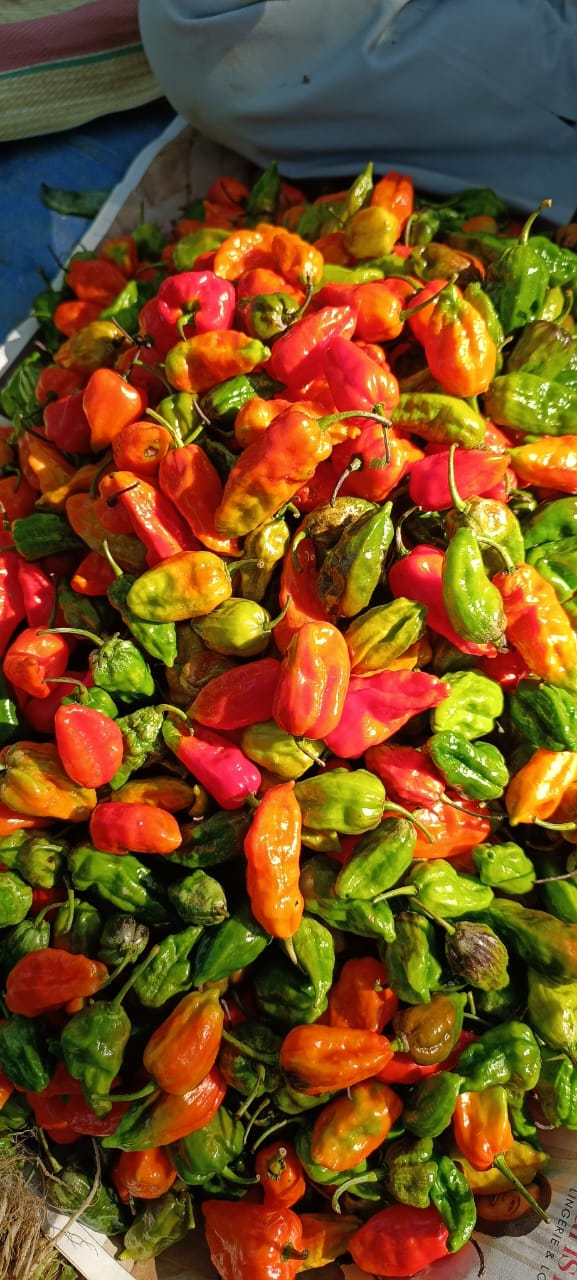
- Species: Capsicum chinense
- Origin: Nagaland, India
- Scoville scale: 1,000,000 SHU

The Naga Mircha is a variety of ghost pepper grown in the Indian state of Nagaland, belonging to the nightshade family Solanaceae. It is the first chilli or even the first of goods of any kind from Nagaland to be awarded a GI tag.

The chilli is a treasure of Nagaland, deeply rooted in the region's lifestyle since introduction from the New World by the Portuguese. For generations, farmers in Nagaland's chilli-growing areas have cultivated Naga Mircha Chilli, relying on it as a primary source of income and livelihood. This iconic chilli is an integral part of Nagaland's culinary identity, inseparably linked to the local community as a staple ingredient.

== Name ==
It is locally also known as "Chudi Chilli", and famously known as Naga Mircha (Chilli from Nagaland) or Raja Mircha, which translates to "King of Chillies" in the local language.

== Description ==
These chillies, one of the world's hottest chillies, transforms from green to vibrant red at maturity. Characterized by its sub-conical to conical shape, it measures 2.5-2.95 cm in width and 5.95-8.54 cm in length, with each fruit weighing 12-16 grams. Notable features include finely wrinkled skin, thin flesh, and an intense, fruity aroma, complemented by an extraordinary pungency that distinguishes this variety.

== Geographical indication ==
It was awarded the Geographical Indication (GI) status tag from the Geographical Indications Registry under the Union Government of India on 02/12/2008 (valid until 21/08/2027).

The Secretary, Department of Horticulture & Agriculture, Government of Nagaland, from Kohima, proposed the GI registration of Naga Mircha. After filing the application in August 2007, the chilli was granted the GI tag in 2008 by the Geographical Indication Registry in Chennai, making the name "Naga Mircha" exclusive to the chilies grown in the region. It thus became the first chilli variety from Nagaland and the first type of goods from Nagaland to earn the GI tag.

== See also ==
- Sirarakhong Hathei chilli
- Mizo chilli
