= Khola, Goa =

Village in Goa, India

Khola
- Village
- Location in Goa, India Khola (India)
- Coordinates: 15.07°N 73.97°E
- Country: India
- State: Goa
- District: South Goa

Languages
  - Official: Konkani
- Time zone: UTC+5:30 (IST)
- PIN: 403702
- Telephone code: 91-08346-XXX XXX
- Vehicle registration: GA
- Nearest city: Canacona
- Website: goa.gov.in

Khola is a village located in Canacona, Goa, India. "Cola" is the variation of the same name.

== Location ==
Located in the northernmost part of Canacona taluk, South Goa, the historic fort of Cabo de Rama Fort is located in this village.

== Notability ==
The Khola chilli stands out with its red hue and elongated shape, making people feel at ease when arriving.

Khola Chilli was awarded the Geographical Indication (GI) status tag from the Geographical Indications Registry under the Union Government of India on 28 August 2019 (valid until 5 August 2028).

== Tourist Attractions ==
Khola (Cola) beach is located at this village.
