= Goan soup =

Soups of Goan cuisine

Canja de Goa (Goan soup) is a typical soup of the Indo-Portuguese cuisine of Goa, Daman and Diu, which once formed part of the Portuguese India, and is inspired by Portuguese soup.

It is prepared with chicken, choris sausage, onion, garlic, rice, water and salt. All the ingredients are cooked together in a saucepan or pressure cooker and chicken broth is added.

According to Goan tradition, it was made for women who gave birth in the family home. After the first birth, the mothers-in-law sent the brides a bottle of port wine and six chickens, to be used in preparing the soup, since this was considered a good food for mothers and convalescents.

It is consumed for breakfast or as a late-morning meal, together with curry from the previous day, sweet mango chutney and salted fish. Sometimes it is transported to the fields by children, in a vessel of clay, for their parents and older siblings working there.

== See also ==
- List of soups
