= Nevryo =

Sweet dumpling

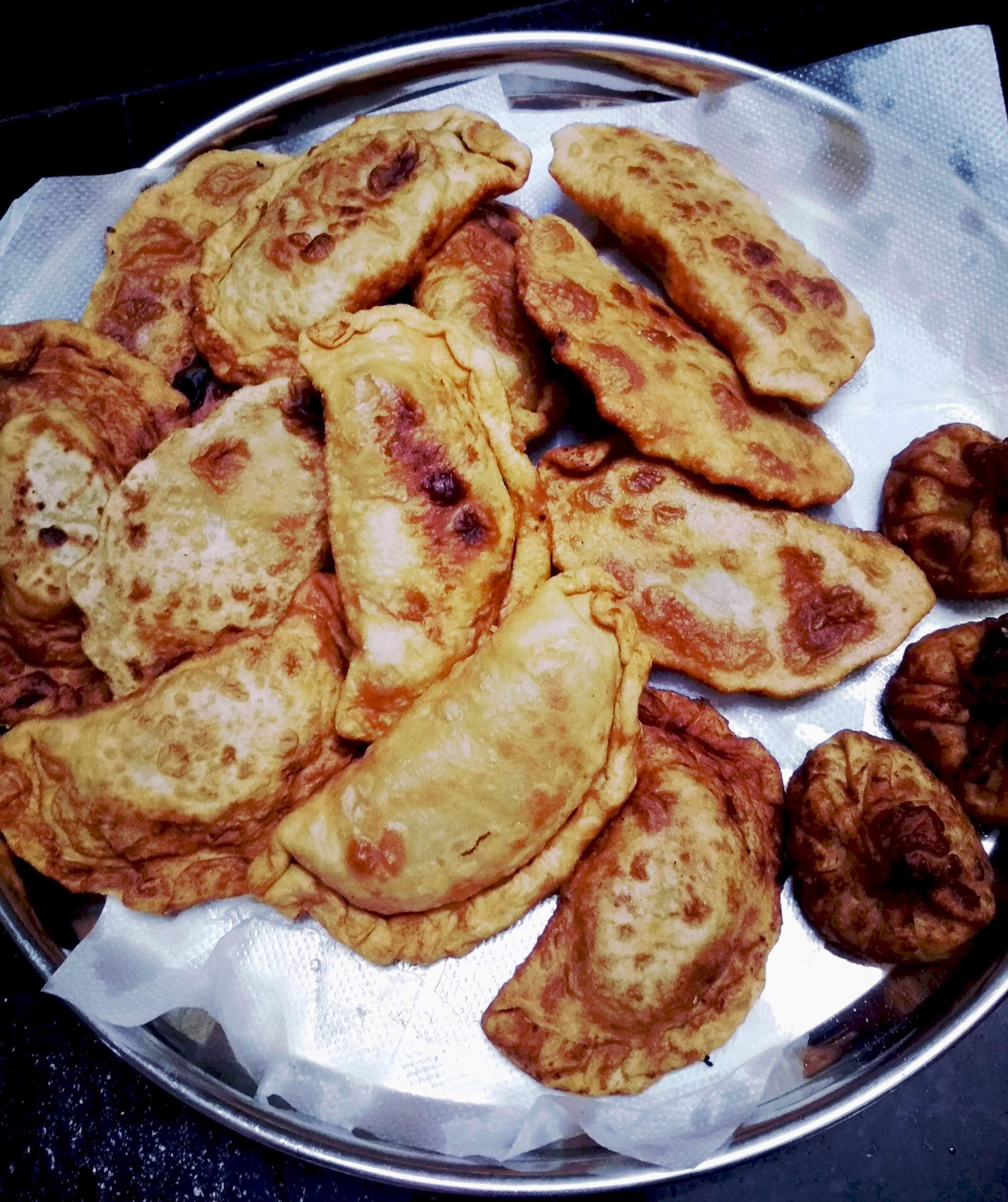
Goan Nevri, with modaks on the right

Nevryo (or Neureo) is an Indian sweet dumpling made predominantly in Dakshina Kannada and Udupi districts of Karnataka and Goa, just before Christmas. It is also prepared during the Hindu festivals of Diwali and Ganesh Chaturthi.

== Ingredients and preparation ==
Fillings made from grated coconut, sugar, poppy seeds, green cardamom, almonds or cashew nuts are wrapped in dough and fried in oil. It is often compared to a gujia stuffed with jaggery and coconut.
