= Khola chilli =

Chilli variety grown in Goa, India

Khola Chilli
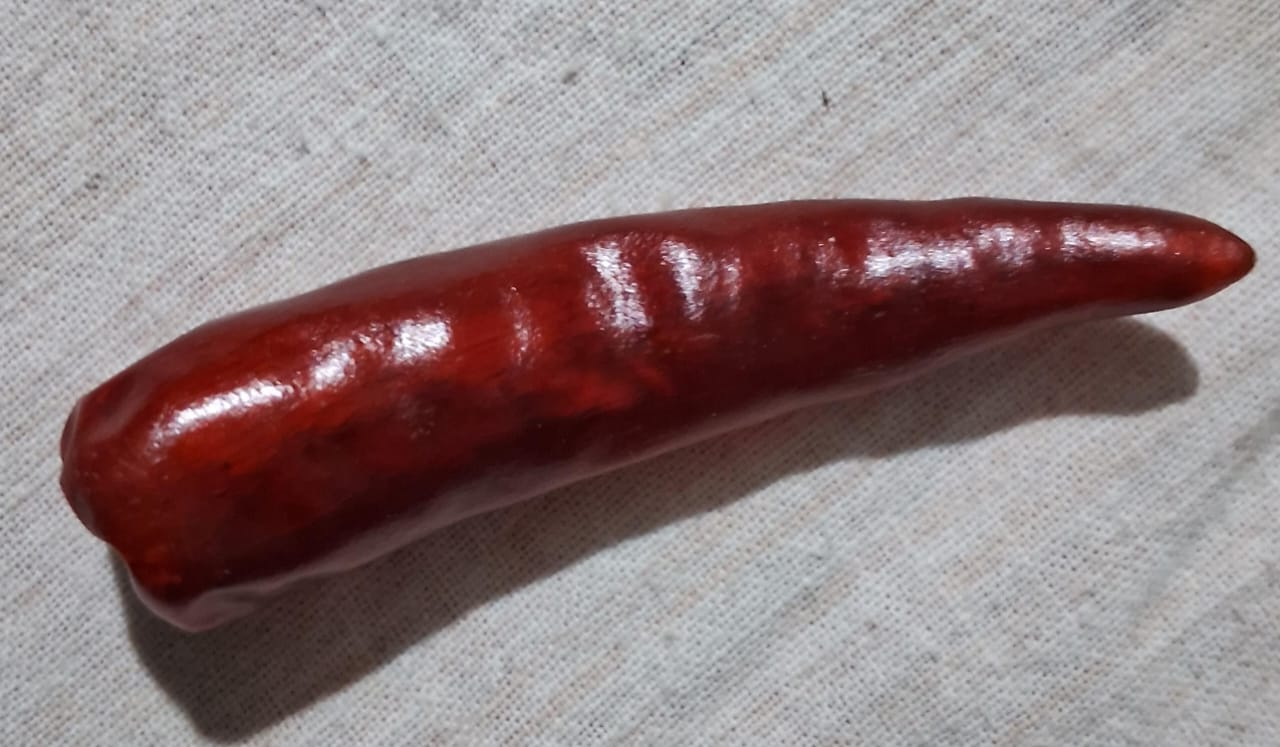
- Khola chilli - in red ripened stage
- Species: Capsicum annuum
- Origin: Goa, India
- Scoville scale: 17,100 SHU

The Khola chilli is a variety of chilli mainly grown in the Indian state of Goa.

== Name ==
It is named after its place of origin, the village of Khola, located in Canacona, South Goa district of Goa.

=== Local name ===
It is known as Khola mirsang - Mirsang in the state language of Konkani means chilli.

== Description ==
Grown exclusively on the hilly slopes of Khola village, the Khola Chilli is distinguished by its vibrant, brilliant red coloration and elongated long shape. Notably, it possesses a moderate level of pungency, alluring aroma contributing to its distinctive flavor profile. Notably, it is employed in various Indian culinary applications, such as mango pickles, chutneys, and fish curries, contributing a characteristic pungency that enhances the flavor profile of these preparations.

Khola Chilli has been officially declared as a Farmer Plant Variety by The Protection of Plant Varieties and Farmers' Rights Authority (PPV&FRA), Govt. of India making it the first Farmer Plant Variety from Goa registered with the Plant Varieties Registry of PPV&FRA.

== Photo gallery ==
Photos from the farm of Suvidha Zaraunkar (Khola chilli grower) from Soliem, Khola.

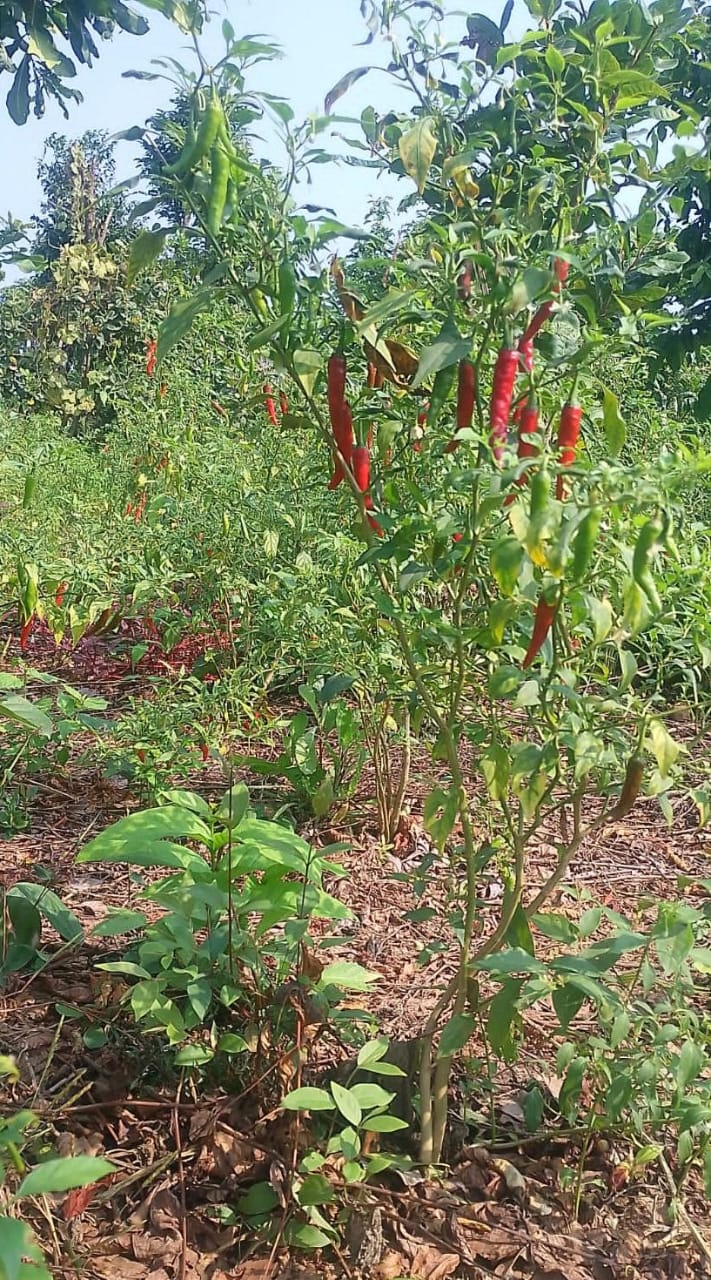
Khola chilli plant at an agricultural farm

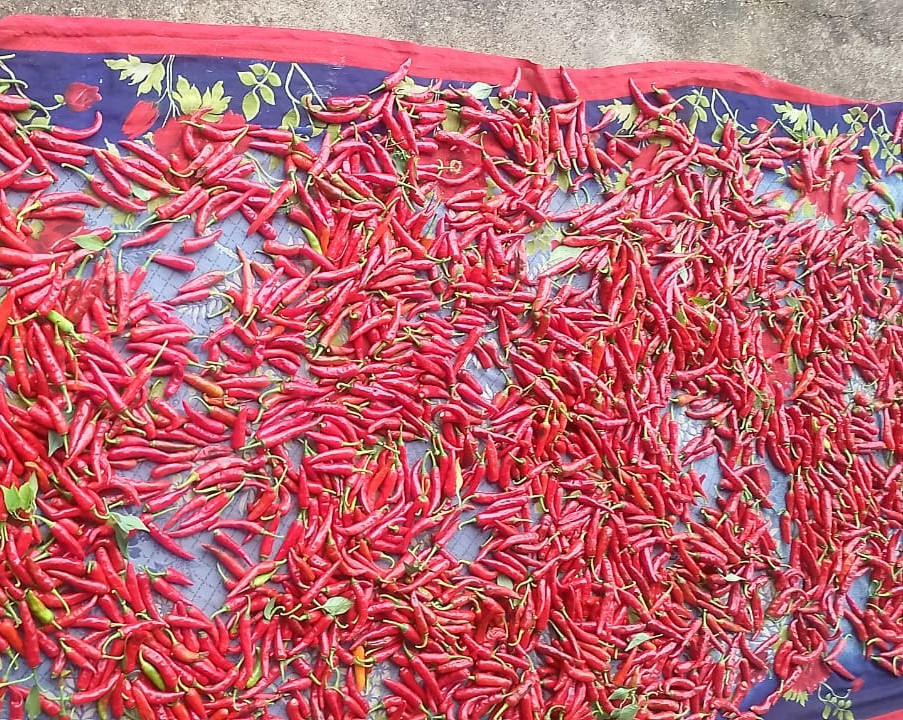
Khola chillies - in red ripened stage spread on a sheet of cloth

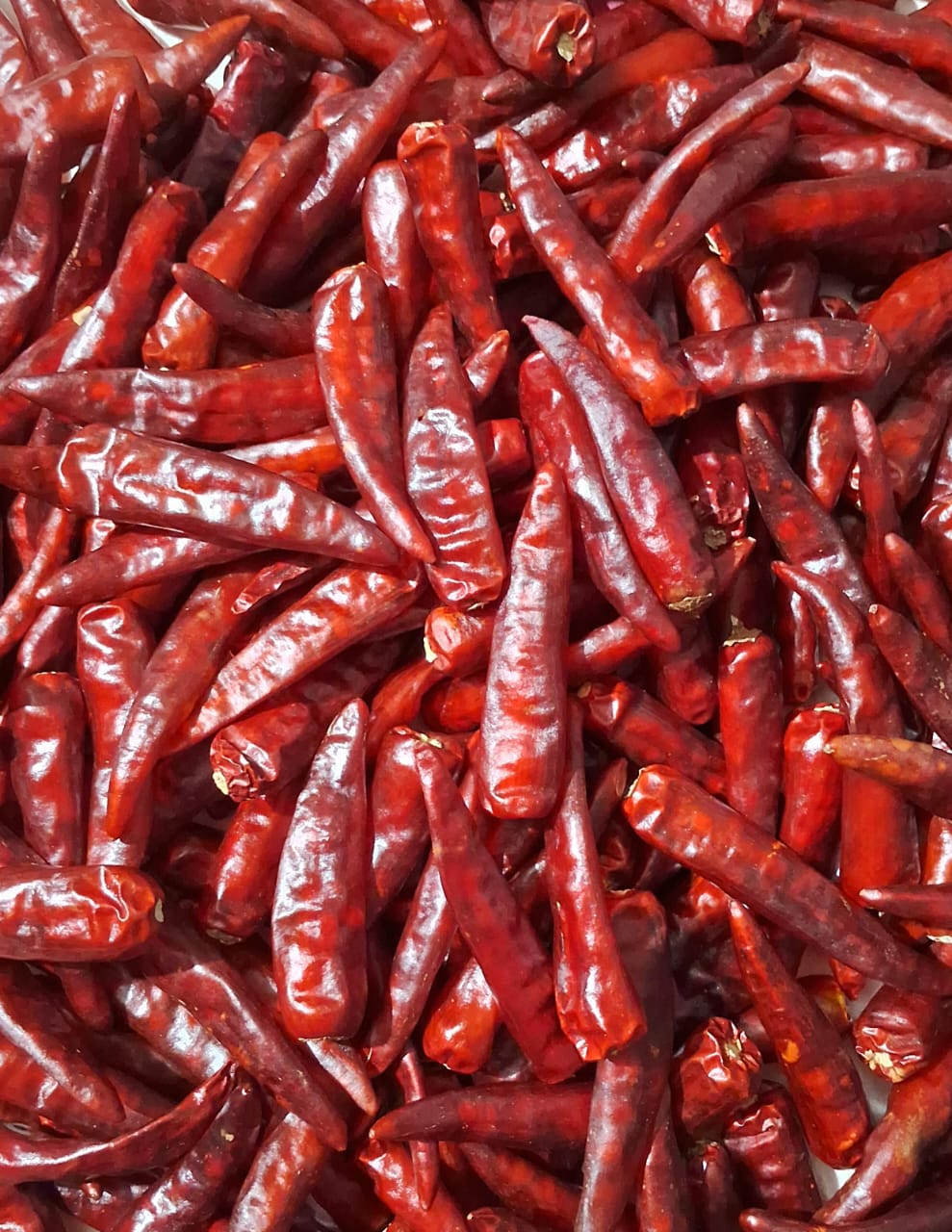
Closeup of Khola chillies

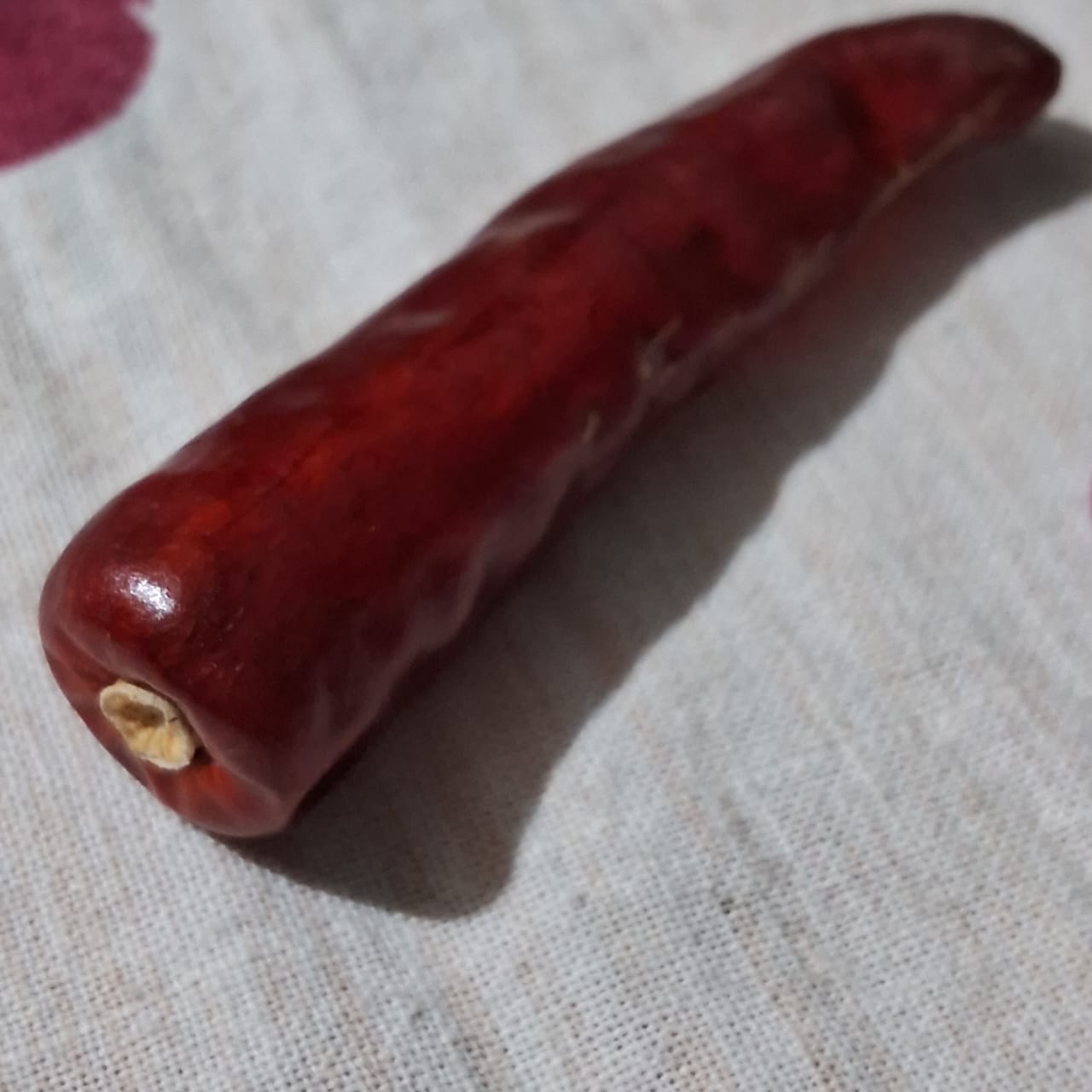
Another Closeup of a single red Khola chilli

== Geographical indication ==
It was awarded the Geographical Indication (GI) status tag from the Geographical Indications Registry under the Union Government of India on 28 August 2019 (valid until 5 August 2028).

The Khola/Canacona Chilli Cultivator's Group Association (TKCCGA) from Canacona, proposed the GI registration of Khola Chilli. After filing the application in April 2019, the chilli was granted the GI tag in 2019 by the Geographical Indication Registry in Chennai, making the name "Khola Chilli" exclusive to the chilies grown in the region. It thus became the first chilli variety from Goa and the 2nd type of goods from Goa to earn the GI tag.

== See also ==
- Goa Mankurad Mango
- Harmal Chilli
- Goa Cashew (Kaju or Caju)
- Mizo chilli
