= Cabo de Rama Fort =

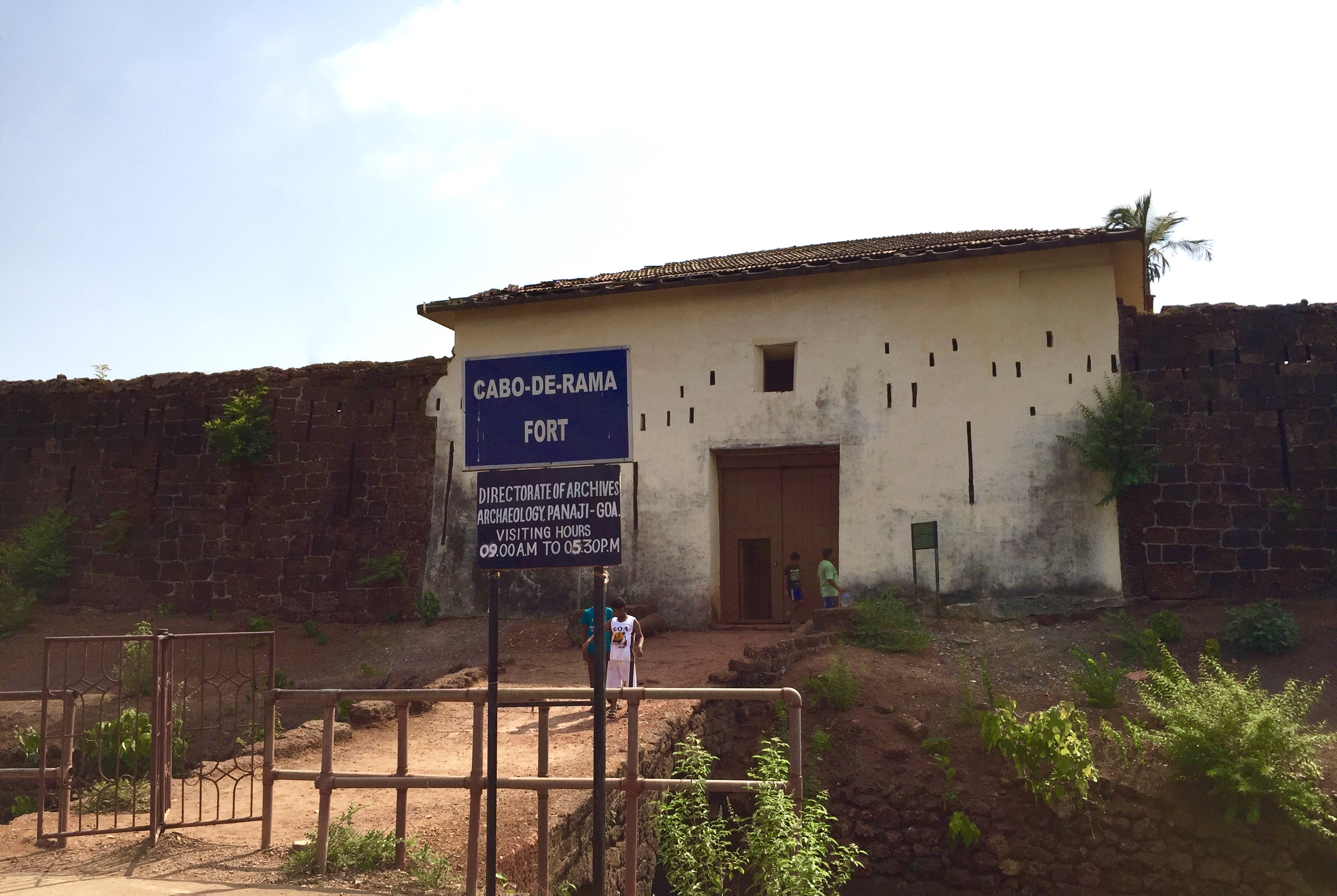
- Entrance of the Cabo de Rama Fort

- Location in Goa, India
- 15.08806°N 73.91991°E
- Location: Canacona, Goa, India

Praça do Cabo de Rama, also known as Cabo de Rama Fort, is a medieval hillfort located in Khola village, on the coast of Canacona, Goa in India.

== History ==
In the 1760s, the Portuguese gained control of Cabo de Rama after the Raja of Soonda surrendered his territory to them in return for protection against Hyder Ali of Mysore. Prior to that, the fort had regularly switched hands between Hindu and Muslim monarchs. The present structure with its walls, moats, ramparts turrets, chapel and cannons are remnants of the Portuguese era. The Portuguese equipped it with 21 guns and installed military barracks, a commander's quarter and a chapel.

In 1799, the Fourth Anglo-Mysore War saw the defeat of the King of Mysore, thus bringing an end to the Portuguese's primary rival in the region. Over time, the purpose of the fort shifted from being a defensive structure, to a prison. This fort housed a government prison till 1955.

Inside Cabo de Rama is the Capela de Santo António, a chapel which is still in use.

Cliffs drop steeply to the sea at the western side of the fort, which overlooks the entire length of Colva beach and the Canacona stretch.

== Gallery ==
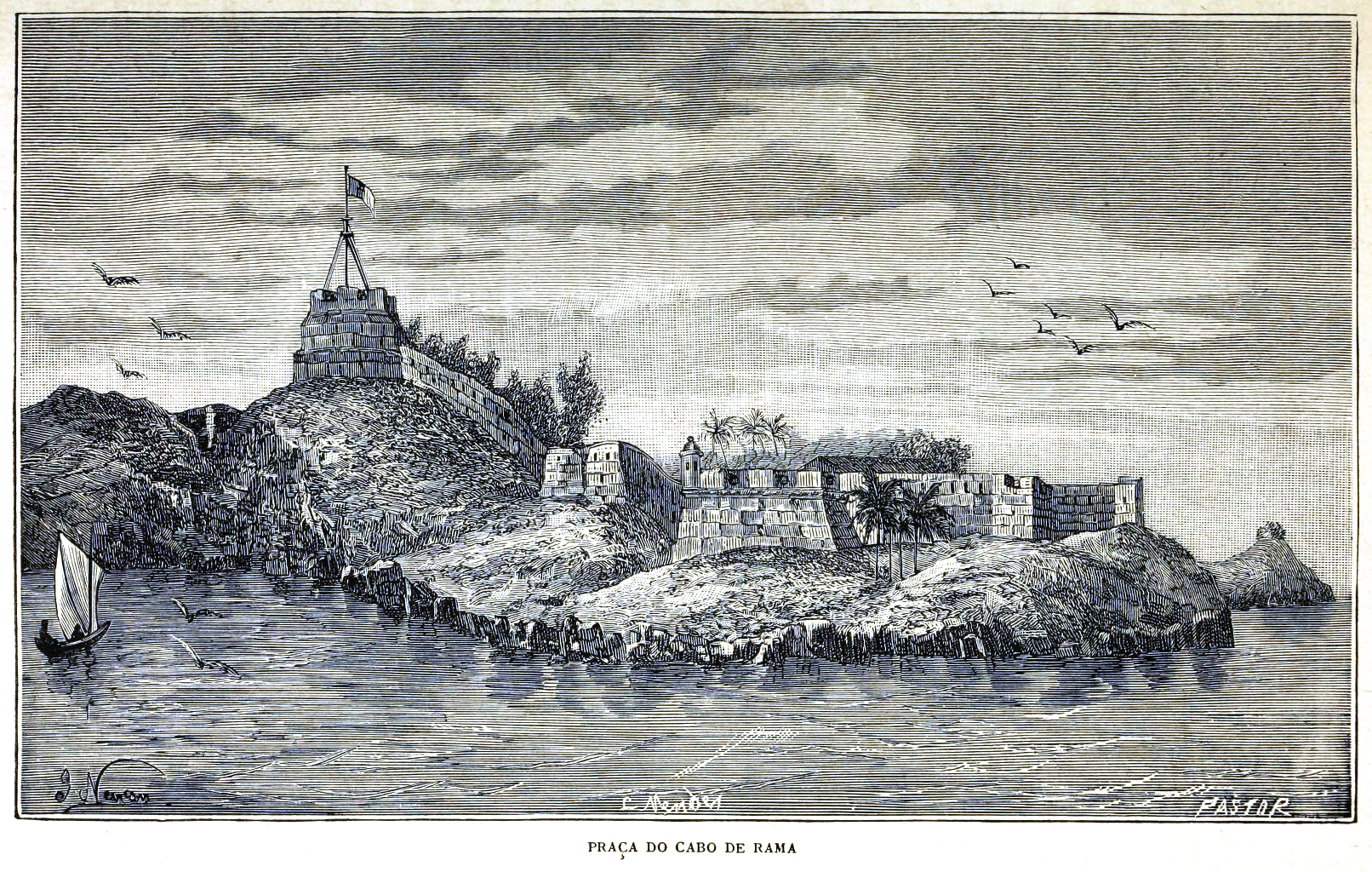
A view from 1886

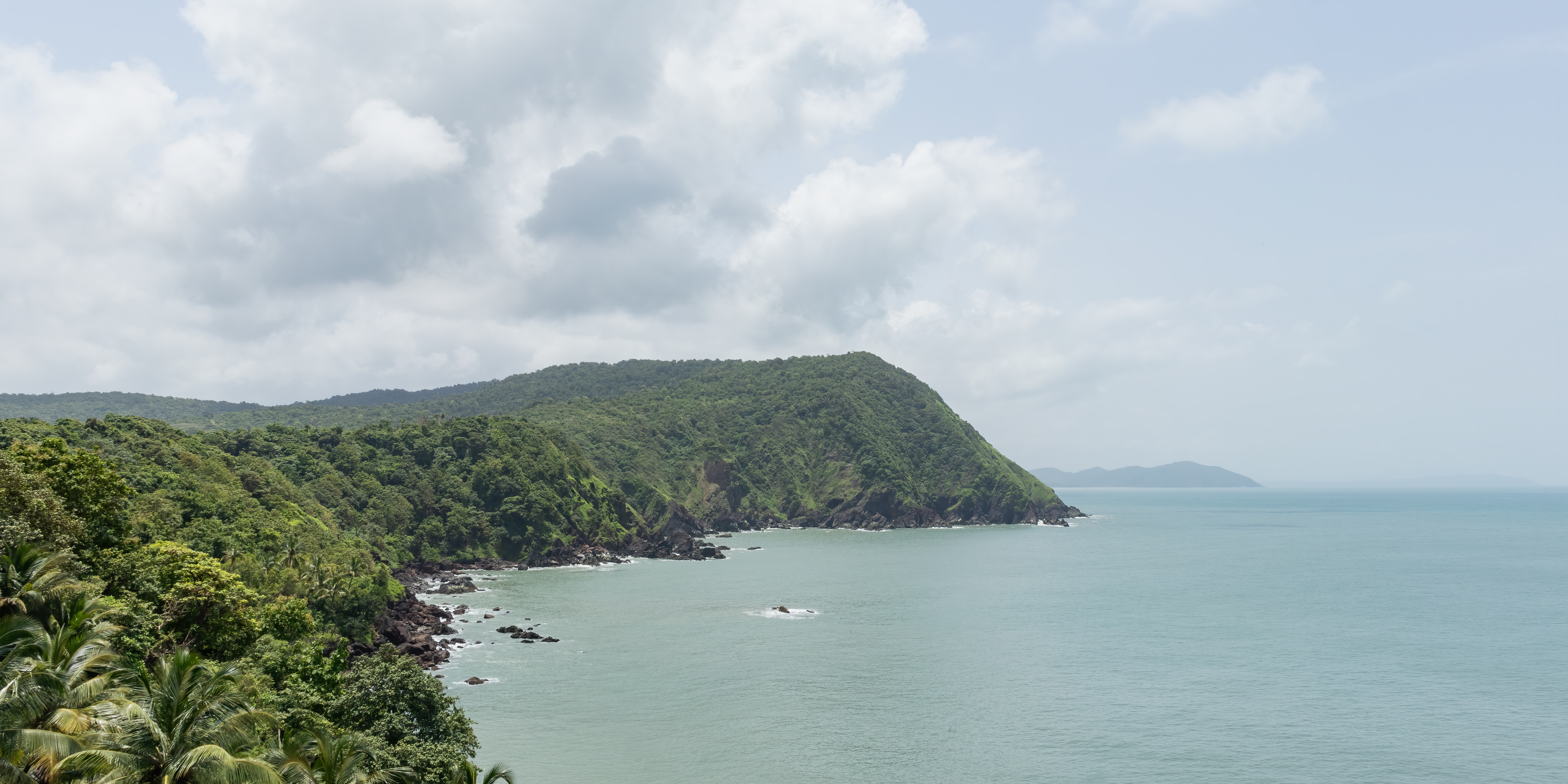
View from Cabo de Rama fort

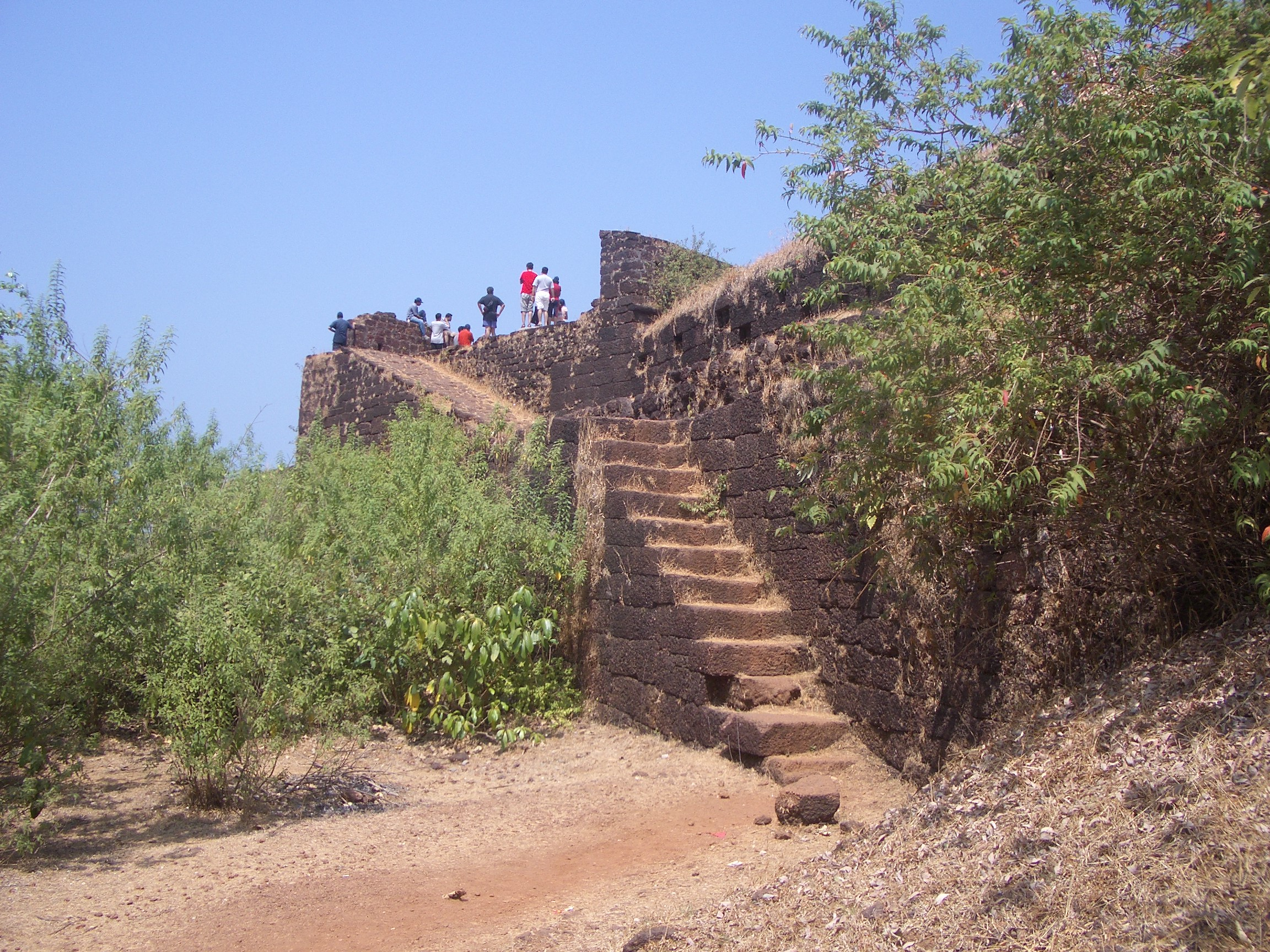
Ramparts

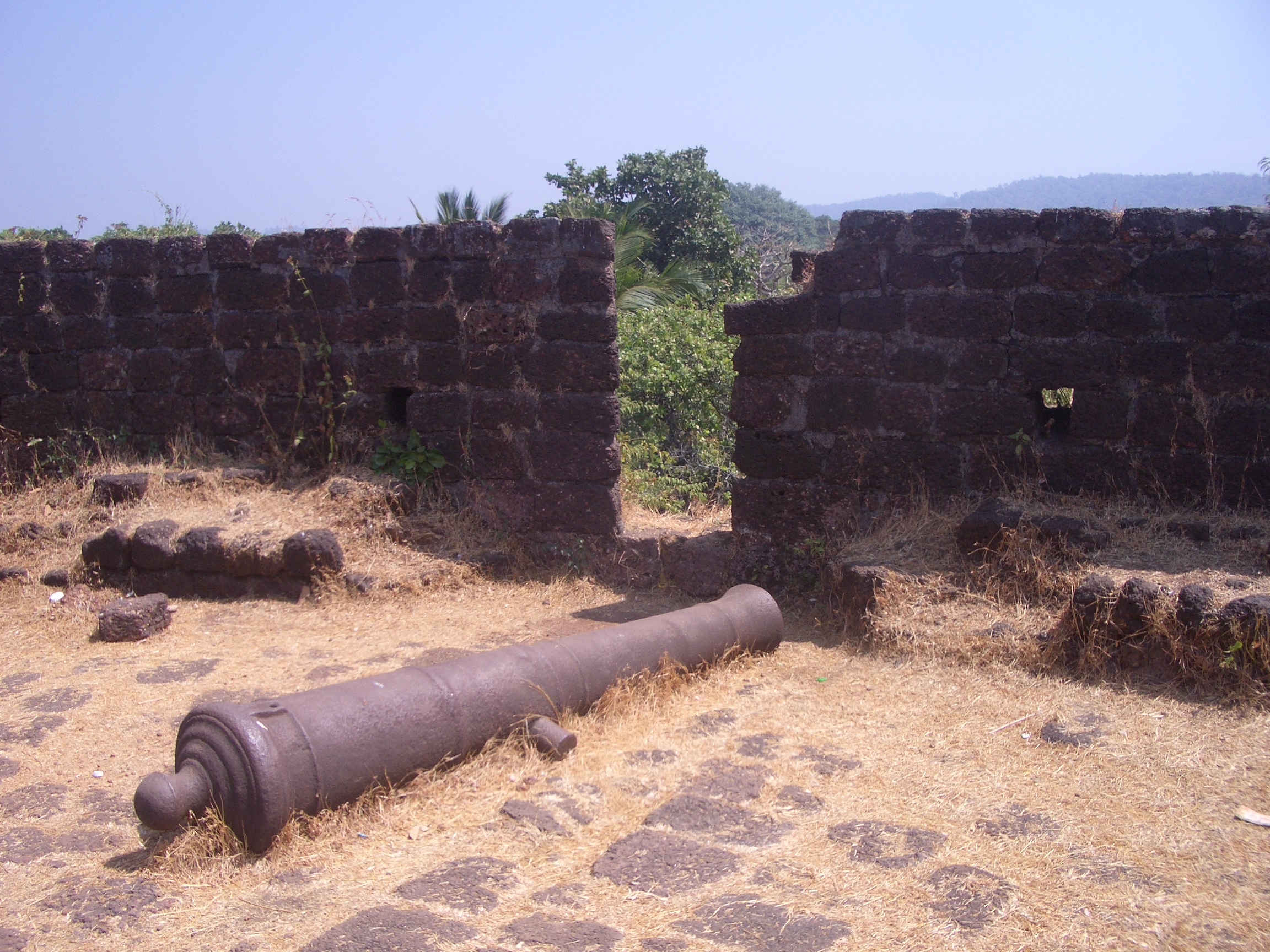
Artillery remains.

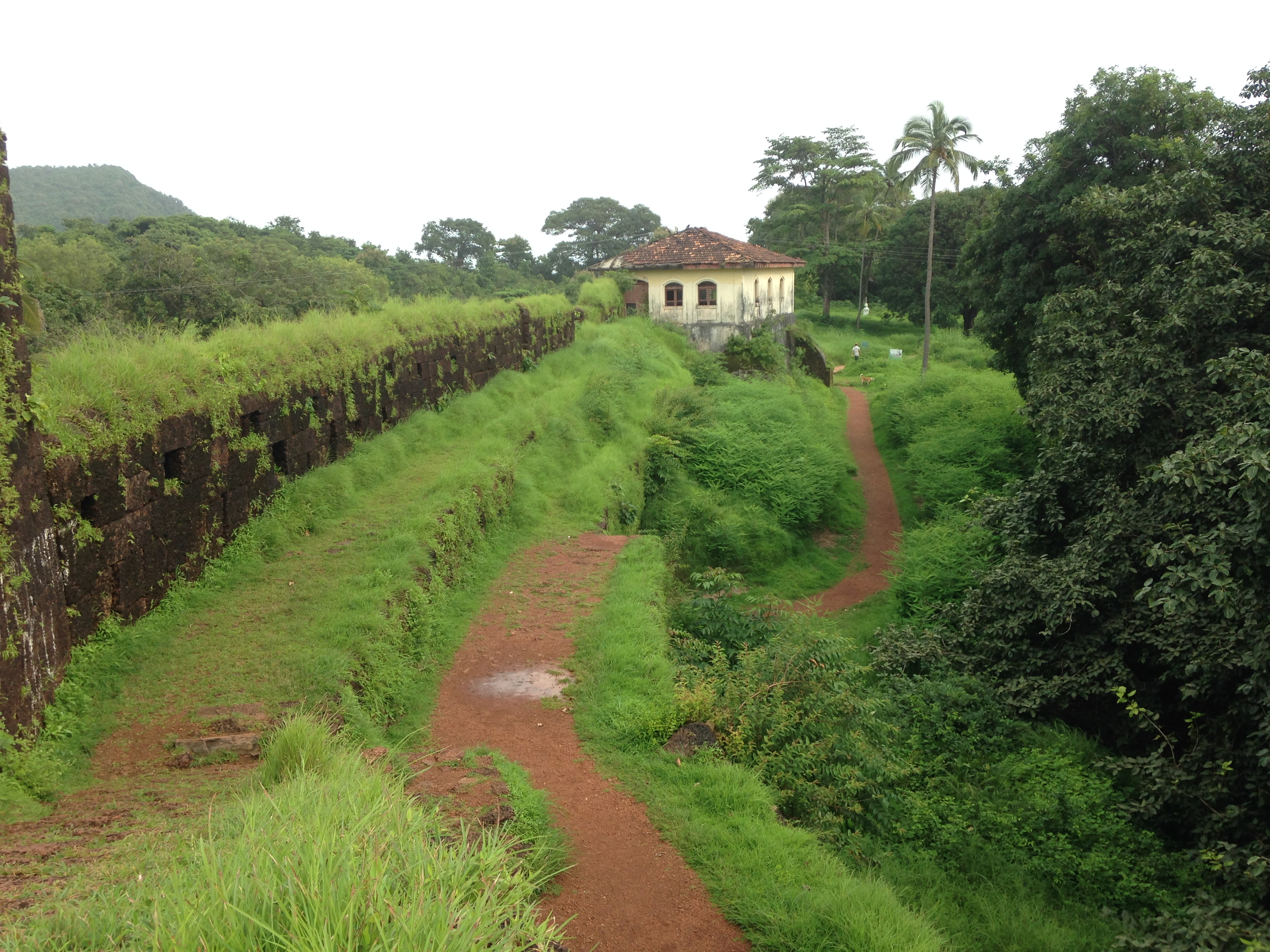
Walls.
