= Masala omelette =

Egg-based dish

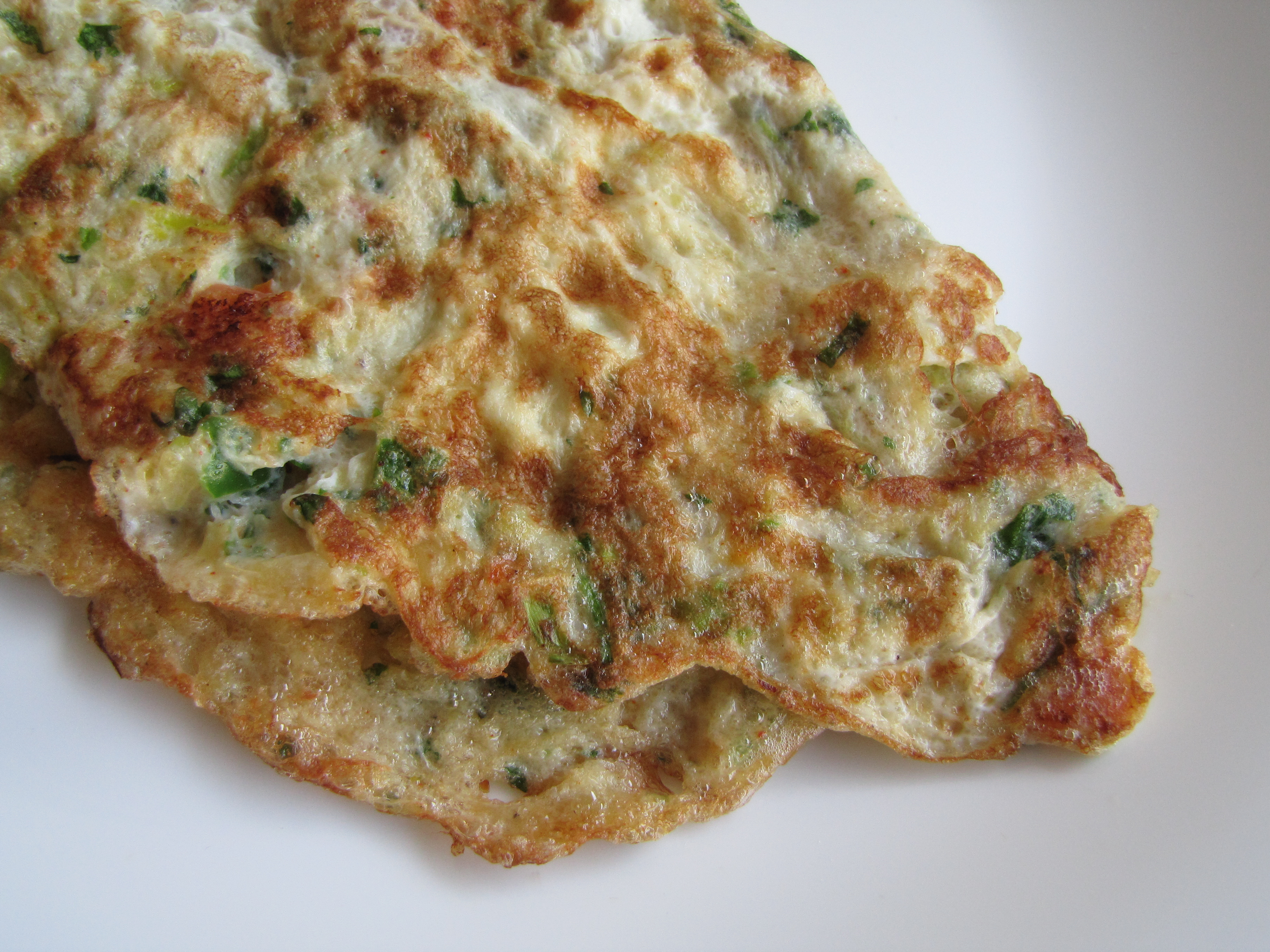
- Masala omelette
- Place of origin: India
- Associated cuisine: Indian
- Main ingredients: Egg, onions, green chillies, tomatoes

A masala omelette is a variant of the omelette originating from India. Its main ingredients are eggs, herbs, tomatoes and spices that vary by region.

Grated cheese is sometimes put over the omelette, which may also be filled with things such as shrimp and/or chicken-flavoured with curry.

The omelette commonly includes finely chopped green chili peppers and onions (or shallots), finely chopped fresh green coriander, salt, and jeera (cumin). Variations include grated coconut, ground black pepper, curry leaves, and finely chopped tomatoes. Grated cheese may also be added. The egg mixture is whisked until fluffy and then cooked on a skillet. Usually the skillet is not warmed much before the mixture is poured in and it does not immediately solidify. The stove is usually turned on right before the egg is poured in.

George Frederick Scotson-Clark, the author of Eating Without Fears, described it as "an excellent late supper dish."

== See also ==
- Tomato omelette (Chickpea flour-based, not egg-based)
