= Khatkhate =

Surname

== Khatkhate surname ==
Khatkhate (खटखटें) is a well-known last name in Saraswat Brahmin (GSB) community hailing from Konkan province of Maharashtra state and the coastal region of Goa in India.

== Khatkhate curry ==
Khatkhate (खतखतें) is a mixed vegetable stew prepared in Goan Hindu cuisine. It is commonly prepared for Goan Hindu weddings, religious ceremonies, and festive occasions like Ganesh Chaturthi.

Khatkhate is prepared with at least five vegetables, plus grated coconut, jaggery, kokum, tamarind, tirphala/tepphal (Sichuan pepper, dried red chili, garam masala powder, and turmeric powder. The vegetables include radish (mooli), potato, sweet potato (ratala), carrots, corn on the cob, pumpkins (bhopala), and any seasonal vegetables.

== Khatkhate ladu ==
Khatkhate ladu (खतखतें लाडू) is a traditional sweet delicacy from Malvan, Maharashtra. The laddus are prepared by binding sugar-coated crispy sev strands, locally known as khaja, into a ball. A distinctive feature of khatkhate ladu is their dry, hard, and crisp exterior, which contrasts with a moist and soft core that is often infused with sugar syrup. Despite the shared name, khatkhate ladu is a separate preparation and is not consumed with the khatkhate vegetable stew.
