= Xacuti =

Curry dish from Goa, India

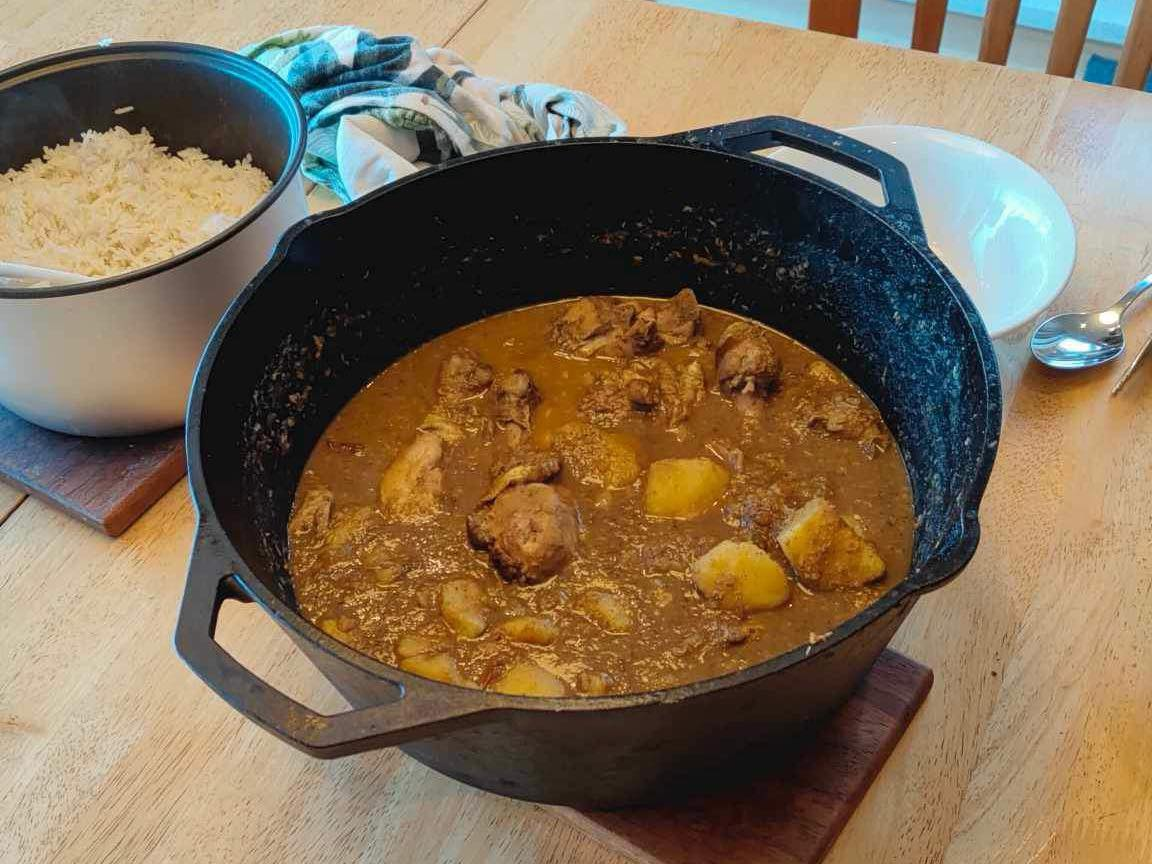
- Chicken and potato xacuti
- Type: Curry
- Place of origin: India
- Region or state: Goa former Estado da Índia Portuguesa
- Main ingredients: Crabs, chicken, lamb or beef; white poppy seeds; roasted shredded coconut; dried red chillies

Xacuti (Konkani: शागोती Shāgōtī) is a curry prepared in Goa, India, with complex spicing, including white poppy seeds, sliced onions, toasted grated coconut, and large dried red chillies. It is usually prepared with crabs, chicken, lamb, or beef. It is also known as chacuti in Portuguese.

Xacuti, or shagoti as it is commonly known in Goa, is supposed to have its origin in Harmal village (now Arambol) of Pernem taluka, Goa. Historically, local fishermen would prepare a sauce or gravy containing spices such as black peppercorns, chillies, turmeric, onions, nutmeg, cinnamon, and cloves. Added to this would be lightly toasted coconut and white poppy seeds. This sauce would then be served with freshly caught fish or chicken.
