= Couch surfing (disambiguation) =

Couch surfing (sofa surfing) is the practice of temporarily staying in another person's home

Couch surfing, couchsurfer, couch-surf, or variation, can also refer to:

- CouchSurfing, a website designed to help arrange couch surfing
- Couch Surfin USA, a 2015 EP by the band YJY
- "Couch Surfer", a 1998 song by Bran Van 3000 off the album Glee (Bran Van 3000 album)
- "Couch Surfer", a 2011 song by Ducktails off the album Killin the Vibe
- The Couchsurfer, a VR nominated at the 2018 11th Transgender Erotica Awards
- Couch Surfer, Lover (EP), a 2019 extended play by Emily Blue and Tara Terra, see Emily Blue discography

== See also ==
- Sofa surfing (disambiguation)
- Couch (disambiguation)
- Surfing (disambiguation)
- Surfer (disambiguation)
- Surf (disambiguation)
- Sofa (disambiguation)
