= Cooch =

Cooch can refer to:

- A colloquial term for the vagina
- A variation of the surname Couch
  - William Cooch (1898–1950), New Zealand artist, architect and stamp designer

== See also ==
- Cooch Behar (disambiguation)
- Hoochie coochie, a dance
- Couch (disambiguation)
