= Couch (disambiguation) =

A couch is a piece of furniture.

Couch or couches may also refer to:

== Biology ==
- Elymus repens, also known as Couch grass
- Cynodon dactylon, also known as Bermuda grass
- Various species of Digitaria

== Media ==
- Couch (film), a 1964 film by Andy Warhol
- Couch (German band), a German post-rock band
- Couch (American band), a soul-, funk-, and jazz-pop band
- "Couch", a song by Eves Karydas from the 2018 album Summerskin

== Places ==
- Couch, West Virginia, a community in the United States
- Couches, Saône-et-Loire, a commune in the Saône-et-Loire department of France

== Other uses ==
- Couch (company), an electrical company in Massachusetts, United States
- Couch (surname)
- CouchDB, a distributed document-centric datastore written in Erlang
- Community of Urbana Champaign Cooperative Housing, an American association of housing cooperatives

== See also ==
- Couch surfing (disambiguation)
- Coach (disambiguation)
- The Couch (disambiguation)
- Sofa (disambiguation)
- Settee (disambiguation)
