= Surf =

Surf or SURF may also refer to:

== Commercial products ==
- Surf (detergent), a brand of laundry detergent made by Unilever

== Computers and software ==
- surf (web browser), a lightweight web browser for Unix-like systems
- Surf (video game), a 2020 video game included with Microsoft Edge
- SURF, an acronym for "Speeded up robust features", a computer vision algorithm

== Education ==
- Summer Undergraduate Research Fellowship, a common summer immersion experience in higher education which supplement research activities that occur during the academic year

== Music ==
- Surf (Roddy Frame album), 2002
- Surf (Donnie Trumpet & The Social Experiment album), 2015
- Surf music, a genre of popular music associated with surf culture
- "Surf", a song by Mac Miller from Circles
- "Surf", a song by Young Thug from So Much Fun

== Places ==
- Surf, California, unincorporated community in Santa Barbara County near Lompoc
- Surf station, passenger rail station served by Amtrak's Pacific Surfliner
- Sanford Underground Research Facility, national laboratory for experiments conducted deep underground, in South Dakota

== Popular culture ==
- Surf culture, the culture surrounding the sport of surfing

== Ships ==
- USS Surf, the name of more than one United States Navy ship

== Sports ==
- Surfing, a surface water sport
- Atlantic City Surf, a defunct professional baseball team that played in Atlantic City, New Jersey, in the United States from 1998 to 2008

== Other uses ==
- Surf zone, the foreshore region where approaching ocean surface waves get taller and break to form foamy/bubbly surface known as surf
- SURF (Stanford US-Russia Forum)
- Scottish Urban Regeneration Forum, an urban renewal body
- Sanford Underground Research Facility, the underground laboratory
- SURFnet, the university computing organisation in the Netherlands

== See also ==
- Surfing (disambiguation)
- Serfdom
- Surf and turf
- Surf City (disambiguation)
- Surf clam (disambiguation)
