= Surfer (disambiguation) =

A surfer takes part in the sport of surfing.

Surfer may also refer to:

== Film ==
- The Surfer (1986 film), starring Gary Day
- The Surfer (2024 film), starring Nicolas Cage

== Literature ==
- Surfer (magazine), 1962–2020
- "The Surfer" (poem), 1945, by Judith Wright

== Music ==
- Surfer (EP), 2001, by NOFX
- "The Surfer", 2024, on Only God Was Above Us

== Other uses ==
- Surfer (advertisement), an ad campaign for Guinness stout
- Surfer (software), an AI SEO SaaS

== See also ==
- Surfing (disambiguation)
- Surfer Dude (disambiguation)
- Surfers Paradise (disambiguation)
- Silver Surfer (disambiguation)
- Surfer hair
