= Coke =

Coke usually refers to:

- Coke (fuel), a coal-based fuel
- Clipping of Coca-Cola, a brand of soft drink
  - The Coca-Cola Company
- Slang term for cocaine, an illicit drug

Coke may also refer to:

== Beverages ==
- Cola, similar drinks to Coca-Cola
- Generic name for a soft drink

== People ==
- Coke (surname), a list of people
- Coco or Coke, a Karankawa tribe in Texas, United States
- Coke baronets, an extinct English title of nobility (1641–1727)
- Coke Daniels, American film director, writer and producer
- Coke Escovedo (1941–1986), American percussionist
- Coke Newell, American writer
- Coke Reed (born 1940), American mathematician
- Coke R. Stevenson (1888–1975), 1940s governor of Texas
- Coke (footballer) (born 1987), Spanish footballer Jorge Andújar Moreno
- Coke La Rock (born 1955), American rapper

== Places in the United States ==
- Coke, Texas, an unincorporated community
- Coke County, Texas

== Other uses ==
- Coke (album), a 1975 album by Coke Escovedo
- COKE (programming language)
- Antonov An-24, a Soviet transport aircraft (NATO reporting name: Coke)
- Petroleum coke, a solid, carbon-rich residue from oil distillation

== See also ==
- Coke Studio (disambiguation)
- Koch (disambiguation)
- Koke (disambiguation)
