= Greg Koch (disambiguation) =

Greg Koch may refer to:

- Greg Koch (born June 14, 1955), American Football player
- Greg Koch (musician) (born June 23, 1966), American musician - guitar player
- Greg Koch Brewing company executive

== See also ==
- Koch (disambiguation)
