= Surf Beach =

Surf Beach may refer to:

- Surf Beach, California or Surf, California
- Surf Beach, New South Wales
- Surf Beach, Victoria

== See also ==
- Beach
- Beach (disambiguation)
- Surfing
- Surfing (disambiguation)
