= American English regional vocabulary =

Regional vocabulary

American English regional vocabulary
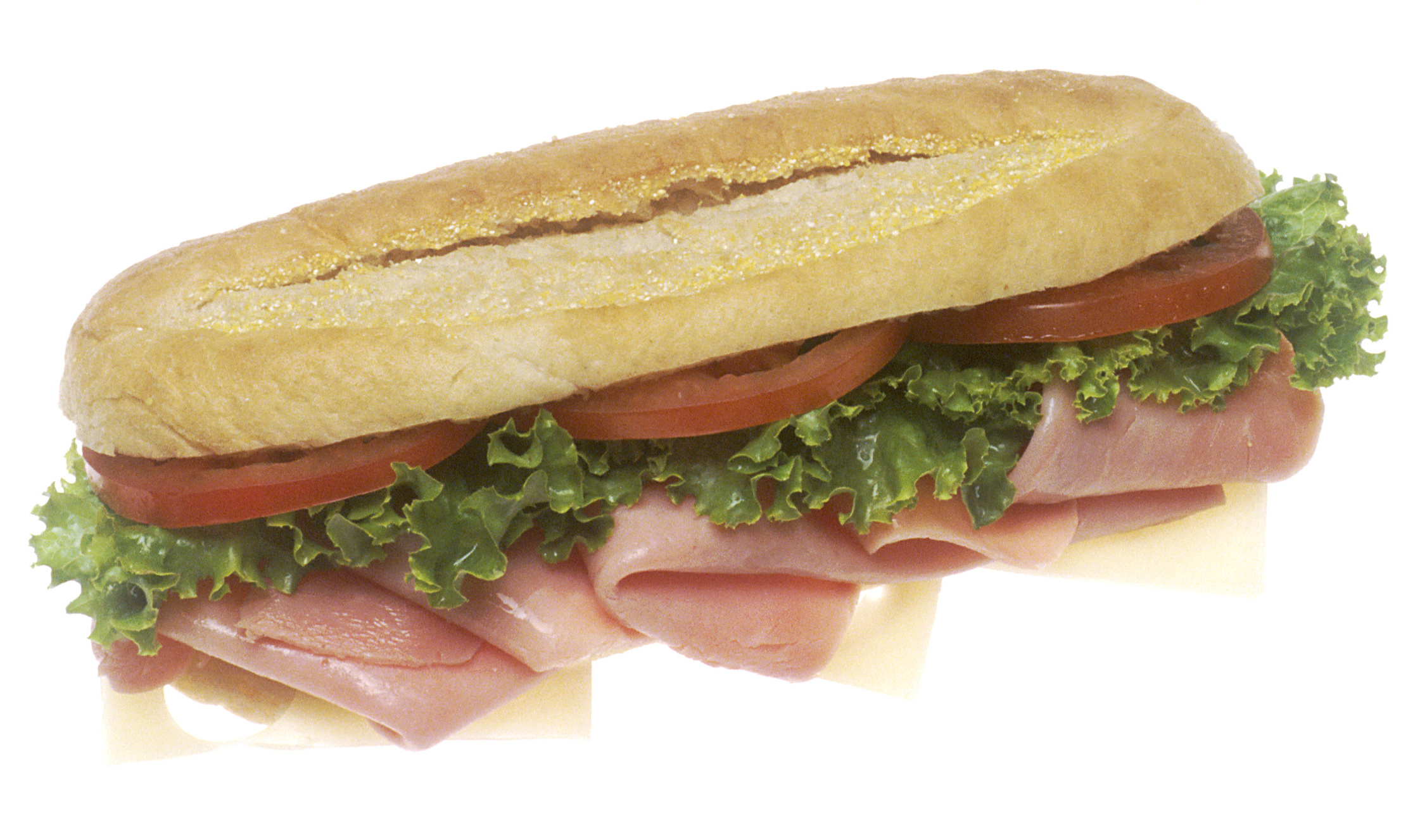
Grinder, hero, hoagie, or sub

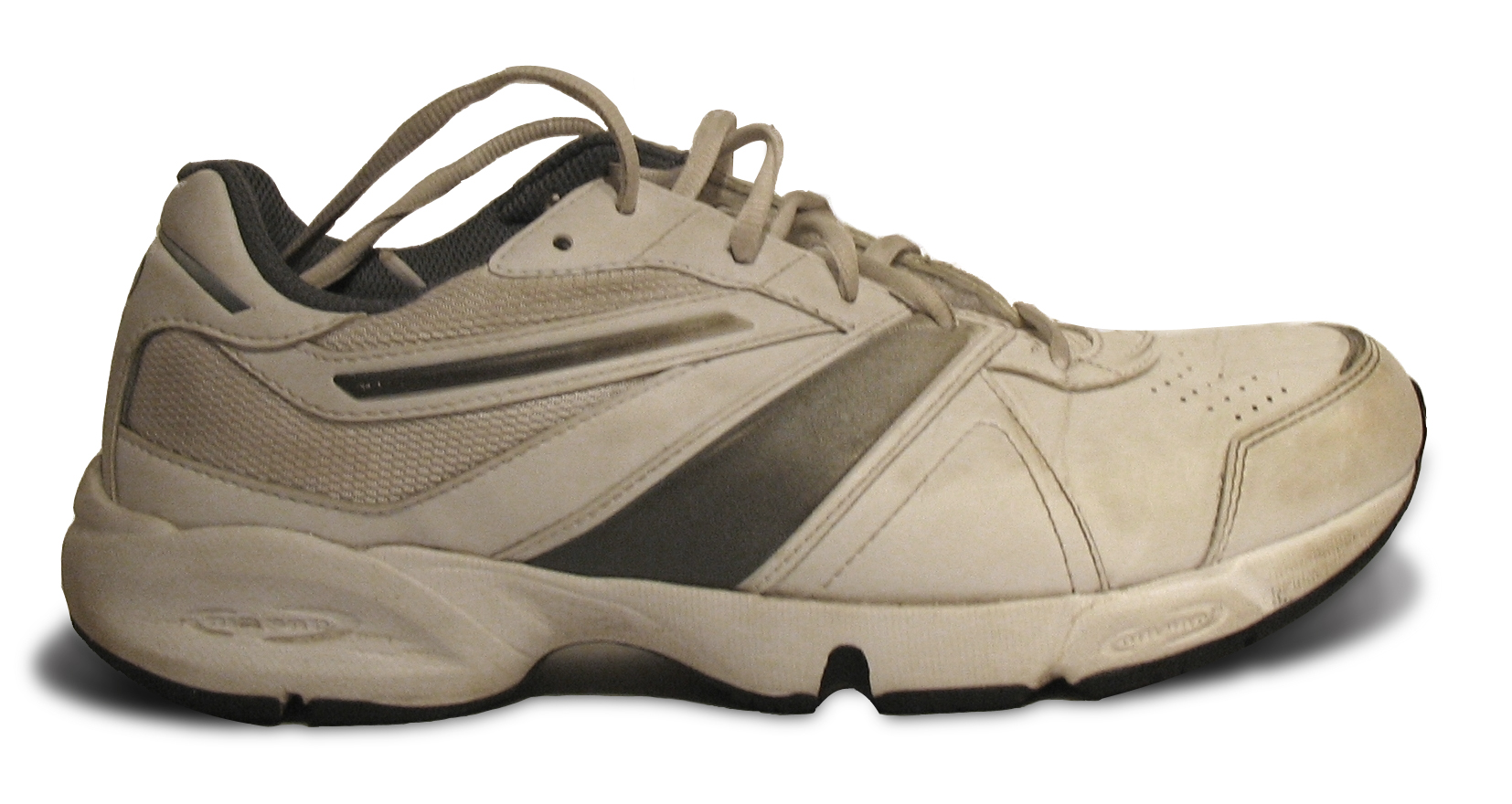
Gym shoe, sneaker, or tennis shoe

Regional vocabulary within American English varies. Below is a list of lexical differences in vocabulary that are generally associated with a region. A term featured on a list may or may not be found throughout the region concerned, and may or may not be recognized by speakers outside that region. Some terms appear on more than one list.

== Regionalisms ==
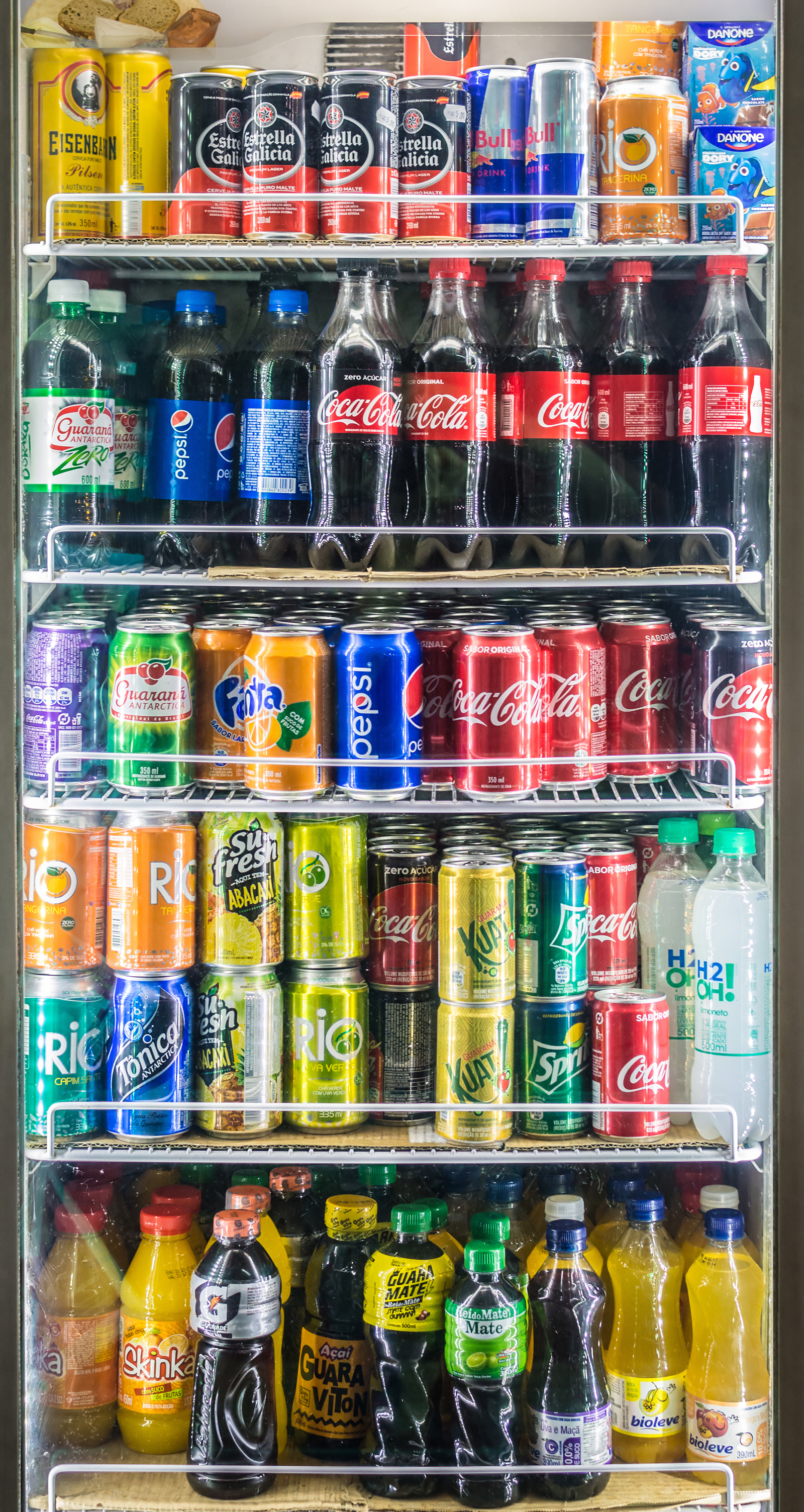
Coke, pop, soda, or tonic

Historically, a number of everyday words and expressions used to be characteristic of different dialect areas of the United States, especially the North, the Midland, and the South; many of these terms spread from their area of origin and came to be used throughout the nation. Today many people use these different words for the same object interchangeably, or to distinguish between variations of an object. Such traditional lexical variables include:^{[a]}

- faucet (North) and spigot (South)^{[c]}
- frying pan (North and South, but not Midland), spider (obsolete New England), and skillet (Midland and South)
- gutter (Northeast, South, and West), eaves trough (West and Inland North), and rainspouting (Maryland and Pennsylvania)
- pit (North) and seed (elsewhere)
- teeter-totter (North; widespread),^{[c]} seesaw (South and Midland; now widespread), and dandle (Rhode Island)
- firefly (more Northern and Western) and lightning bug (widespread)
- pail (North, north Midland) and bucket (Midland and South; now widespread)
- sneakers (Northeast and fairly widespread), tennis shoes (widespread outside the Northeast) and gym shoes (Chicago and Cincinnati)
- soda (Northeast, Greater Milwaukee, Great St. Louis, California, and Florida), pop (Inland North, Upper Midwest, and Northwest), coke (South), and tonic (Eastern New England possibility) See also: Names for soft drinks in the United States
- you guys (widespread), y'all (Southern and South Midland), you'uns and yins (Western Pennsylvania), and yous or youse (New York City, Philadelphia, New Jersey, and Northeastern Pennsylvania)

However many differences still hold and mark boundaries between different dialect areas, as shown below. From 2000 to 2005, for instance, The Dialect Survey queried North American English speakers' usage of a variety of linguistic items, including vocabulary items that vary by region. These include:

- generic term for a sweetened carbonated beverage
- drink made with milk and ice cream
- long sandwich that contains cold cuts, lettuce, and so on
- rubber-soled shoes worn in physical education class, for athletic activities, etc.

Below are lists outlining regional vocabularies in the main dialect areas of the United States.

== North ==
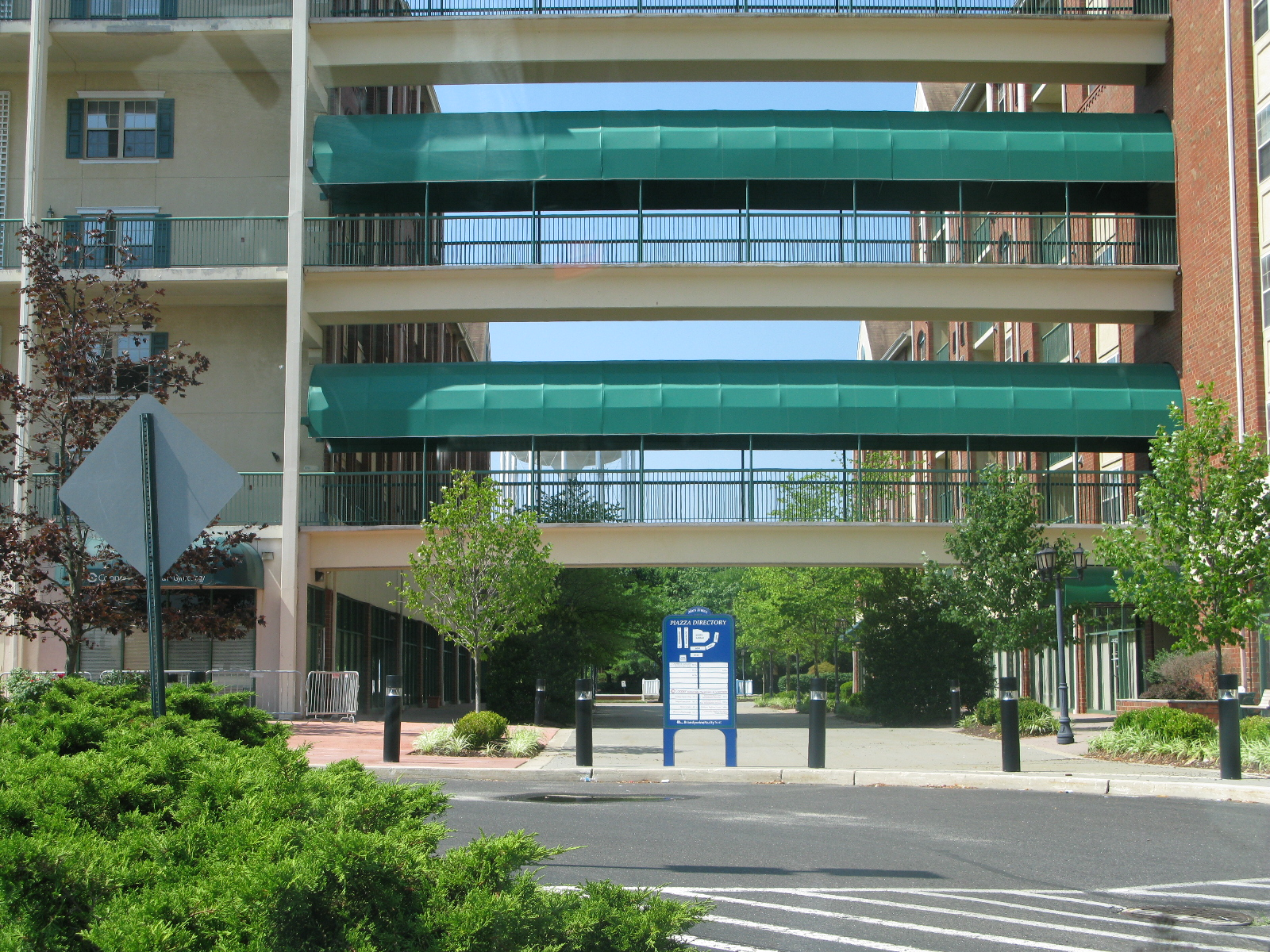
Breezeways connecting two buildings

- brat or braht – bratwurst^{[b]}
- breezeway (widespread) ("skyway" in Minnesota) – a hallway connecting two buildings^{[b]}
- clout (originally Chicago, now widespread) – political or social influence^{[b]}
- davenport (widespread though uncommon) – a sofa, or couch^{[b]}
- euchre (throughout the North) – card game similar to spades^{[b]}
- fridge (throughout North and West) – refrigerator^{[b]}
- hotdish (esp. Minnesota) – a simple entree cooked in a single dish, related to casserole
- paczki (in Polish settlement areas, esp. Illinois, Michigan, Ohio and Wisconsin) – a jelly doughnut^{[b]}
- pop (North-Central and West) – a soft drink, carbonated soda^{[b]}
- soda (all the Northeast and parts of Wisconsin) – soft drink^{[d]}
- Troll (North-Central) – people who reside in the Lower Peninsula of Michigan
- Yooper (North-Central) – people who reside in the Upper Peninsula of Michigan
- ope – a form of alert or apology used when trying to get around someone or something; E.g. "Ope, let me squeeze right past ya". Ope is most often used in Wisconsin, Michigan, Illinois, and Minnesota.

=== Northeast ===
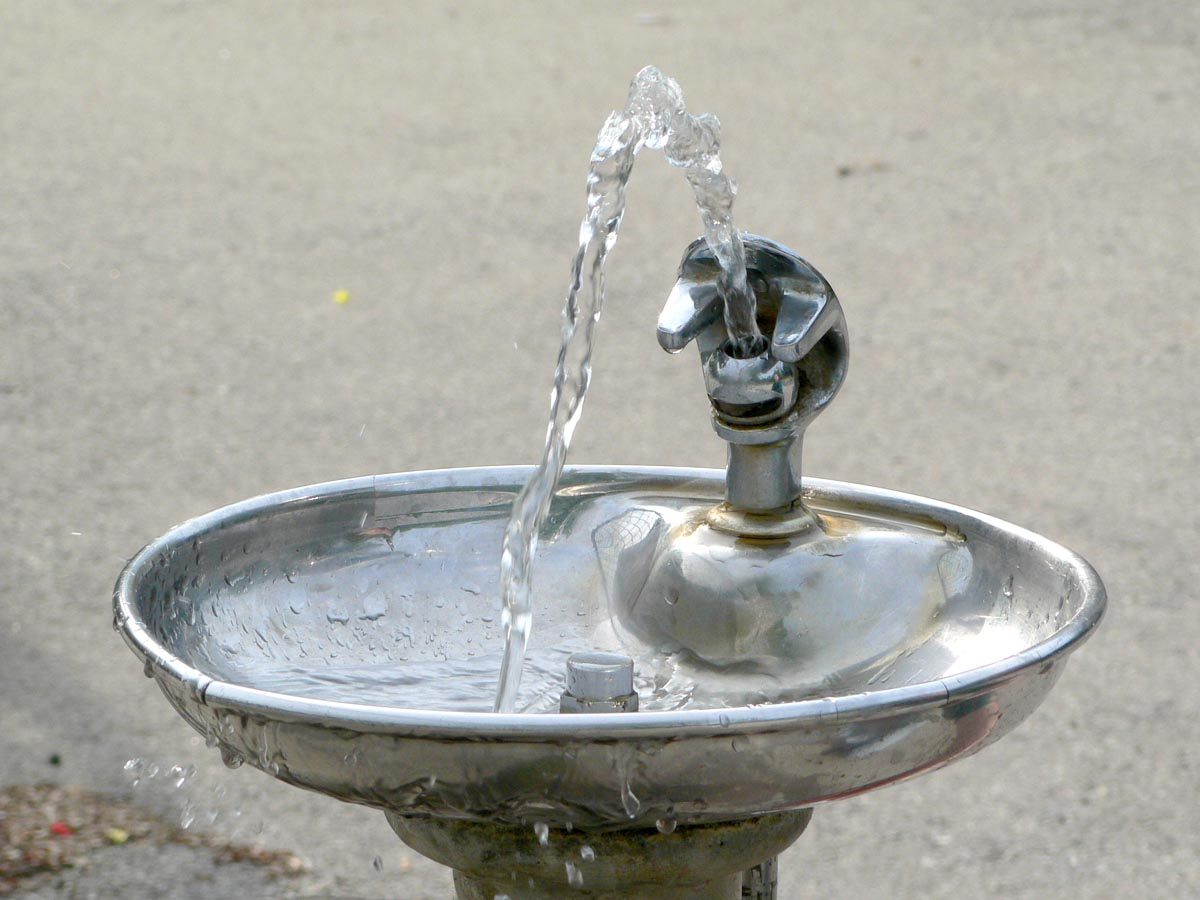
Bubbler, drinking fountain, or water fountain

- brook (now widespread but especially common in the Northeast) – creek ^{[b]}
- bubbler (esp. New England, Wisconsin and the Mississippi and Ohio river valleys) – a water fountain^{[b]}
- cellar – alternate term for basement
- sneakers (throughout the U.S., though concentrated in the Northeast and parts of Florida) – generic rubber-soled athletic shoe.
- soda – a sweet, carbonated soft drink^{[d]}
- Mischief Night (or, rarer, Cabbage Night) – an annual night when, by custom, preteens and teenagers play pranks; usually, the night before Halloween^{[b]}

==== New England ====
Rotary, roundabout, or traffic circle

- grinder – submarine sandwich^{[b]}
- packie (package store) – a liquor store^{[b]}
- rotary – traffic circle^{[b]}
- tag sale – garage sale^{[b]}
- wicked (all of Massachusetts) – very; an intensifier and adverb, as in wicked cold meaning very cold^{[c]}

===== Eastern New England =====
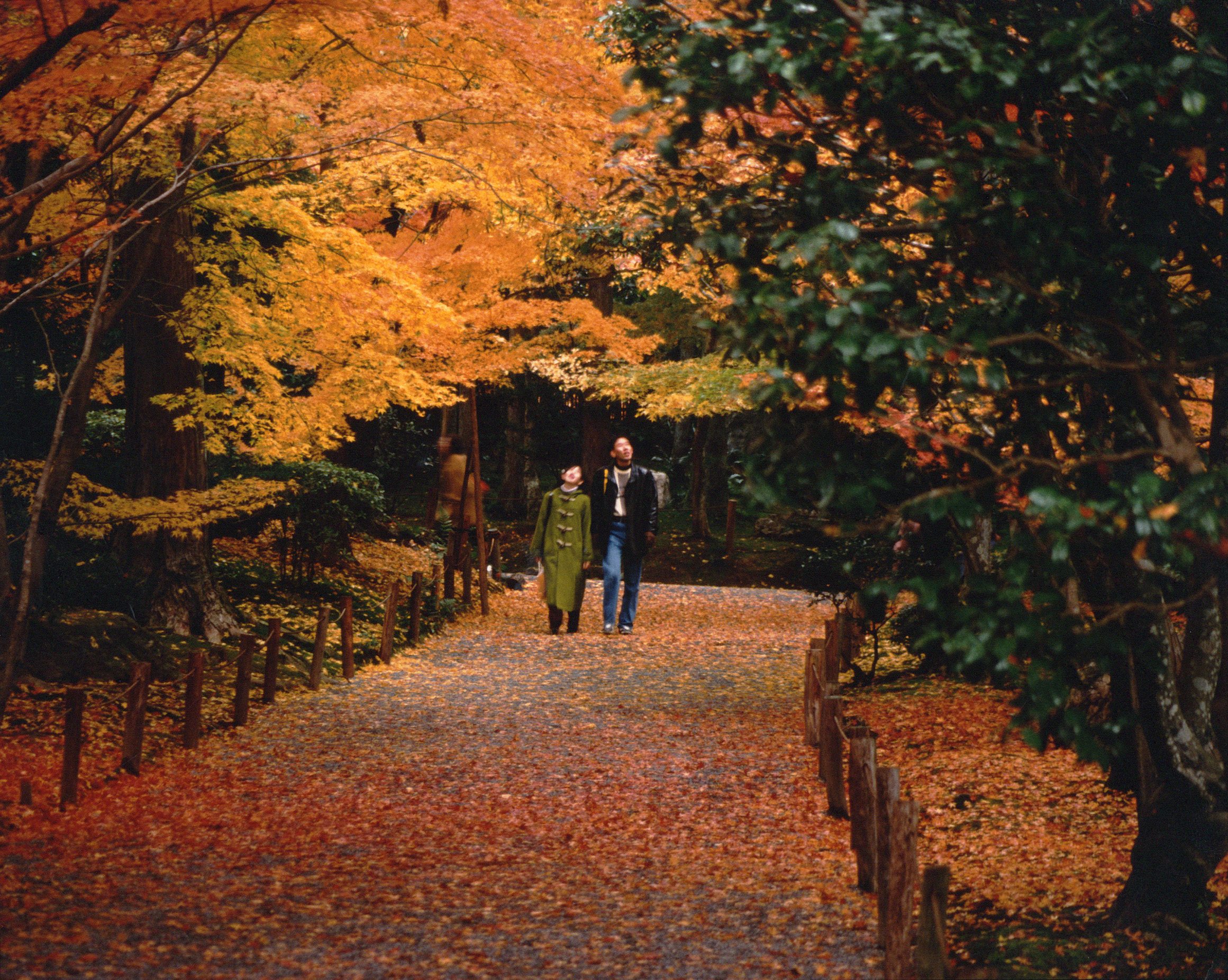
Leaf peeping

- bulkhead – cellar hatchway^{[b]}
- cabinet (Rhode Island) – milk shake^{[b]}
- frappe – milkshake^{[b]}
- hosey – (rare, but esp. parts of Massachusetts & Maine) to stake a claim or choose sides, to claim ownership of something (sometimes, the front seat of a car)^{[b]}
- intervale – bottomland; mostly historical^{[b]}
- jimmies – sprinkles (ice cream topping)^{[b]} see also Mid-Atlantic, below
- johnnycake (also Rhode Island jonnycake) – a type of cornmeal bread^{[b]}
- leaf peeper – a tourist who has come to see the area's vibrant autumn foliage^{[b]}
- necessary – outhouse, privy^{[b]}
- quahog – pronounced "koe-hog," it properly refers to a specific species of clam but is also applied to any clam^{[b]}
- tonic (eastern Massachusetts) – soft drink^{[b]}

===== Northern New England =====
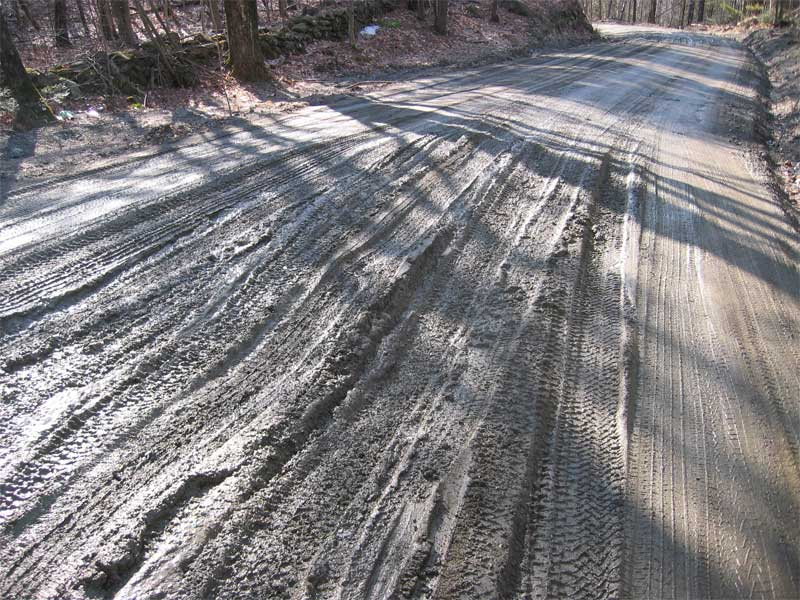
Muddy dirt road during Mud Season

- ayuh – "yes" or affirmative^{[b]}
- creemee – (Vermont) soft serve ice cream
- dooryard – area around the main entry door of a house, specifically a farmhouse. Typically including the driveway and parking area proximal to the house^{[b]}
- Italian (sandwich) – (Maine) submarine sandwich^{[b]}
- logan (also pokelogan) – a shallow, swampy lake or pond (from Algonquian)^{[b]}
- muckle – to grasp, hold-fast, or tear into^{[b]}
- mud season – early spring

== Mid-Atlantic ==
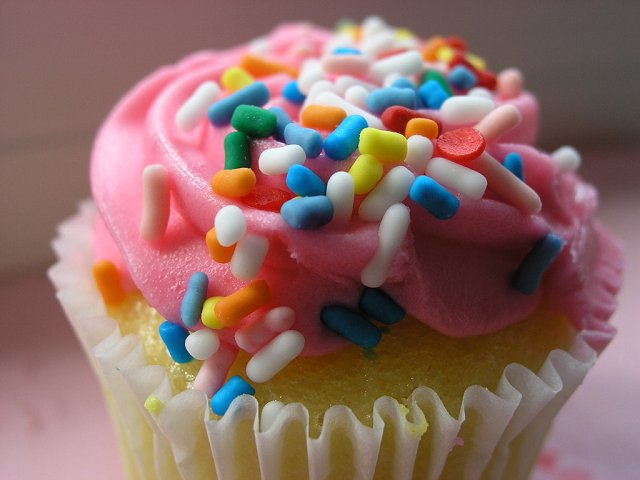
Jimmies or sprinkles

- breezeway – the space between two groups of rowhouses in the middle of a city block^{[b]}
- down the shore – shore areas and beaches of Southern New Jersey
- hoagie – submarine sandwich^{[b]}
- jawn – pronoun used for any person, place, or thing
- jimmies – sprinkles (ice cream topping) see also New England, above
- parlor – living room^{[b]}
- pavement – sidewalk^{[b]}
- shoobie – A visitor to the beach (typically the South Jersey shore) for the day (as contrasted with an overnight visitor)^{[b]}
- water ice – Italian ice
- yo! – Hello; also used to grab someone's attention
- youze – plural form of "you people"

=== Greater New York City ===
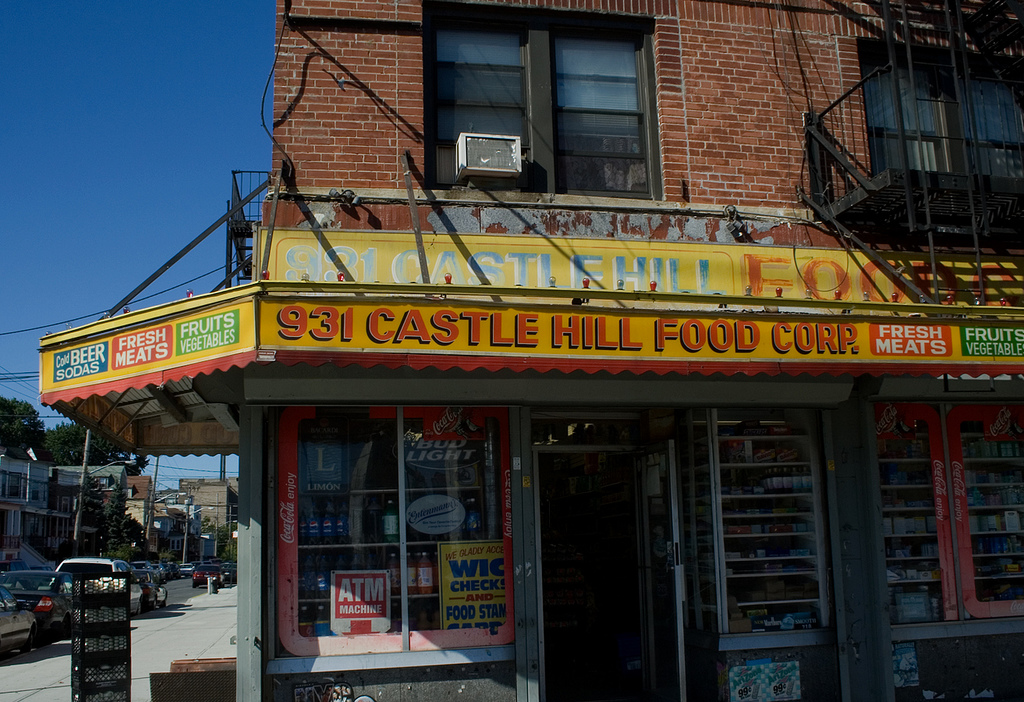
A bodega in the Bronx

- bodega – small corner grocery store, from the Spanish word for closet^{[b]}
- catty corner – on an angle to a corner^{[b]}
- dungarees (older) – jeans^{[b]}
- egg cream – a mixture of cold milk, flavored syrup, and seltzer^{[b]}
- have a catch – play catch^{[b]}
- hero – submarine sandwich^{[b]}
- kill – a small river or strait, in the name of specific watercourses; e.g. Beaver Kill, Fresh Kills, Kill Van Kull, Arthur Kill (from Dutch)^{[b]}
- on line – waiting or standing in a line^{[c]}
- potsy – hopscotch^{[b]}
- punchball and stickball – street variants of baseball, suitable for smaller urban areas, in which a fist or stick substitutes for the bat and a "Spaldeen" is the ball^{[b]}
- scallion – spring onion^{[b]}
- stoop – a small porch or steps in front of a building, originally from Dutch

== Midland ==
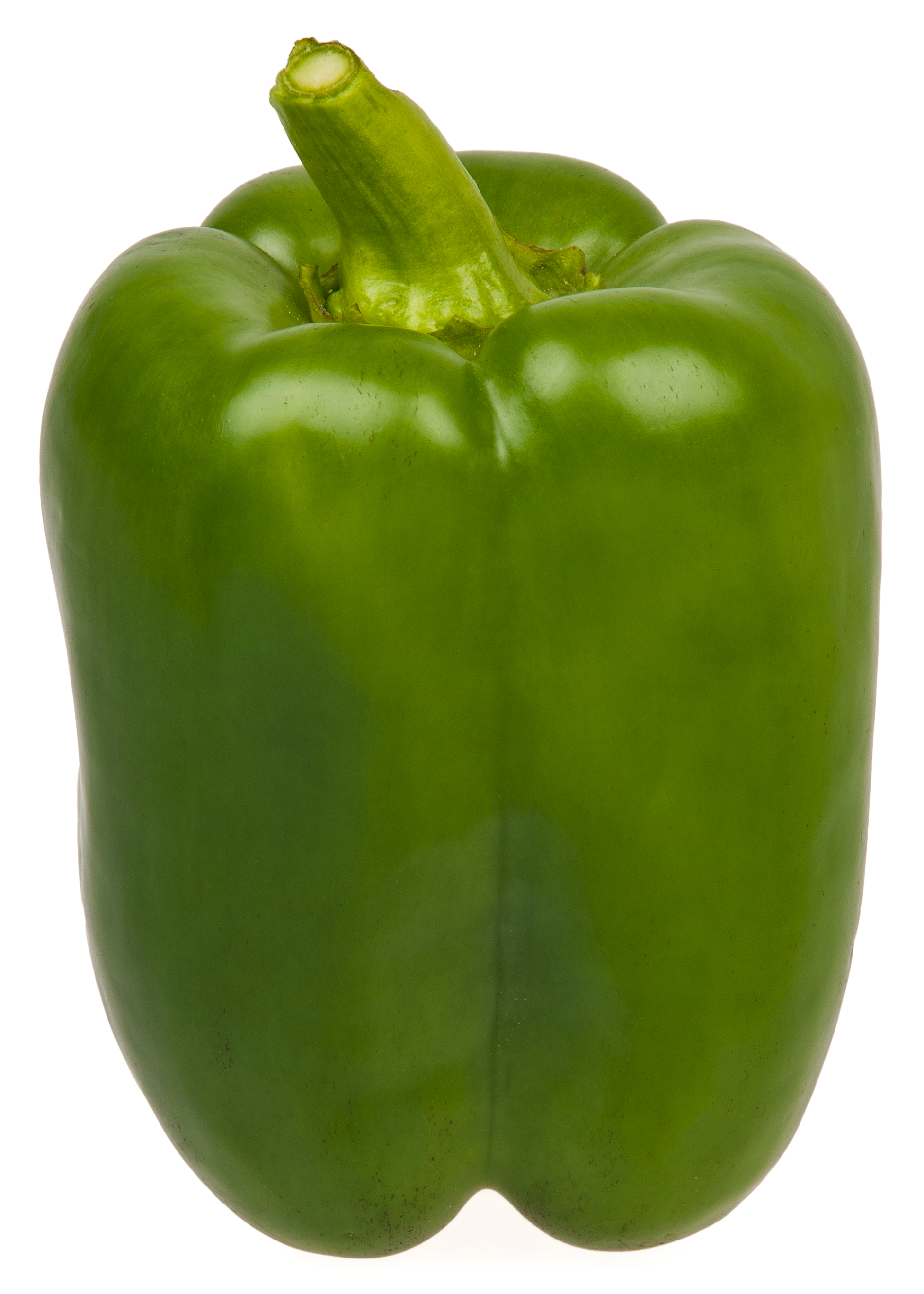
mango, pepper, or chili

- barn-burner (now widespread) – an exciting, often high-scoring game, esp. a basketball game^{[b]}
- hoosier (esp. Indiana) – someone from Indiana; (outside of Indiana, esp. in the St. Louis, Missouri area) a person from a rural area, comparable to redneck^{[c]}
- mango – green bell pepper, sometimes also various chili peppers^{[b]}
- outer road – a frontage road or other service road^{[b]}

A soft drink is generally known in the American Midland as pop, except for being soda around Greater St. Louis in Missouri and Illinois, and coke in central Indiana and central and western Oklahoma^{[d]}

== South ==
South
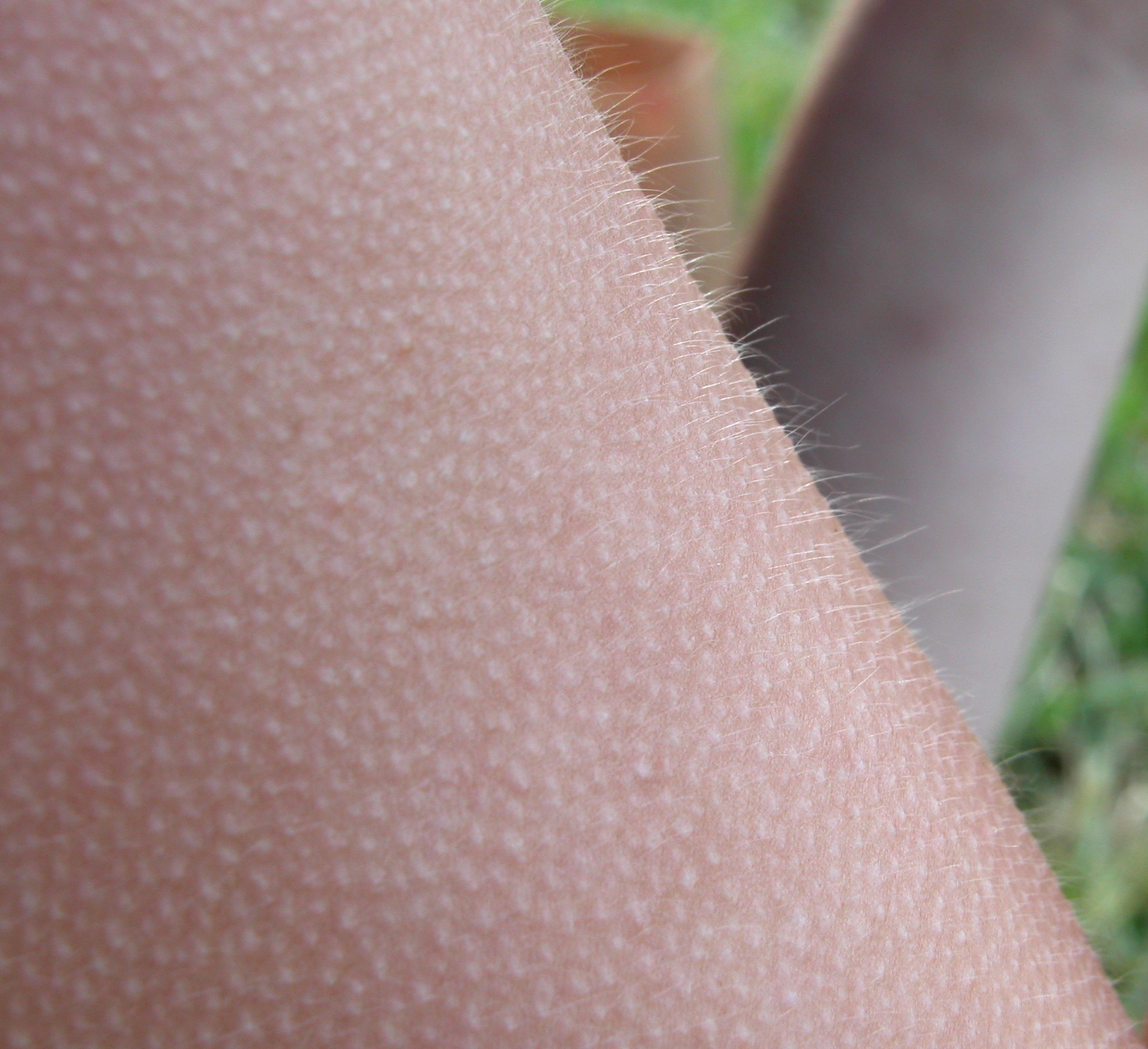
Chill bumps, goose bumps, or goose pimples

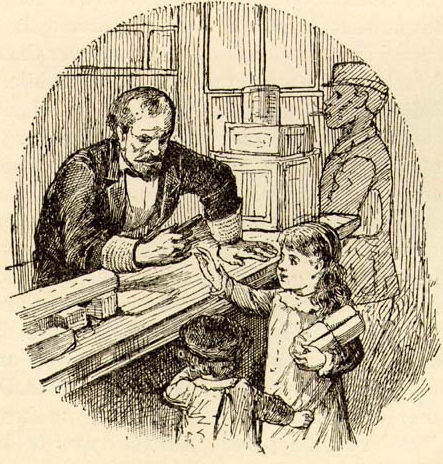
“We picked up one excellent word – a word worth travelling to New Orleans to get; a nice limber, expressive, handy word – ‘Lagniappe.’ They pronounce it lanny-yap: Mark Twain, Life on the Mississippi
- alligator pear – avocado^{[b]}
- banquette (southern Louisiana) – sidewalk, foot-path^{[b]}
- beaucoup (mostly Louisiana) – a large, indeterminate quantity of something ^{[b]}
- billfold (widespread, but infrequent Northeast, Pacific Northwest) – a man's wallet^{[b]}
- boss, bossman (widespread) – prison guard, or a boss that acts like a tyrant ^{[b]}
- cap (also Midlands) – sir (prob. from "captain")^{[b]}
- carryin on (widespread) – general bitching, complaining, etc. ^{[b]}
- certified, certifiable (Texas) – an insane person ^{[b]}
- charge up (widespread) – to confront someone ^{[b]}
- (to) check (widespread, esp. Texas) – to confront someone ^{[b]}
- chill bumps (also Midlands) – goose bumps^{[b]}
- chuck – toss or throw an object^{[c]} (now somewhat widespread)
- coke – any brand of soft drink^{[d]}
- commode (also Midlands) – bathroom; restroom; particularly the toilet itself^{[b]}
- crocus sack (Atlantic), croker sack (Gulf) – burlap bag^{[b]}
- cut on/off – to turn on/off^{[b]}
- directly – in a minute; soon; presently^{[b]}
- dirty rice (esp. Louisiana) – Cajun rice dish consisting of rice, spices, and meat^{[b]}
- dogpilin' (Appalachia) – when a bunch of people fight one person, or jump on the same object ^{[b]}
- Don't get above your raisin' - regional colloquialism
- fais-dodo (southern Louisiana) – a party^{[b]}
- fix – to get ready, to be on the verge of doing, e.g. "I'm fixing to go"; (widespread but esp. South) to prepare food^{[b]}
- high stylin' (widespread) – acting above one's station ^{[b]}
- high yellow (widespread) – a very light skinned Black person ^{[b]}
- holler (Appalachia) – a depression in the ground, a small valley ^{[b]}
- holler (older, general Southern) – to yell ^{[b]}
- holler at (widespread) – to confront someone ^{[b]}
- hootin' and hollerin' (older, general Southern) – carrying on, throwing a fit- also "a hootin and a hollerin" ^{[b]}
- house shoes – bedroom slippers^{[b]}
- knucklebones (Appalachia) – dice ^{[b]}
- kinfolk (widespread) – a distant relative, or someone with whom you have a family like relationship ^{[b]}
- lagniappe (Gulf, esp. Louisiana) – a little bit of something extra^{[b]}
- locker (esp. Louisiana) – closet^{[b]}
- lollygagging (older, Appalachia) – hanging around, doing nothing ^{[b]}
- lurkin' (older, widespread) – waiting around with criminal intent ^{[b]}
- make (age) (Gulf, esp. Louisiana) – have a birthday; "He's making 16 tomorrow."^{[b]}
- neutral ground (Louisiana, Mississippi) – median strip^{[b]}
- no account (widespread) – someone who is a liar, worthless, etc. ^{[b]}
- piddlin' or piddling around (older, widespread) – pretending to work, looking busy ^{[b]}
- pike (Tennessee) – an improved road, usually a four lane rural highway ^{[b]}
- po' boy (scattered, but esp. South) – a long sandwich, typically made with fried oysters, clams, or shrimp^{[b]}
- put up – put away, put back in its place^{[b]}
- redbone (deep South) – a pretty Black female with suspected Native American ancestry^{[b]}
- sack (Texas) – a small bag, used for groceries, etc. ^{[b]}
- sassin' (older, widespread) – talking back to someone, especially parents or a boss ^{[b]}
- scrap (widespread) – a fistfight, also scrapping or to scrap ^{[b]}
- shiftless (widespread) – someone who is lazy ^{[b]}
- straw boss (deep South, esp. Texas) – a fellow employee who acts like the boss ^{[b]}
- suds (Texas) – beer ^{[b]}
- tomcat (widespread) – a man who is known for cheating, being successful at getting laid ^{[b]}
- tomcattin' around (older, widespread) – a man trying to cheat on his girlfriend or wife ^{[b]}
- towheaded (widespread) – a person with blonde hair ^{[b]}
- totin' (Texas) – carrying something, usually a sack ^{[b]}
- trace (rare, Appalachia) – a path through the woods ^{[b]}
- washeteria (Texas) – a laundromat ^{[b]}
- yankee – northerner; also damn yankee, damned yankee^{[b]}
- yonder (esp. rural) – over there, or a long distance away; also over yonder

== West ==
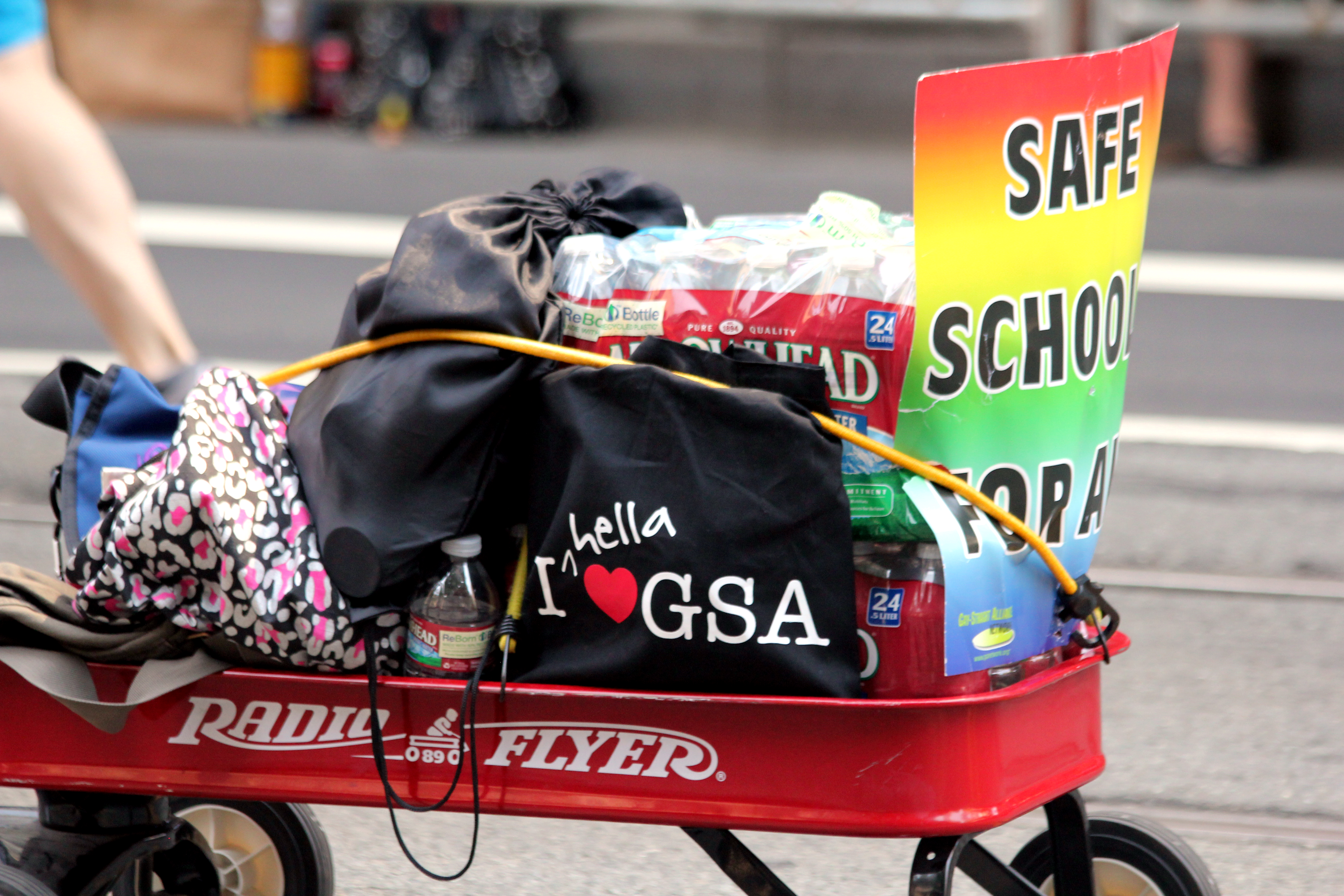
'Hella' as used in Northern California

- barrow pit (var. of "borrow pit") - an excavated area where material has been dug for use as fill at another location
- davenport (widespread) – couch or sofa^{[b]}
- hella or hecka (esp. San Francisco Bay Area) – "very" or "a lot of"
- pop (widespread in West and North); soda (predominates in California, Arizona, southern Nevada);^{[d]} coke (in parts of New Mexico and Tucson, Arizona) – sweetened carbonated beverage
- snowmachine (Alaska) – a motor vehicle for travel over snow. Outside Alaska known as a snowmobile

=== Pacific Northwest ===
- skid road or skid row – a path made of logs or timbers along which logs are pulled; (widespread) a run-down, impoverished urban area^{[b]}

== See also ==
- American and British English differences section Vocabulary
- General American
- List of dialects of the English language
- Names for soft drinks in the United States
- Sociolinguistics
