= 11th Transgender Erotica Awards =

US adult entertainment industry award

- Date: March 17, 2019
- Site: Avalon Hollywood, California
- Hosted by: Domino Presley

Highlights
- Best Film: 'Trans Pool Party' (Gender X)
- Most awards: Natalie Mars (3)
- Most nominations: Natalie Mars (12)

The 11th Annual Transgender Erotica Awards was a pornographic awards event recognizing the best in transgender pornography form the previous year from November 15, 2017 - November 15, 2018. Pre-nominations were open from October 4 to October 23, 2018.

The public-at-large was able to suggest nominees using an online form. Nominees were announced on November 26, 2018, online on the theteashow.com website, with fan voting opening on the same day. The winners were announced during the awards on March 17, 2019. The awards open to fan voting were the fan award which was open to all and site-specific awards which were open to members of the forums of the specific sites who met specific criteria regarding; a number of postings and a date to have been a member before.

== Winners and nominees ==
The nominations for the 11th Transgender Erotica Awards were announced online on November 26, 2018, and opened to fan voting on the same day, when pre-nominations closed, online on the theteashow.com website. The winners were announced during the awards on March 17, 2019.

=== Awards ===
Winners are listed first, highlighted in boldface.

Best New Face	Best Transman Model
**Khloe Kay**; Skylar Adams; Robin Banks; Melanie Brooks; Mia Bellamy; Kendall Penny; Kami Kartel; Jessy Bells; Crystal Thayer; Courtni Demilune; Amanda Taylor; Allysa Etain; Ally Sparkles	**Eddie Wood**; Tyler St. Syn; Nicko Wolfe; Buck Angel; Yoshiwara Niisan; Viktor Belmont; Trip Richards
Best Solo Model	Best Hardcore Model
**Casey Kisses**; Valentina Mia; Shiri Allwood; Ryder Monroe; Natassia Dreams; Natalie Mars; Megan Snow; Lena Kelly; Korra Del Rio; Kayleigh Coxx; Jessica Fappit; Janelle Fennec; Chloe Wilcox; Annabelle Lane	**Natalie Mars**; Khloe Kay; Lianna Lawson; River Enza; Lena Kelly; Ryder Monroe; Korra Del Rio; Kira Crash; Janelle Fennec; Domino Presley; Chanel Santini; Casey Kisses; Chelsea Marie; Aubrey Kate; Aspen Brooks
Best International Model	Ms. Unique
**Marissa Minx**; Nicole Flakita; Bianka Nascimento; Nicole Montero; Carol Penelope; Courtni Demilune; Miran; Mia Maffia; Estelle Mounty; Alice Blitz; Jelena Vermilion; Nikki Vicious; Red Vex; Sarina Havok; Vanessa Jhons	**Demii D Best**; Sofia Sanders; Jacquie Blu; Shemeatress; River Enza; Sophie Ladder; Nadia Love; Raven Roxx; Kristen Kraves; Kimber Haven; Kira Crash; Jean Jezebel; Brooke Zanell; Kacy TGirl; Betty Black; Alina Wang; Allysa Etain
Best Self-Producer	Cam Performer of the Year
**Lena Kelly**; Katie Fox; Vica TS; Shiri Allwood; Sarina Havok & Robin Coffins; Mia Maffia; Natalie Mars; Kimber Haven; Kelly Quell & Xena Kitty; Joanna Jet; Jamie French; Alina Wang; River Enza & Goddess Kyaa; Sasha de Sade & Mistress Murmur; Koko Beans & Amy Space Kitten; Alexandra Vexx; Betty Black	**Jessica Fappit**; TheGreatFairy; Thippy69; Kylie Maria; Danni Daniels; Karabella; Kelly Pierce; Korra Del Rio; Kimber Haven; Morgan Bailey; Nadia Vixen; Daisy Taylor; Casey Kisses; Wendy Williams; Rianna James
Best DVD	Best VR
**Trans Pool Party** (Gender X); Bob's TGirls and their Fucking Machines 4 (Grooby); TS Bosses (Transsensual); Trans-Visions 14 (Evil Angel); Trans Parent (Gender X); Transational Fantasies 4 (Transational Fantasies); Transational Fantasies 7 (Transational Fantasies); Trannylicious 2 (Devil's Film); Transsexual Girlfriend Experience 7 (Devil's Film); TC 3: Cock, Tails, & Whore Moans (Grooby); Shemale Scares (Bad Girl Mafia); Domino Presley's House of Whores (Grooby); TS Seduction Volume 11: Delightful Deviance (Kink); Aubrey Kate Plus 8 (Evil Angel); Joanna Jet Balls Deep (Third World Media)	**"Hypnotrans" with Korra Del Rio** (VRB Trans); "Cheerleader Dickstraction" with Casey Kisses and Riley Nixon (VRB Trans); "Game Over" with Alisia Rae (VRB Trans); "Stepmom's Secret Diary" with Domino Presley (VRB Trans); "Horrible Boss" with Chanel Santini (VRB Trans); "Late for Work" with Barbera Perez (Virtual Real Trans); "My Girl's Sister" with Natalie Mars (Virtual Real Trans); "Student Surprise" with Alisia Rae (Grooby VR); "Up For Sale" with Kendall Penny (Grooby VR); "Schoolgirl Seduction" with Jessy Bells (Grooby VR); "The Couchsurfer" with Bianka Nascimento (TS Virtual Lovers); "My Sex Life" with Mia Maffia (TS Virtual Lovers); "Hired" with Vanessa Johns (TS Virtual Lovers)
Best Girl/Girl Scene	Best Boy/Girl Scene
**Natalie Mars & Ella Nova "Learning the Joys of Anal"** (TransAngels); Nyxi Leon & Chelsea Marie "If I win, I get to fuck you" (Two Tgirls); Chanel Noir & Sydney Farron on TGirls.Porn (Grooby); jessica drake & Natassia Dreams "Carnal" (Wicked); Chanel Santini & Kimberlee "Cocked Behind Bar" (TransAngels); Chelsea Marie and Adriana Chechik "Trans-Visions #13" (Evil Angel); Aspen Brooks & Kristen Kraves "TGirls.Porn" (Grooby); Raven Roxx & Kimber Haven & Ryley "Shemale Apocalypse" (Bad Girl Mafia); Lena Kelly & Casey Kisses "Bad Kitties" (TransErotica); Lianna Lawson & Shiri Allwood "Hardcore" (TransErotica); Natalie Mars & River Enza & Goddess Kyaa "Threesome Dungeon Fetish" (TransErotica)	**Aubrey Kate – Gangbang "Aubrey Kate Plus 8" (Evil Angel)**; Crystal Malone & Dante Colle "Transsexual Hitchhikers" (Gender X); White Chinaa & Fernando "TGirls.xxx" (Grooby); Nala & B Flex "Black-TGirls.com" (Grooby); Janelle Fennec "Spanked & Spunked" (Transational Fantasies); Jean Jezebel "Spanked & Spunked" (Transational Fantasies); Jessy Dubai & Casey Kisses & Phoenix Marie & Eli Hunter "Active Booty" (TransAngels); Domino Presley & Gabriel Dalessandro "The Proposal" (TransAngels); Ryder Monroe & Michael DelRay "Trannylicious 2" (Devil's Film); Jane Marie & Damien Thorne "House of Whores" (Grooby); Natalie Mars – Gangbang "TS GangBangs" (Evil Angel); Chanel Santini & Lance Hart "Control Her" (TransAngels); Janelle Fennec & Will Havoc "Anal Archives" (TransAngels); Casey Kisses & Natalie Mars & Janelle Fennec & Lena Kelly – Gangbang "Trans Pool Party" (Gender X)
Best Solo Website	Best Internet Personality
**Mia Maffia - MiaMaffia.xxx**; Raven Roxx - RavenRoxx.com; Wendy Summers - WendySummers.com; TS-Jesse - TS-Jesse.com; Sasha deSade - SashadeSade.xxx; NikkiLadyboys.com; Natalie Mars - NatalieMars.com; Lena Kelly - LenaKelly.xxx; TS Kelly Clare - TSKellyClare.com; Joanna Jet - JoannaJet.com; Casey Kisses - CaseyKisses.xxx; Wendy Williams - WendyWilliamsxxx.com; Krissy 4 u - Krissy4u.com; TS Betty Black - TSBettyBlack.com	**River Enza**; Allysa Etain; Chanel Santini; Casey Kisses; Foxxy; Jacquie Blu; Jesse Flores; Jessica Fappit; Krissy4u; Kristen Kraves; Lena Kelly; Lianna Lawson; Natalie Mars; Natassia Dreams; Trixxy Von Tease
Best Photographer	Best Scene Producer
**Radius Dark**; Vee Soho; Tom Moore; Tedor Grekov; Scott Wallach; Sammy Mancini; Radius Dark; Kalin London; KilaKali; Jack Flash; Frank; Bob Maverick	**Aiden Starr**; Alex Nash; Buddy Wood; Dana Vespoli; Damien Cain; Jim Powers; Joey Silvera; Luiz Damazo; Omar Wax; Radius Dark; Sammy Mancini; Sadie Lola
Best Non-TS Female Performer	Best Non-TS Male Performer
**Lindsey Love**; Riley Nixon; Robin Coffins; Mercy West; Jessica Drake; Mona Wales; Lexi Sindel; Kenzie Taylor; Goddess Kyaa; Jasmeen Lefleur	**Michael DelRay**; Christian XXX; Lance Hart; D. Arclyte; Dante Colle; Corbin Dallas; Colby Jansen; Will Havoc; Soldier Boi; Smash Thompson; Sergeant Miles; Rob Yaeger; Rick Fantana; Pierce Paris; Mike Panic
Best Clipsite Model	MV Trans Model of the Year
**Mandy Mitchell**; Natalie Mars; Daisy Taylor; Vicats; Venus Lux; Nicole Montero; Sasha de Sade; TripleXTransManXXX; Boring Kate; Dax the Trap; Marissa Minx; Cyd St Vincent	**Natalie Mars**; ChanelSantini; Icy Winters; Julie Prim; Lena Kelly; Liberty Harkness; Raven Babe; Sasha de Sade; Shiri Allwood; surpriseitssteak; TgirlOneGuy; VicaTS
Transational Fantasy Girl of the Year	Kinkiest Tgirl Domme
**Janelle Fennec**	**Jessica Foxx**
Bobs TGirls Model of the Year	Fan Choice Award
**Natassia Dreams** and **Foxxy** [Tie]	**Daisy Taylor**
Best Industry Professional	Transcendence Award
**Alec Helmy**	**Chanel Santini**
Gender X Model of the Year	Black TGirls Model of the Year
**Lena Kelly**	**Megan Snow**
Lifetime Achievement Award
**Fran and Transational Fantasies** and **Morgan Bailey**
