= Cooch Behar (disambiguation) =

Cooch Behar (also Koch Bihar and Kuch Bahar) is a town in the Indian state of West Bengal and headquarters of Cooch Behar District.

Cooch Behar may also refer to:

- Cooch Behar District, a political subdivision of the Indian state of West Bengal
- Cooch Behar (Lok Sabha constituency), a Lok Sabha (lower house) constituency of India
- Cooch Behar Uttar (Vidhan Sabha constituency)
- Cooch Behar Dakshin (Vidhan Sabha constituency)
- Cooch Behar I (community development block)
- Cooch Behar II (community development block)
- Cooch Behar railway station
- New Cooch Behar railway station
- Cooch Behar State Railway
- Cooch Behar Airport
- Cooch Behar Palace
- Cooch Behar State, the historical kingdom

== See also ==
- Cooch (disambiguation)
- Behar (disambiguation)
- Koch (disambiguation)
- Bihar (disambiguation)
- Bahar (disambiguation)
