= Sofa (disambiguation) =

A sofa is a piece of furniture, also called a couch.

Sofa or SOFA may refer to:

== People ==
- Sofa (warrior), slave-soldiers in the Mali Empire and its successor states
- Ahmed Sofa (1943–2001), a Bangladeshi writer
- Sofa Landver (born 1949), Israeli politician

== Places ==
- SoFA District, an area of San Jose, California, US

== Music ==
- Sofa (Canadian band), a Montreal-based band that was active from 1993 to 1997
- "Sofa" (Frank Zappa song), a composition by American musician, Frank Zappa from the 1975 album One Size Fits All
- "Sofa Song" (song), 2005 single by The Kooks off the album Inside In/Inside Out
- Sofa Sound, recording studio founded by Peter Hammill

== Software ==
- Standards of Fundamental Astronomy, an astronomical software library
- SOFA (component system), an open source framework for designing and implementing component-based applications
- Spatially Oriented Format for Acoustics, a file format for storing spatially oriented acoustic data like head-related transfer functions
- Simulation Open Framework Architecture, an open-source framework primarily targeted at real-time physical simulation
- SOFA Statistics, an open-source statistical package

== Other uses ==
- The Sofa: A Moral Tale, a 1742 libertine novel by Claude Prosper Jolyot de Crébillon
- SOFA score (sequential organ failure assessment), used to track a patient's status during the stay in an intensive care unit
- Status of forces agreement, an agreement between a country and a foreign nation stationing military forces in that country
- Statement of Financial Affairs, a form attached to a debtor's petition for bankruptcy in the United States

== See also ==
- sofa.com, online UK furniture store
- SofaStore.com, online UK furniture store, brick-and-mortar store as Oak Furniture Land
- "The New Sofa" (episode), an episode of the UK sitcom The Royle Family
- Moving sofa problem
- Behind the sofa
- Couch (disambiguation)
- Settee (disambiguation)
- Sofa King (disambiguation)
- Sofia (disambiguation)
