= Stanford US–Russia Forum =

The Stanford US–Russia Forum (SURF) is an organization dedicated to bringing students at leading Russian and American universities together for research in public policy, business, economics and many other disciplines. The program begins with a fall conference in Russia, followed by six months of work on collaborative research projects and a capstone conference in the spring at Stanford University. Currently in its tenth year, more than 400 undergraduate, graduate, and professional school students from Russia and the U.S. have participated in the program.

== History ==
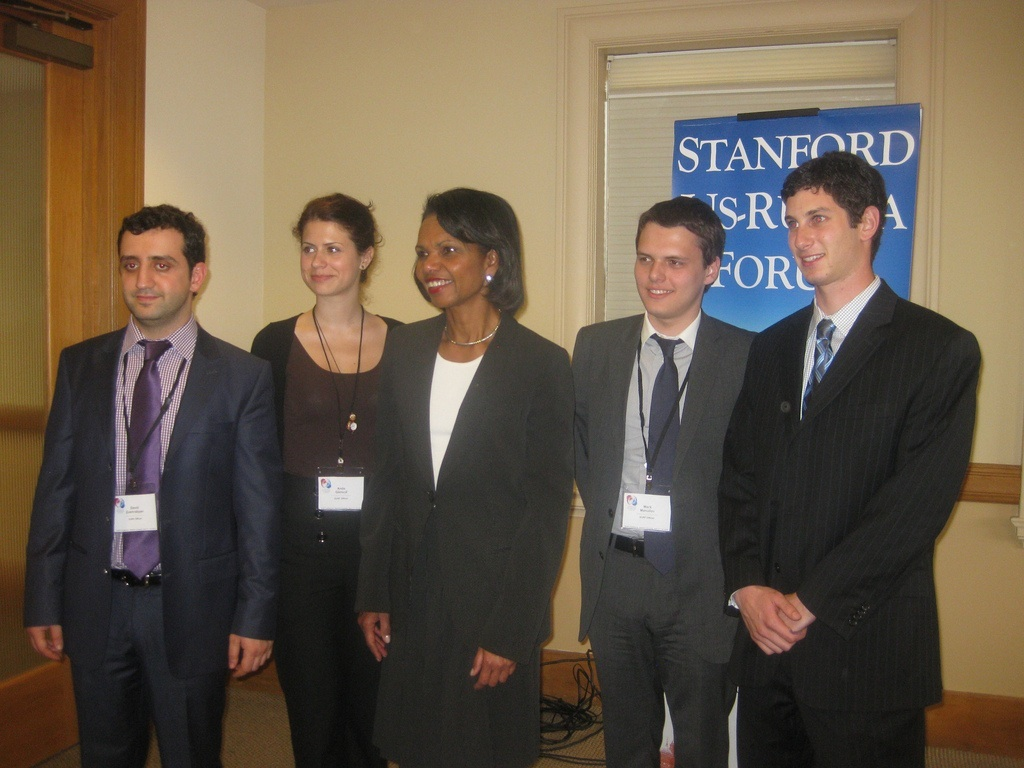
SURF organizers with Condoleezza Rice

SURF was founded in the fall of 2008 by four students from Stanford University and Moscow State University who wanted to maintain dialogue on U.S.-Russia cooperation despite the deterioration in relations caused by the Russo-Georgian war.

SURF’s first public event was a one-day conference in November 2008 at Moscow State University focused on the most pressing problems in US-Russian relations. The conference attracted widespread student interest and was attended by delegates from MSU, MGIMO, the Higher School of Economics, the Academy of National Economy, as well as students from Stanford University, Yale University and University of Pennsylvania.

In the fall of 2009, the organization launched the SURF Exchange Program, a six-month program for twenty American and twenty Russian students, selected on a competitive basis. During the fall, the SURF delegates participated in a series of virtual seminars with guest lecturers including Dmitri Trenin (Director, Carnegie Moscow Center) and Donald Kennedy (Editor, Science). In the winter, the delegates continued to meet virtually in small groups that researched and produced Collaborative Research Projects (CRP). The program concluded with a week-long capstone conference at Stanford University in April 2010. The capstone conference brought together organizers, participants and sponsors of SURF, as well as a number of special guests. Speakers included the 66th U.S. Secretary of State Condoleezza Rice, Assistant to the President of the Russian Federation Arkady Dvorkovich, and Former Adviser to US President Bill Clinton for Russia and Ukraine Coit Blacker. Following the conference, the CRP results were published in the SURF Journal. The first SURF Exchange Program was formally recognized for its work fostering civil society ties between the US and Russia by Russian Minister for Foreign Affairs Sergei Lavrov.

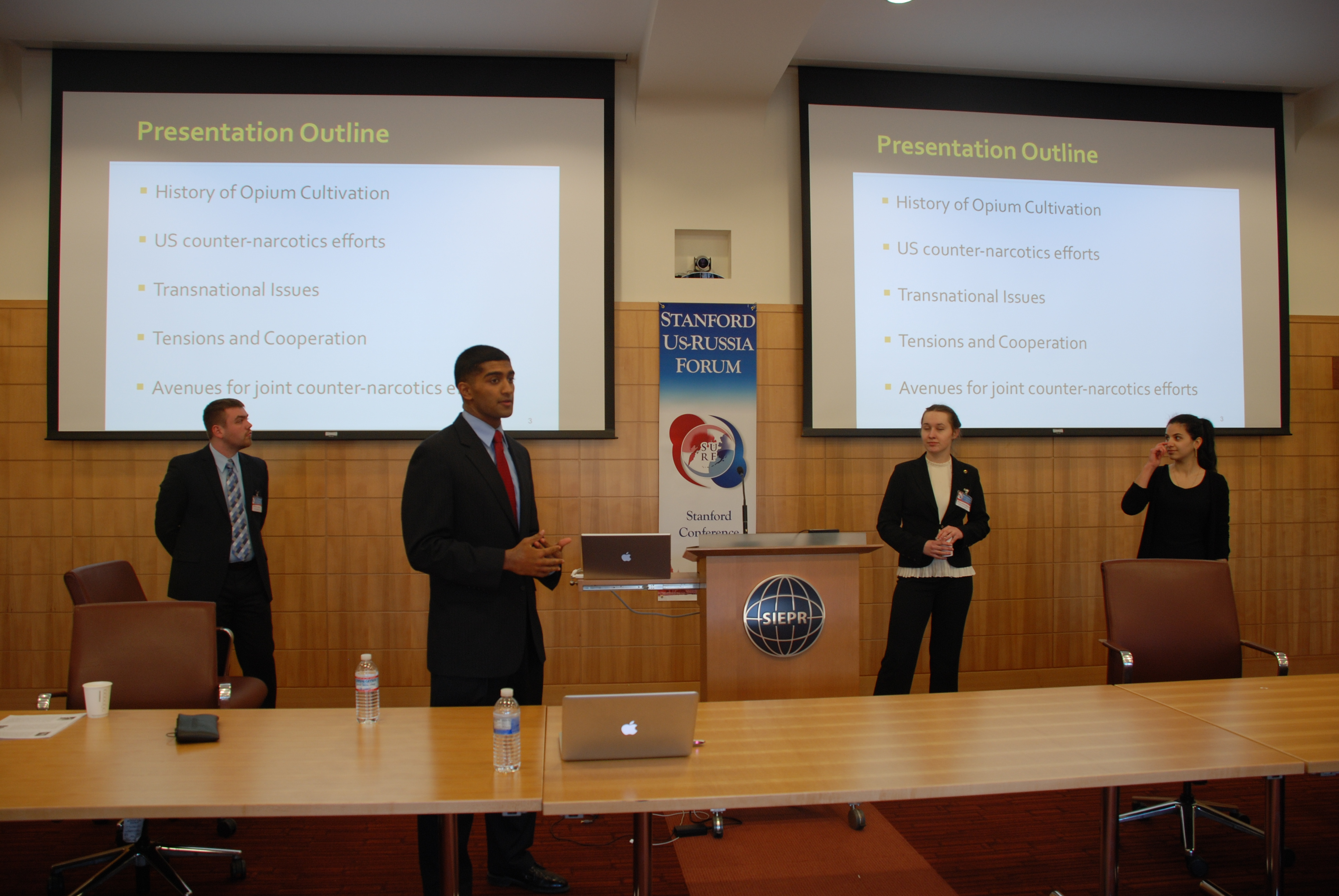
Delegates present their CRP

== Program ==
=== Structure ===
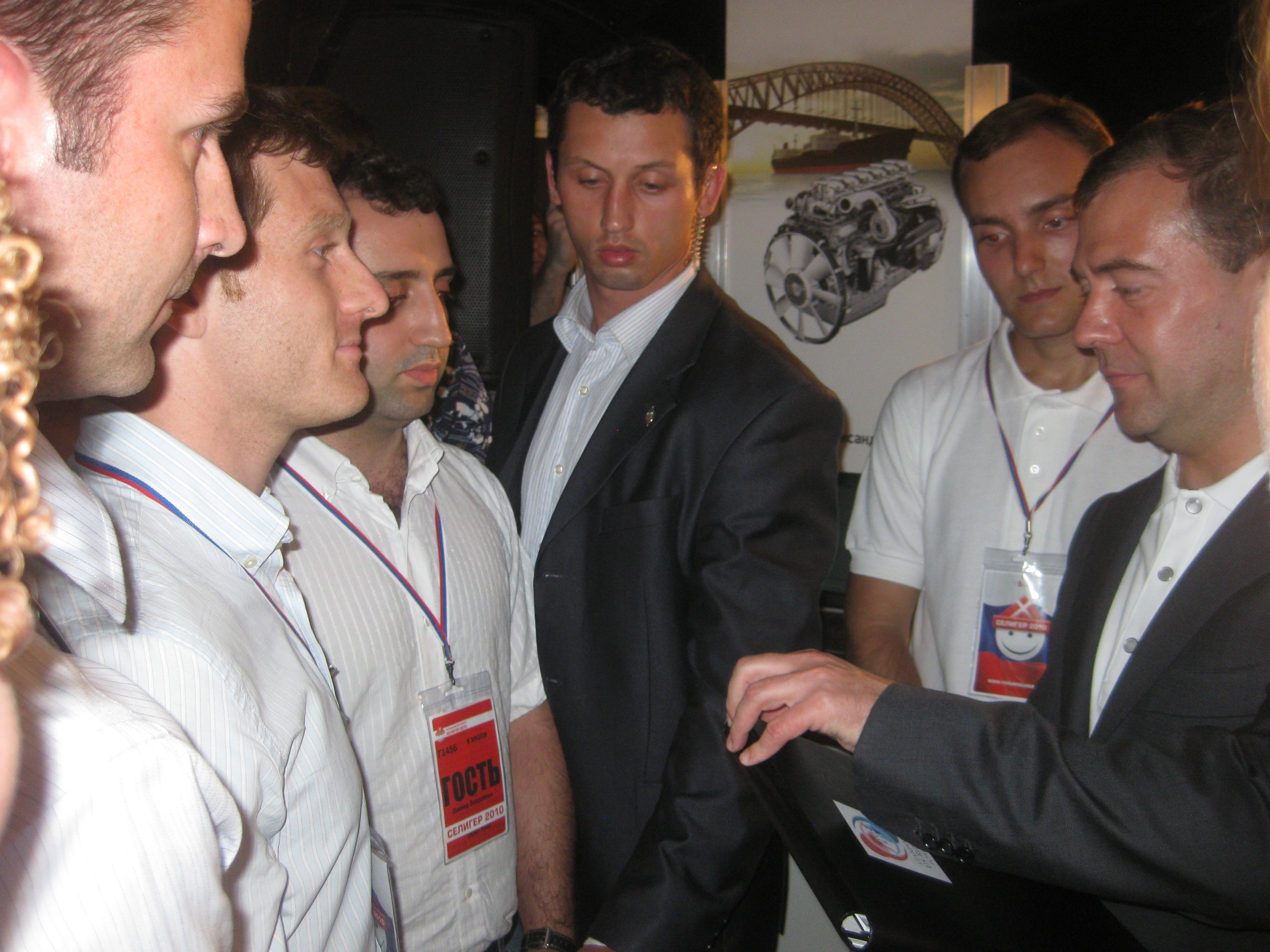
SURF alumni with Dmitry Medvedev

Since 2010, the SURF Exchange Program has consisted of two major components: conferences and Collaborative Research Projects (CRP). The program opens each fall with a week-long conference in Moscow where delegates meet with experts in academia, business, and policy to learn about current issues in U.S.-Russia relations. The 20 American and 20 Russian delegates also meet in person for the first time and finalize their research questions for their four-person research teams.

The collaborative research component lasts for six months. Research topics have included cyber-security, public health, nuclear and energy issues, news and the media, space cooperation, entrepreneurship and business, cooperation in the Arctic, the environment, and a number of others. In some cases, groups are paired with sponsoring institutions that submit problems or questions for the group to research, to ensure that each CRP group produced work relevant to the real world. Sponsoring institutions have included the Carnegie Endowment for International Peace, the Russian Ministry of Energy, Stanford Institute for Economic Policy Research, Renova Group, Draper Fisher Jurvetson and The Boeing Company.

In the spring, the students meet at Stanford University for a capstone conference to present their research to policy-makers and other experts. Talks are also held with notable experts from a wide range of fields to deepen participants’ knowledge of U.S.-Russia relations.

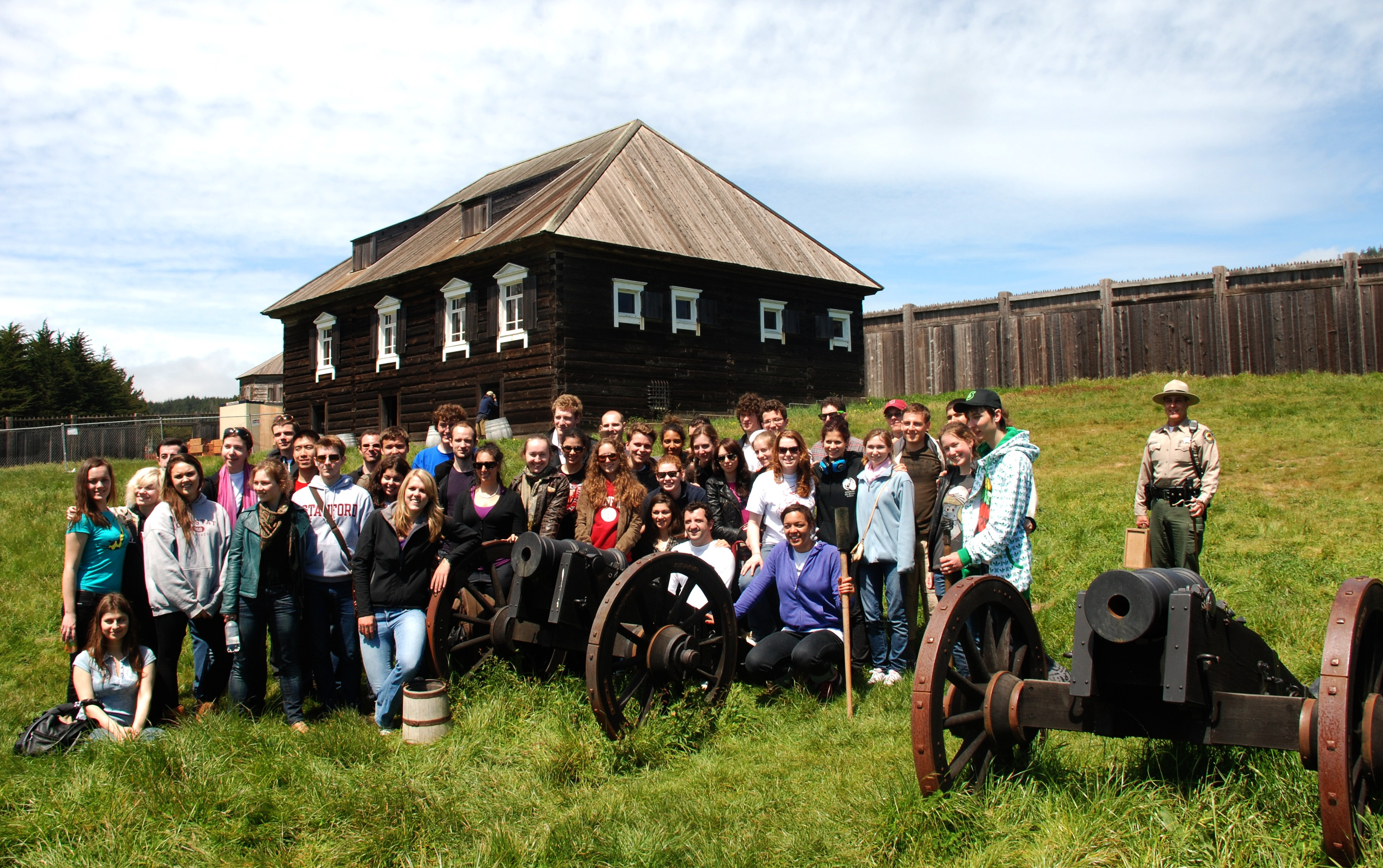
Delegates in Fort Ross

SURF is housed at the Freeman Spogli Institute for International Studies (FSI) at Stanford University and it is also supported by its founding partner universities, Moscow State University, Moscow State Institute of International Relations (University) of the MFA of Russia (MGIMO), the Higher School of Economics (NRU-HSE), and the Academy of National Economy.

=== Participants ===
More than 40 students from over 40 Russian, American and international universities have participated in SURF since the program’s inception. The program accepts undergraduate, graduate, and professional school students from all disciplines, and no previous exposure to Russia is required. Instead, the program prioritizes intellectual curiosity, leadership and impact potential, and research skills. Selection for participation in the program is very competitive; the overall acceptance rate for the 2014-2015 program was 7.5%.

=== Notable speakers ===
- Coit Blacker, former Special Assistant to the President of the United States for National Security Affairs and Senior Director for Russian, Ukrainian, and Eurasian Affairs at the National Security Council
- Steven Chu, former U.S. Secretary of Energy
- Arkady Dvorkovich, Deputy Prime Minister of Russia
- Siegfried Hecker, former Director of Los Alamos Labs
- Michael McFaul, former U.S. Ambassador to Russia, former Special Assistant to the President and Senior Director of Russian and Eurasian Affairs.
- William Perry, former U.S. Secretary of Defense
- Condoleezza Rice, former U.S. Secretary of State
- George Shultz, former U.S. Secretary of State
- Dmitri Trenin, Director of Carnegie Endowment for International Peace, Moscow Center

== Universities represented ==
=== US Universities ===
- American University
- Boston College
- Bowdoin College
- Brandeis University
- Columbia University
- Cornell University
- George Washington University
- Georgia Institute of Technology
- Harvard University
- Middlebury College
- New York University Stern School of Business
- Northwestern University Feinberg School of Medicine
- Princeton University
- Rice University
- Stanford University
- Swarthmore College
- University of California, Berkeley
- University of California, Davis
- University of California, Los Angeles
- University of Chicago
- University of Kansas
- University of Minnesota
- University of Pennsylvania
- University of Rochester
- University of Southern California
- Wellesley College
- Yale University

=== Russian Universities ===
- Far Eastern Federal University
- Institute for US and Canadian Studies (ISKRAN)
- Kazan Federal University
- Moscow School of Management SKOLKOVO
- Moscow State University
- Moscow State Institute of International Relations (MGIMO)
- National Research University Higher School of Economics
- New Economic School
- North-Eastern Federal University (Yakutsk)
- Plekhanov Russian University of Economics
- Russian Presidential Academy of National Economy and Public Administration (RANEPA)
- Saint Petersburg State University
- Samara State University
- Skolkovo Institute of Science and Technology
- Southern Federal University

=== International Universities ===
- American University of Afghanistan
- Bocconi University
- Cambridge University
- London Business School
- University of Passau
