= Sofa King =

Sofa King is a pun on "so fucking" and may specifically refer to:

- "Sofa King" (song), a song in the Danger Doom album The Mouse and the Mask
- Sofa King, a gag name of a hypothetical furniture store used during a Saturday Night Live skit

== See also ==
- Sofa King Cool (album), third studio album of Diesel Boy, a pop-punk rock band
- Sofa King Killer, a former American sludge metal band from Akron, Ohio
- Sofa (disambiguation)
