= James Massterson =

American football coach

Coaching career (HC unless noted)
- 1898: Fordham

Head coaching record
- Overall: 1–1–2

James Massterson was an American college football coach. He served as the co-head football coach at Fordham University, in New York City, with John Couch for one season in 1898. Together they compiled a record of 1–1–2.

== Head coaching record ==
Year	Team	Overall	Conference	Standing	Bowl/playoffs
Fordham (Independent) (1898)
1898	Fordham	1–1–2			
Fordham:		1–1–2			
Total:		1–1–2			
