= Koch =

Koch may refer to:

== People ==
- Koch (surname), people with this surname
- Koch dynasty, a dynasty in Assam and Bengal, north east India
- Koch family
- Koch people (or Koche), an ethnic group originally from the ancient Koch kingdom in north east India
  - Koch languages, Sino-Tibetan language family
    - Koch language, a language spoken in India and Bangladesh
- Koch, an alternate name of the Rabha people, in northeast India and surrounding countries
  - Rabha language, their language
- Koch Kingdom, in and around Assam

== Places ==
- Koch (crater), a crater on the Moon
- Koch, Iran (disambiguation), places in Iran
- Koch, Łódź Voivodeship, a village in central Poland
- Koch, Mississippi, United States
- Koch, South Sudan, a village in Unity State, South Sudan
- Koch Bihar, a princely state in north east India
- Koch County, an administrative area in Unity State, South Sudan
- Koch Kingdom, Assam, 13th-16th centuries

== Businesses ==
- Koch Entertainment LP, now known as E1 Entertainment
  - Koch Records, former name of Entertainment One Music
- Koch Industries, petroleum, chemicals, energy, and commodities trading
- Koch Media, a media distribution company from Germany
- Koch Foods Poultry processor and distributor.

== Other uses ==
- Koch (boat), a type of Arctic boat
- Koch method of learning Morse Code
- Koch snowflake or star, and Koch curve
- Koch's triangle, an anatomical area of the Human heart
- Koch's postulates, the criteria required to establish the etiology of an infectious disease
- Mycobacterium tuberculosis (Koch's bacillus), a bacterial species that causes tuberculosis
- Koch (film), a 2012 documentary film about New York City mayor Ed Koch

== See also ==
- Heckler & Koch, maker of firearms
- Koch Institute (disambiguation)
- Kotch, a 1971 film starring Walter Matthau
- Coke (disambiguation), a homophone of some pronunciations of Koch
- Cooch Behar (disambiguation), also Koch Bihar, city in India
