= Couch (surname) =

Couch is a surname. It has two different origins. It is a Cornish name thought to have derived from Cornish "cough" (red) and to have been a nickname for a redheaded man (the usual Cornish pronunciation is "cooch"). The Cornish surname appears in 1160 as "Coh" and over the centuries as "Coch," "Cogh," "Cooch," "Cough," "Cuche," "Cowche," "Cowtch," "Coutch," etc., until the spelling became standardized in recent centuries, generally as "Couch." There is also an English name Couch which probably originated as a name for a maker of beds or bedding. The English surname has variant forms Coucha, Couche, Coucher, Couchman and Cowcha.

Notable people with the surname include:

- Alan Couch (born 1953), Welsh footballer
- Arthur Quiller-Couch (1863–1944), Cornish writer and professor of literature, grandson of Jonathan Couch
- Charles Couch (1833–1911), American politician
- DaNae Couch, American beauty pageant winner
- Darius N. Couch (1822–1897), American soldier, businessman, and naturalist
- Ethan Couch (born 1997), North Texas teenager convicted of killing four pedestrians
- Harvey C. Couch (1877–1941), Arkansas energy entrepreneur and businessman
- James F. Couch Jr. (c. 1918–1990), justice of the Maryland Court of Appeals
- Jane Couch (born 1968), British woman boxer
- John Couch (fl. 1890s), American football coach
- John H. Couch (1811–1870), American sea captain and pioneer in the Oregon Country in the 19th century
- Jonathan Couch (1789–1870), Cornish naturalist
- Lana Couch (1941–2007), American aerospace engineer
- Mal Couch (1938–2013), American Christian writer
- Marcos Couch (born 1960), Argentine mountain climber
- Richard Quiller Couch, British naturalist, son of Jonathan Couch
- Rebecca Couch (1788–1863), American painter
- Tim Couch, former NFL quarterback
- Tonia Couch, British Olympic diver
- Warrick Couch, Australian astronomer
- William Couch, leader of the Oklahoma Boomer movement
- William Terry Couch (1901–1989), American intellectual and academic editor

== See also ==
- Couch's Mill, a hamlet in Cornwall
- The John H. Couch, a side-wheel driven steamboat built in 1863
