= Sofa surfing (disambiguation) =

Sofa surfing, also known as couch surfing, is the practice of staying in another's house for free

It can also refer to:

- Sofa Surfers (band), an Austrian rock and electronic music band
- Sofa Surfers (TV series), a 2009 British documentary
- "Sofa Surfer Girl” (song), a song by The Orchid Highway

== See also ==
- Couch surfing (disambiguation)
