= Surf clam =

Surf clam may refer to:

- Spisula sachalinensis, also known as Sakhalin surf clam, commonly used for sushi (hokkigai)
- Spisula solida, native to the British Isles
- Spisula solidissima, also known as Atlantic surf clam, native to northeastern North America
