= Coke (surname) =

Coke is a surname. Notable people with the surname include:

- Christopher Coke (born 1969), convicted drug lord in Jamaica
- David Coke (1915–1941), British Second World War pilot
- Dorothy Coke (1897–1979), British artist
- Edward Coke (disambiguation), several people
- Giles Coke (born 1986), English footballer
- Jānis Čoke (1878–1910), Latvian revolutionary and bank robber
- John Coke (disambiguation), several people
- John Talbot Coke (1841–1912), British Army major-general
- Octavius Coke (1840–1895), American lawyer and politician
- Peter Coke (1913–2008), British actor, playwright and artist
- Phil Coke (born 1982), American Major League Baseball pitcher
- Richard Coke (1829–1897), American lawyer and politician, governor of Texas and United States senator
- Richard Coke Jr. (1790–1851), American lawyer and politician, uncle of Octavius and Richard Coke
- Richard Toby Coke (born 1954), English politician
- Sir Robert Coke, 2nd Baronet (1645–1688), English Member of Parliament in 1685
- Roger Sacheverell Coke (1912–1972), English composer and pianist
- Thomas Coke (disambiguation), several people
- Van Deren Coke (1921–2004), American photographer, scholar and museum professional

== See also ==
- John Coke Smyth (1808–1882), British artist and traveller
