= William Cooch =

New Zealand artist, architect and stamp designer

William J. Cooch (22 July 1898 – 17 September 1950) was a New Zealand artist, architect and stamp designer.

Cooch was born in Ireland and was one of four children of Lieutenant William Cooch of the 1st Royal Munster Fusiliers. Cooch trained as an architect in London and on 18 October 1922 married Mary Amelia Devanney. In the same year Cooch and his wife joined with his parents and siblings to emigrate to New Zealand. Cooch and his wife Mary had two daughters Pat and Angela.

Cooch settled in Wellington and gained employment as a government architect. One of the projects he worked on was Government House in Wellington. In his spare time, Cooch created prints working in woodcuts and linocuts. Both he and his sister, Louise Orgias (née Cooch) were members of the New Zealand Academy of Fine Arts. Cooch has examples of his works in the Auckland Art Gallery and also the Museum of New Zealand Te Papa Tongarewa.

Cooch was also a fine calligrapher and was involved in producing certificates for the refurbishment of the Waitangi Treaty House in the 1930s and also for the Disabled Servicemen's Training Centre in Riccarton, New Zealand in 1947.

Cooch also designed and etched designs for New Zealand postage stamps, notably the 1935 5d Swordfish in ultramarine as well as the Hygeia Goddess of Health, health stamp of 1932.
