= SOFA (component system) =

SOFA component system
- Developer: Distributed Systems Research Group
- Stable release: Beta / March 2009
- Written in: Java
- Operating system: Linux, Windows
- Type: Component System
- License: LGPL
- Website: http://sofa.ow2.org

SOFA 2 is a component system developed by Distributed Systems Research Group at Charles University in Prague. It provides many advanced features: ADL-based design, behavior specification and verification based on behavior protocols, software connectors supporting different communication styles and providing transparent distribution of applications. SOFA 2 can be used not only for modeling component-based applications but also as a complete framework supporting all the stages of an application lifecycle from development to execution.

== SOFA 2 basis ==
The SOFA 2 system includes a component model, repository of components, runtime environment and tool support.

=== Component Model ===
SOFA 2 component model is defined by means of its meta-model which captures core concepts and states relation among them.

=== Repository ===
SOFA 2 provides a repository of a components which is automatically generated from the meta-model.

=== Tool support ===
- Cushion - is a text-based tool which allows development of SOFA 2 applications and manipulation with a repository
- SOFA IDE - is a graphical tool (plugin for Eclipse)
- MConsole - is a plugin for Eclipse (as well as a standalone application) monitoring and maintaining SOFA 2 runtime environment

== SOFA application lifecycle ==
- application design
- component development, adaptation
- application assembly
- application deployment
- application execution - monitoring, maintaining

== See also ==
- Component-based software engineering
