= Dante Colle =

American pornographic film actor

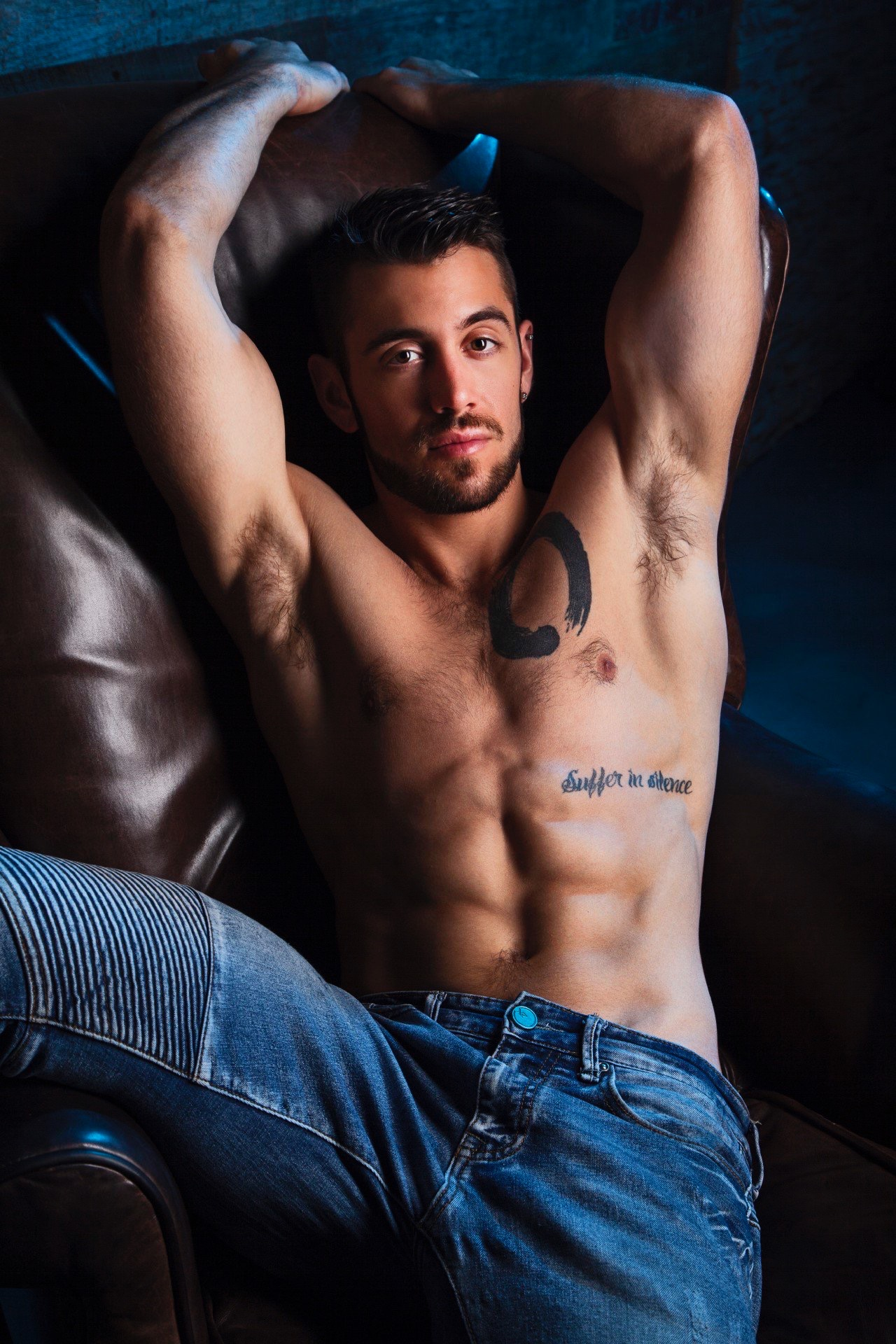
- Dante Colle on set for Raging Stallion, 2019
- Born: Alec Mark Kompanik; 2 August 1994 (age 32); Addison, Illinois, United States
- Occupation: Actor
- Years active: 2013–present
- Height: 5 ft 11 in (180 cm)
- Website: DanteColleXXX.com

Dante Colle (born Alec Mark Kompanik, August 2, 1994) is an American pornographic film actor and model, who is known for starring in gay, straight, bisexual, and transgender pornography.

== Career ==
Colle began his career in the adult film industry in 2013 at the age of 18 with the studio Corbin Fisher, after responding to their Backpage ad.

It was only a few months after graduating from high school, that he decided to shoot his first porn scene. In the summer, he shot six gay porn scenes, then in August he went into the military. In an interview with AVN, Colle said that he was training for Special Forces, when his instructors found out about his porn career. They looked into his records, and found that he had lied about his asthma, and processed him out. He returned to porn after 2 years of military service.

He worked for Corbin Fisher under the alias "Ryder", and stayed in an exclusive contract with them for about 4 years. In 2017, he changed his stage name to "Dante Colle".

Starting as a versatile performer in gay porn, he soon branched out into other parts of the industry, such as fetish, bisexual, transsexual, and straight. Often called a "sexually fluid leading man", he wrote an op-ed in 2021 about "bridging straight and LGBT stardom and building careers in both worlds".

Colle, who describes himself as "Hippie in the streets, GQ in the sheets", is known for cumming at least twice in his scenes; and hence has been nicknamed "Double Load Dante".

== Personal life ==
Colle was born in Addison, Illinois in a family with Slovak/Italian/Irish heritage. He grew up in the suburbs of Chicago, and attended Addison Trail High School.

He has been mentioned as being bisexual or pansexual, however, he doesn't identify with any label of sexuality. He believes in sexual fluidity, but leans towards women, and hadn't kissed a guy before his first gay porn scene.

In 2020, he got a vasectomy, to not impose contraception on his female partners, due to the "TERRIBLE side effects" they can have.

In his AVN feature interview, he mentioned that riding motorcycles was his biggest passion and the thing that made him happiest off set. He has an enso tattoo on his left pectoral, and a tattoo that reads "Suffer in silence" under it.

== Awards and nominations ==
| Year | Award Show | Award | Film | Result | Ref(s) |
|---|---|---|---|---|---|
| 2018 | Straight Up Gay Porn | Best Bottoming Performance Electric Sex 4 | N/A | Nominated | |
| 2018 | Straight Up Gay Porn | Best Versatile Scene | Dante & Austin Flip Fuck | Won | |
| 2019 | AVN | Nominee: Best Transsexual Sex Scene | Transsexual Girlfriend Experience 7 | Nominated | |
| 2019 | TEAS | Best Boy/Girl Scene | Transsexual Hitchhikers | Nominated | |
| 2019 | TEAS | Best Non-TS Performer (Male) | N/A | Nominated | |
| 2019 | PornHub Awards | M4M Most Popular Gay Performer | N/A | Nominated | |
| 2020 | Straight Up Gay Porn | Best Actor | Scared Stiff 2: The Amityville Whore | Nominated | |
| 2020 | Straight Up Gay Porn | Favorite Duo Scene | Bareback Crashpad | Nominated | |
| 2020 | Straight Up Gay Porn | Performer of the Year | N/A | Nominated | |
| 2020 | TEAS | Best Boy/Girl Scene | Hot For Transsexuals 10 | Nominated | |
| 2020 | TEAS | Best Non-TS Male Performer | N/A | Nominated | |
| 2020 | XBIZ | Gay Performer of the Year | N/A | Nominated | |
| 2020 | GAYVN | Best Bi Sex Scene | Coming Out Bi 7 | Nominated | |
| 2020 | GAYVN | Best Fetish Scene | Gay Super Villans | Nominated | |
| 2020 | GAYVN | Best Group Sex Scene | Night Riders | Nominated | |
| 2020 | GAYVN | Best Supporting Actor | At Large | Won | |
| 2020 | GAYVN | Performer of the Year | N/A | Nominated | |
| 2020 | CyberSocket | Best Pornstar | N/A | Nominated | |
| 2020 | CyberSocket | Best Sex Scene | Masturbation Station | Nominated | |
| 2020 | AVN | Best Transgender Group Sex Scene | Menage a Trans 4 | Nominated | |
| 2020 | AVN | Best Transgender Group Sex Scene | Chanel Santini: TS Superstar | Won | |
| 2020 | Grabbys | Performer of the Year | N/A | Won | |
| 2020 | Grabbys | Hottest Flip | Scared Stiff 2 | Nominated | |
| 2020 | Grabbys | Best 3 Way | Scared Stiff 2 | Nominated | |
| 2020 | Grabbys | Best Group | Night Riders | Nominated | |
| 2020 | Grabbys | Best Actor | Dantes New Job | Nominated | |
| 2020 | Grabbys | Best Actor | Scared Stiff 2 | Nominated | |
