= Surf City =

Surf City may refer to:

== Music ==
- "Surf City" (song), written by Brian Wilson of the Beach Boys, and Jan Berry of Jan and Dean
- Surf City (band), New Zealand band

== Trademarks ==
- "Surf City USA", a registered trademark that was once at the center of a dispute between two California cities

== Places ==
- Huntington Beach, California, legally trademarked as Surf City USA
- Surf City, New Jersey
- Surf City, North Carolina
- Santa Cruz, California, colloquially referred to as Surf City
