= Coit D. Blacker =

American politician

Coit Dennis Blacker is the Olivier Nomellini Professor in International Studies in the School of Humanities and Sciences at Stanford University. He served as Special Assistant to the President of the United States for National Security Affairs and Senior Director for Russian, Ukrainian and Eurasian Affairs at the National Security Council under National Security Advisor Anthony Lake during the Clinton administration. From 2003 to 2012, he was the director of the Freeman Spogli Institute for International Studies at Stanford University and is a current Study Group Member of the National Commission on Terrorism.
