= Rebecca Couch =

American painter (1788–1863)

- Born: June 19, 1788; Redding, Connecticut
- Died: September 4, 1863 (aged 75)
- Known for: Painting
- Spouse: James C. Denison (m. 1794)

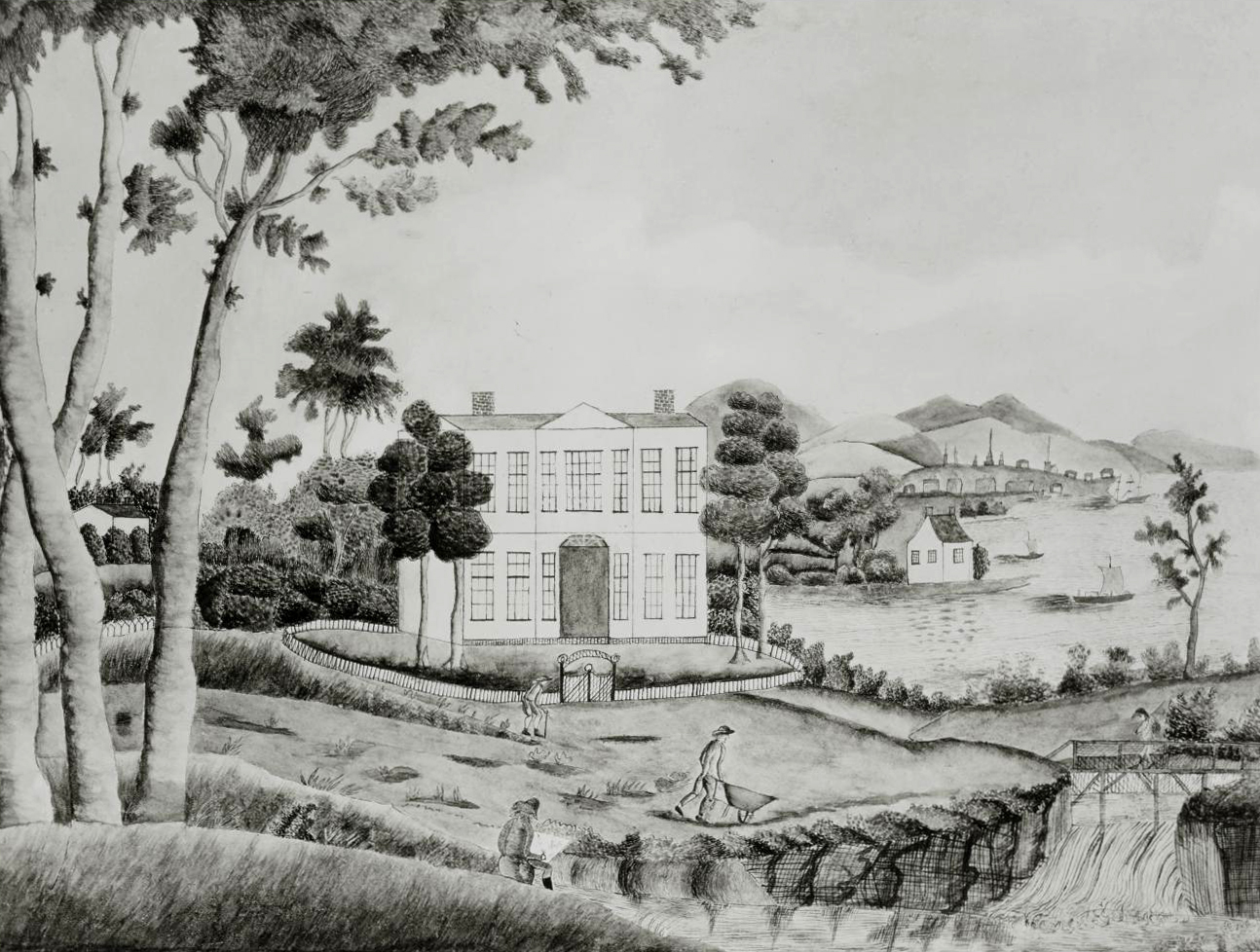
Connecticut House, ca. 1800. Watercolor and ink on wove paper, 13 x 16 in., Abby Aldrich Rockefeller Folk Art Center, Williamsburg

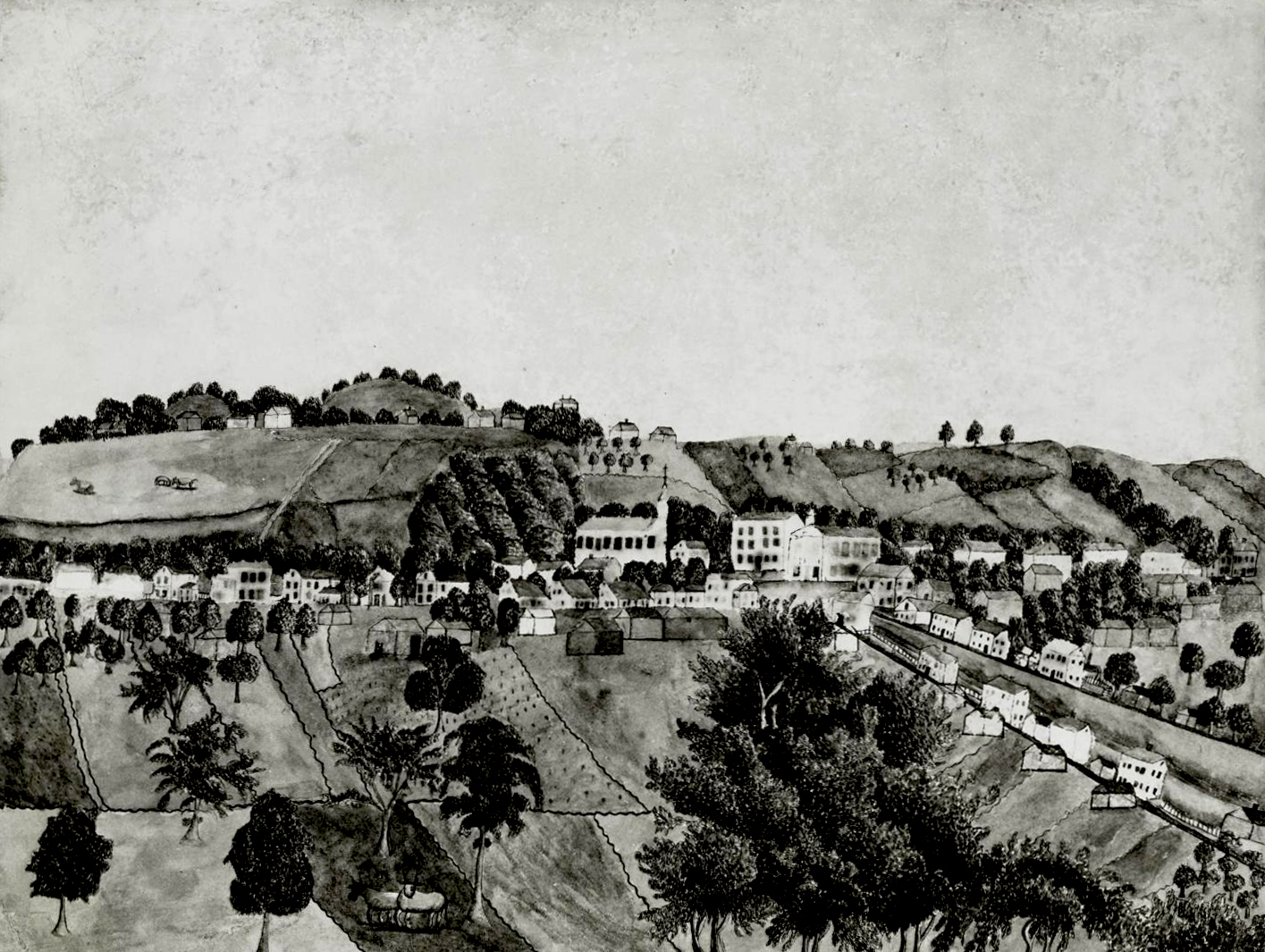
View of Litchfield, undated. Watercolor and ink on wove paper, Abby Aldrich Rockefeller Folk Art Center, Williamsburg

Rebecca Couch (June 19, 1788 – September 4, 1863) was an American painter.

Couch was born in Redding, Connecticut, the eldest daughter of Thomas Nash Couch and Abigail Stebbins Couch. She could have received training in watercolor technique, the medium for which she is most well known, in school.

She married James C. Denison on October 17, 1794, and the couple moved to Lansingburgh, New York, where they lived until the 1820s. They had seven children. At an unknown date, the family relocated to Couch's hometown.

Two of Couch's paintings, executed in watercolor and ink, are in the collection of the Abby Aldrich Rockefeller Folk Art Museum, Williamsburg, Virginia. One of these works had been acquired from the collection of J. Stuart Halladay and Herrel George Thomas. According to the museum's catalog, a needlework picture on silk that she completed at age fifteen is the only other work by her that had been documented by 1988.
