= Coach =

Coach may refer to:

== Guidance/instruction ==
- Coach (sport), a director of athletes' training and activities
- Coaching, the practice of guiding an individual through a process
  - Acting coach, a teacher who trains performers

== Transportation ==
- Coach (bus), an automotive vehicle for long-distance travel
- Coach (carriage), a horse-drawn vehicle
- Coach (passenger car), a type of railroad car
- Coach (scheduled transport), the mode of transport using such vehicles
  - Coach Canada, a Canadian bus transport company
  - Coach USA, an American bus transport company
- Coach class, a category of transport seating
- Ehroflug Coach II S, a Swiss ultralight aircraft design
- Funeral coach, a vehicle for carrying the deceased

== Business ==
- Coach, Inc. (now Tapestry, Inc.), the parent company of Coach New York and other fashion brands
  - Coach New York (aka Coach), an American company specializing in accessories such as handbags

== Art, media, and entertainment ==
=== Characters ===
- Coach (comics), a Marvel Comics character
- Coach Ernie Pantusso, a Cheers character
- Coach, a Left 4 Dead 2 character
- Coach Harris, a character in the 1984 American teen sex comedy movie Revenge of the Nerds
- Coach (New Girl), a character from the sitcom New Girl.

=== Film ===
- Coach (1978 film), starring Cathy Lee Crosby
- Coach (2018 film), a Russian sports film directed by Danilan Kozlovsky

=== Television ===
- Coach (TV series), an American television sitcom, 1989–1997
- "The Coach" (The Amazing World of Gumball), a television episode

== People ==
- Jonathan Coachman (born 1972), American professional wrestling personality known as "The Coach"
- Coach, alias of American professional wrestler John Tolos during a short 1991 stint as a WWF manager
- Benjamin "Coach" Wade (born 1971), a Survivor contestant

== Other uses ==
- Zoran COACH, a line of digital cameras from Zoran Corporation
- The Coach (horse)

== See also ==
- Bus (disambiguation)
- Coachbuilder
- Horse-drawn omnibus (coach)
- Ronny Coaches (fl. 1998–2013), Ghanaian musician
- Stagecoach
