= Names for soft drinks in the United States =

Names for soft drinks in the United States vary regionally. Soda and pop are the most common terms for soft drinks nationally, although other terms are used, such as, in the South, coke (a genericized name for Coca-Cola, not to be confused with cocaine). Since individual names tend to dominate regionally, the use of a particular term can be an act of geographic identity. The choice of terminology is most closely associated with geographic origin, rather than other factors such as race, age, or income. The differences in naming have been the subject of scholarly studies. Cambridge linguist Bert Vaux, in particular, has studied the "pop vs. soda debate" in conjunction with other regional vocabularies of American English.

== History ==
According to writer Andrew Schloss, "soda" derives from sodium, a common mineral in natural springs, and was first used to describe carbonation in 1802.

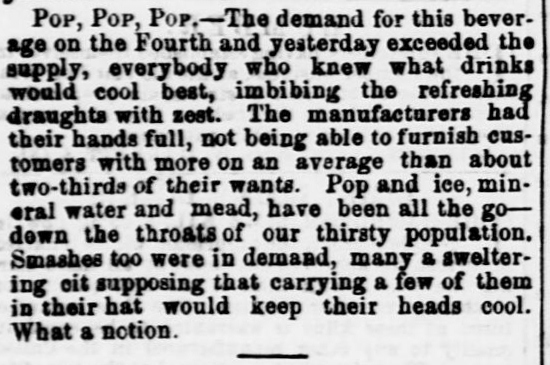
Short article from the Washington Daily Star, District of Columbia, published on July 6, 1854, using the word "pop" to describe a beverage

The earliest known usage of "pop" is from 1812; in a letter to his wife, poet Robert Southey says the drink is "called pop because pop goes the cork when it is drawn, & pop you would go off too if you drank too much of it." The two words were later combined into "soda pop" in 1863. Schloss gives the following years as the first attestations of the various terms for these beverages:

Year	Term
1798	Soda water
1809	Ginger pop
1812	Pop
1863	Soda pop
1880	Soft drink
1909	Coke
1920	Cola

== Soda ==
"Soda" is most common in the northeastern states, California, Nevada, Arizona, as well as Hawaii and a wide enclave or pocket around the Midwestern cities of St. Louis, Missouri, and Milwaukee, Wisconsin. To a lesser extent soda is also fairly common further down the east coast in eastern Virginia, eastern Carolinas and coastal Florida. Here, soda is not too dominant but competes with multiple other terms such as "coke". Unlike other regions, the coastal south-east has a relatively higher degree of variance between local individuals in terms of what they prefer to designate their soft drink.

The sharper "soda/pop" divide line runs through western Pennsylvania and western New York, approximately through the Rochester area. Those west of the line (e.g., in Pittsburgh and Buffalo) say "pop" while those east of the line (e.g. Syracuse) use "soda".

== Pop ==
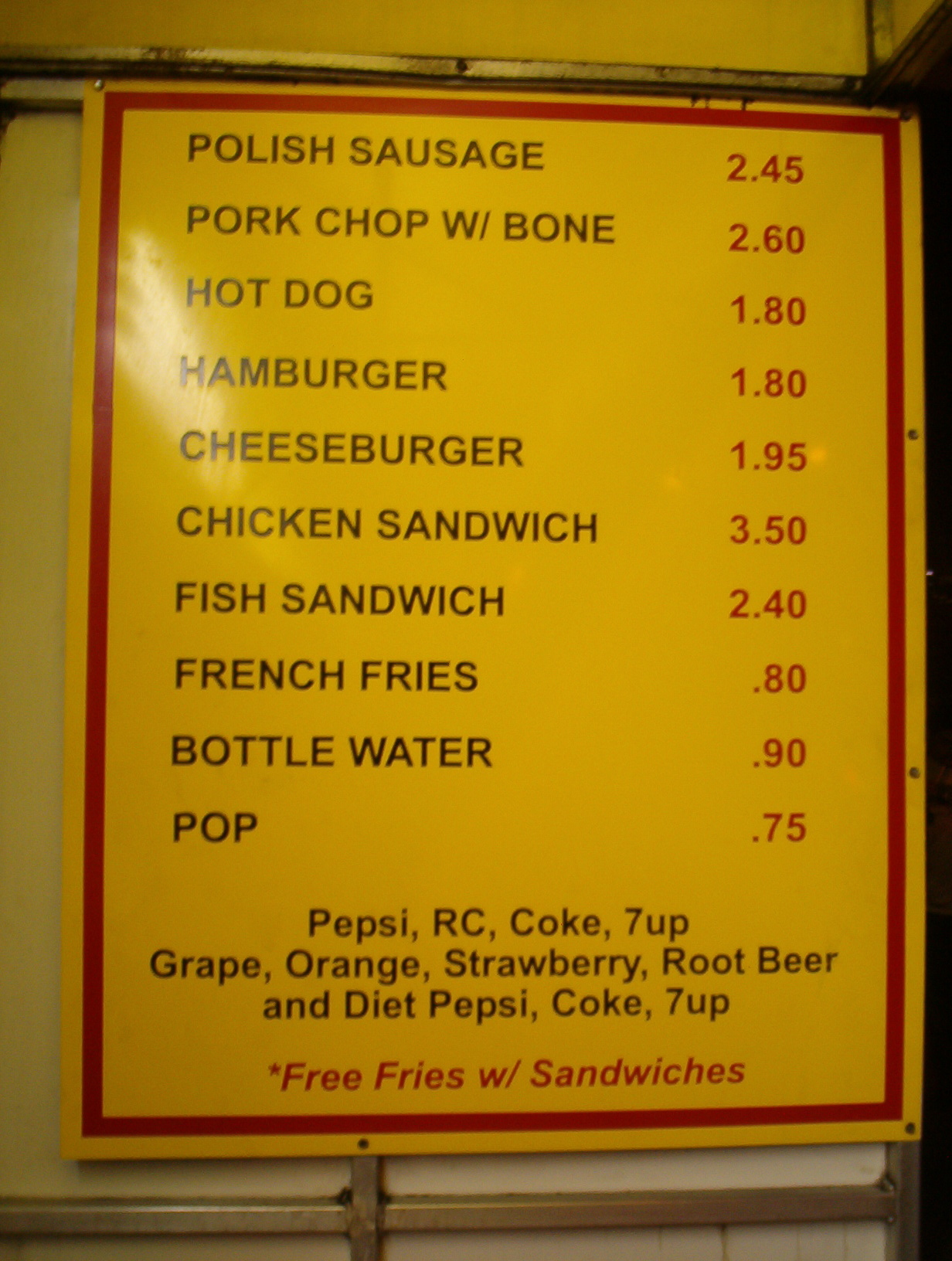
Price list at Chicago's Express Grill, showing the word "pop" at the bottom

"Pop" is most commonly associated with the Midwest and in most of the West, including the Mountain West and the Pacific Northwest. These include Illinois, Ohio, Minnesota, Michigan, Kansas, Oklahoma, Indiana, Iowa, Colorado, Oregon, Idaho, Washington and Alaska.

== Coke ==
In the Southern United States, "coke" is used as a generic term for any type of soft drink—not just a Coca-Cola product or another cola. This terminology is also used in areas adjacent to the traditional southern states such as Southern Indiana and New Mexico. Several other locations have been found to use the generic "coke", such as Trinity County, California and White Pine County, Nevada, although the small populations of these counties may skew survey results. A Twitter data scientist, however, found that while "soda" and "pop" dominate in the United States, the word "coke" (incl. "coca" or "cola") is by far the most common in other countries, including English-speaking ones.

== Other names ==
- "Tonic" has been used in eastern Massachusetts and parts of Maine and New Hampshire since at least 1888. Its usage has been gradually declining in favor of "soda". In some areas, "tonic" is still understood to mean "soft drink", but many regard it as an antiquated term.
- "Soda pop" is used by some speakers, especially in the Mountain West. "Soda" or "drinks" is common in Idaho and Utah.
- "Drink", "cold drink", "carbo", and "soda" are locally common in southern Virginia and the Carolinas, spreading from there as far as Louisiana.
- "Soda water" or “sodiewater” is occasionally used in some rural parts of Arkansas, Oklahoma, and Texas.
- "Soft drink", "cold drink", or "fountain drink" is the phrase of choice in New Orleans and most of east Texas as far west as the Dallas–Fort Worth Metroplex (although in the DFW Metroplex itself the usage is somewhat colloquial). It is also commonly used along with "soda" and/or "coke" in Eastern North Carolina.
- "Refresco" is the term used in American Spanish, which literally translates to "Refreshment".

== See also ==
- List of soft drinks by country#United States
