= Surfers Paradise (disambiguation) =

Surfers Paradise is a beach resort town on the Gold Coast in Queensland, Australia

Surfers Paradise may also refer to:

- Electoral district of Surfers Paradise, district in the Legislative Assembly of Queensland, Australia
- Surfers Paradise Street Circuit, a temporary street circuit
- Surfers Paradise (horse), who won the 1991 Cox Plate in Australia
- Surfers Paradise (album), a 2013 studio album by Cody Simpson
