= Surfer Dude =

Surfer Dude may refer to:

- Antony Garrett Lisi (born 1968), whom in late 2007 the media referred to as a "Surfer Dude"
- Surfer, Dude, a 2008 comedy film
- A male surfer
