= Silver Surfer (disambiguation) =

Silver Surfer is a comic book character.

Silver Surfer may also refer to:

- Silver Surfer (comic book), a number of eponymous series from Marvel Comics
- Silver Surfer (TV series), a 1998 television series based on the character
- Silver Surfer (video game), a 1990 Nintendo Entertainment System video game based on the character
- Silver surfer (internet user), a term commonly used for an older Internet user
