= Koch Institute =

The Koch Institute refers to several different institutions:

- David H. Koch Institute for Integrative Cancer Research, a cancer research institution located in Cambridge, Massachusetts
- Charles Koch Institute, a libertarian policy think tank based in Virginia
- Robert Koch Institute, a disease control and prevention institute headquartered in Berlin, Germany
