= The Couch =

The Couch may refer to:

- The Couch (Seinfeld), an episode of NBC sitcom Seinfeld
- The Couch (film), a 1962 American psychological horror film
- "The Couch", a song by Alanis Morissette from Supposed Former Infatuation Junkie
- "The Couch", a song by Baron Longfellow
