= Surfing (disambiguation) =

Surfing is a surface water sport in which the rider, referred to as a surfer, rides on the forward or deep face of a moving wave.

Surfing may also refer to:

== Activities ==
- Web surfing, navigating the World Wide Web

== Music ==
- "Surfin'", a song by the Beach Boys
- "Surfin'" (Kid Cudi song), 2016
- "Surfing", song by Mike Oldfield, from Light + Shade
- Surfing, album by Megapuss

== Other uses ==
- "Surfing", an episode from Peppa Pig
- Surfing, another term for Edging (sexual practice)

== See also ==
- Bodyboarding, water sport using a bodyboard
- Bodysurfing, riding a wave without the assistance of any buoyant device
- Kitesurfing, propulsion with a power kite across a surface
- Windsurfing, water sport combining surfing and sailing
- Horse surfing, the act of surfing while being towed behind a horse
- Channel surfing, quickly scanning through television channels
- Crowd surfing, passing a person atop a crowd
- Couch surfing, temporarily staying in another's home
- Shoulder surfing (computer security), social engineering technique
- Surf (disambiguation)
- Surfer (disambiguation)
