= Settee (disambiguation) =

A settee is a cushioned piece of furniture for seating several people.

Settee may also refer to:

== People ==
- George Settee, a member of the 1880s Nile Expedition to relieve Gordon, from the Peguis First Nation
- James Settee (1809-1902) a Swampy Cree ordained Anglican priest
- Priscilla Settee, a Cree activist in Canada
- Headmaster Settee (19th century), the second headmaster of the Gordon's Indian Residential School

== Other uses ==
- Knole Settee, the sofa chair which was used as a throne in Knole, Kent, England, UK
- Radio Settee (album), a 1998 companion record by You Am I released along with the album #4 Record
- Settee (sail), a quadrilateral-shaped lateen sail
- settee, that which is set by the setter

== See also ==
- Couch (disambiguation)
- Sofa (disambiguation)
- Satay (disambiguation)
- Setter (disambiguation)
- Sette (disambiguation)
- Sett (disambiguation)
- Sete (disambiguation)
- Seti (disambiguation)
