= Satay (disambiguation) =

Satay (aka sate) is a Southeast Asian dish of seasoned, skewered and grilled meat, served with a sauce.

Satay may also refer to:

- Satay sauce, a sauce
- Satay Club, Singapore; an open-air hawker centre
- Wahid Satay (born 1930) Malaysian-Singaporean actor

== See also ==
- Settee (disambiguation)
- Sette (disambiguation)
- Sete (disambiguation)
- Seti (disambiguation)
- Sati (disambiguation)
