= Statue of Jorge Matute Remus =

Statue of Jorge Matute Remus may refer to:

- Statue of Jorge Matute Remus (Centro, Guadalajara), Jalisco, Mexico
- Statue of Jorge Matute Remus (Rotonda de los Jaliscienses Ilustres), Centro, Guadalajara, Jalisco, Mexico
