= Seth (comics) =

Seth, in comics, may refer to:

- Seth (Marvel Comics), a Marvel Comics villain based on the Egyptian god
- Seth, a Wildstorm character who appeared in the Authority storylines "Brave New World" and "Transfer Of Power"
- Seth, a character from the X-Men
- Seth Voder, a DC Comics character who appeared in Batman stories

It may also refer to a number of comic creators:

- Seth (cartoonist), a Canadian cartoonist known for works such as Palookaville
- Seth Fisher, a comic book artist known for his work at DC
- Seth Damoose, an American comic artist

== See also ==
- Seth (disambiguation)
- Set (Marvel Comics), a Conan character who had a wide role in the Marvel Comics adaptations
