= Plumber =

Tradesperson specializing in water and sewage systems

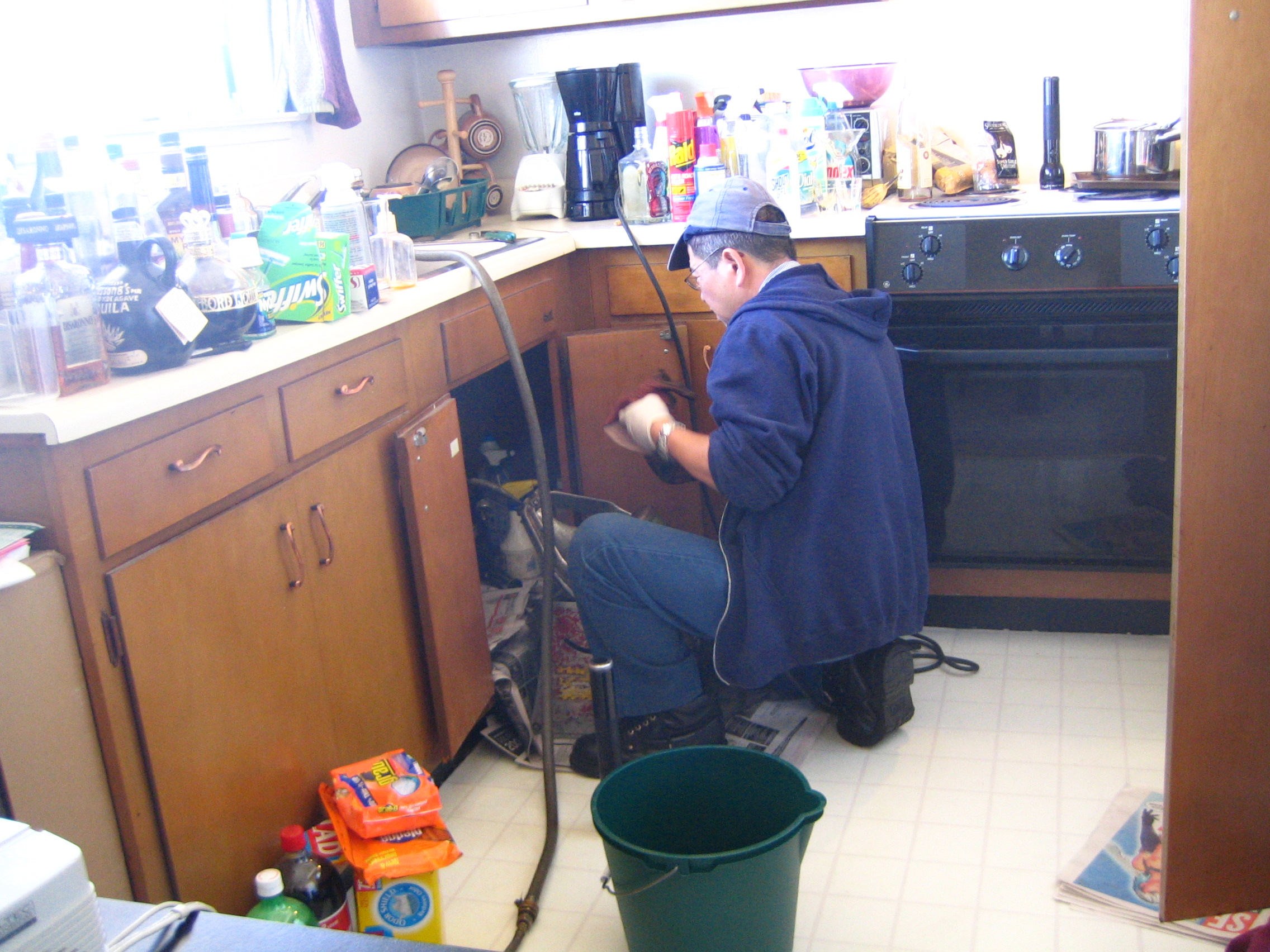
- Residential plumber at work

Occupation
- Occupation type: Vocational
- Activity sectors: Construction

Description
- Education required: Apprenticeship
- Related jobs: Carpenter, electrician

A plumber is a tradesperson who specializes in installing and maintaining systems used for potable (drinking) water, hot-water production, sewage and drainage in plumbing systems.

== History ==
The origin of the word "plumber" dates from the Roman Empire. Roman roofs used lead in conduits and drain pipes and some were also covered with lead; lead was also used for piping and for making baths. The Latin for lead is plumbum. In medieval times, anyone who worked with lead was referred to as a plumber; this can be seen from an extract about workmen fixing a roof in Westminster Palace; they were referred to as plumbers: "To Gilbert de Westminster, plumber, working about the roof of the pantry of the little hall, covering it with lead, and about various defects in the roof of the little hall".

== Plumbing activities ==
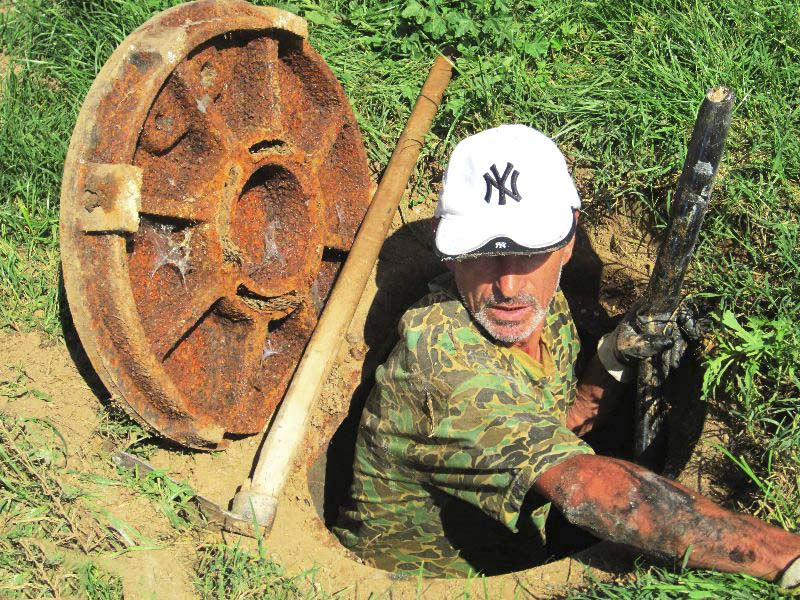
Plumber exiting a sewer via a manhole

Years of training and/or experience are needed to become a skilled plumber; some jurisdictions also require that plumbers be licensed.

Common plumbing tasks and skills include:

- Reading drawings and specifications, to determine the layout of water supply, waste, and venting systems
- Detecting faults in plumbing appliances and systems, and correctly diagnosing their causes
- Installing, repairing and maintaining domestic, commercial, and industrial plumbing fixtures and systems
- Locating and marking positions for pipe connections, passage holes, and fixtures in walls and floors
- Measuring, cutting, bending, and threading pipes using hand and power tools or machines
- Joining pipes and fittings together using soldering techniques, compression fittings, threaded fittings, solvent weld, crimp and push-fit fittings.
- Testing pipes for leaks using air or water pressure gauges
- Paying attention, in all work undertaken, to legal regulations and safety issues
- Ensuring that all safety standards and building regulations are met.

=== Australia ===
Plumbing work is defined in the Australian Standards (AS3500) Regulations 2013 and refers to any operation, work or process in connection with installation, removal, demolition, replacement, alteration, maintenance or repair to the system of pipes and fixtures that conveys clean water into and liquid waste out of a building.

To become a licensed plumber a four-year apprenticeship and a Certificate III in Plumbing is required. As part of this course, instruction in the basics of gas fitting will be undertaken. Upon completion, these basics in gas fitting will allow the plumber to not only apply for their plumbing license but also an interim gas license, and carry out gas work under the supervision of a fully qualified gas fitter.

To obtain a full gas license from the Department of Mines and Energy, the plumber will need to have worked on an interim gas license for a minimum period of twelve months and successfully completed a Certificate IV in Plumbing.

=== Canada ===
In Canada, licensing requirements differ by province; however, the provinces have pooled resources to develop an Interprovincial Program Guide that developed and now maintains apprenticeship training standards across all provinces. The Red Seal Program, formally known as the Interprovincial Standards Red Seal Program, is a program that sets common standards to assess the skills of tradespeople across Canada. The Red Seal, when affixed to a provincial or territorial trade certificate, indicates that a tradesperson has demonstrated the knowledge required for the national standard in that trade.

=== Colombia ===
Plumbing is not regulated in Colombia, so anyone can provide this service. Plumbers usually learn the trade because their families work in the construction industry, and they specialize in this field, but anyone can legally offer plumbing services. The most popular training institution for trades is SENA, a public school that provides high-quality education, though it is not mandatory.

=== Ireland ===
In Ireland, a four-year apprenticeship plus qualification exam was necessary for someone to practice professionally. Accreditation of businesses is of help in order to show their credibility and experience in the job.

=== United Kingdom ===
National Vocational Qualifications (NVQ) remained the main form of plumbing qualification until they were superseded in 2008 by the Qualification and Credit Framework (QCF) and then again, in 2015, into the National qualifications frameworks in the United Kingdom. The terms NVQ and SVQ (Scottish Vocational Qualification) are still widely used.

Plumbers in the United Kingdom are required to pass Level 2 and Level 3 vocational requirements of the City and Guilds of London Institute. There are several regulatory bodies in the United Kingdom providing accredited plumbing qualifications, including City and Guilds of London Institute and Pearson PLC.

=== United States ===
Apprenticeship offices in the United States

Each state and locality may have its own licensing and taxing schemes for plumbers. Some states license journeymen and master plumbers separately, while others license only master plumbers. To become licensed, plumbers must meet standards for training and experience, and in most cases, pass a certification exam. There is no federal law establishing licenses for plumbers.

== Dangers ==
There are many types of dangers to a plumber. These include electric shock, strains and sprains, cuts and lacerations, bruises and contusions, fractures, burns and scalds, foreign bodies in the eye, and hernias. Working at height or in confined spaces, or working with lead and asbestos are all on-site dangers that plumbers can face.

=== Infectious disease risks ===
Plumbers risk infections when dealing with human waste while repairing sewage systems. Microbes can be excreted in the faecal matter or vomit of the sufferer onto the toilet or sewage pipes. Human waste can contain infectious diseases such as cholera, typhoid, hepatitis, polio, cryptosporidiosis, ascariasis, and schistosomiasis.

== Other uses ==
The term "White House Plumbers" was a popular name given to the covert White House Special Investigations Unit established on July 24, 1971, during the presidency of Richard Nixon. Their job was to plug intelligence "leaks" in the U.S. Government relating to the Vietnam War (i.e. the Pentagon Papers); hence the term "plumbers".

== See also ==
- List of tools and equipment for plumbers
- Pipefitter
- Piping
