= Set =

Set, The Set, SET or SETS may refer to:

== Science, technology, and mathematics ==
=== Mathematics ===
- Set (mathematics), a collection of elements
- Category of sets, the category whose objects and morphisms are sets and total functions, respectively

=== Electronics and computing ===
- Set (abstract data type), a data type in computer science that is a collection of distinct values
  - Set (C++), a set implementation in the C++ Standard Library
- Set (command), a command for setting values of environment variables in Unix and Microsoft operating-systems
- Secure Electronic Transaction, a standard protocol for securing credit card transactions over insecure networks
- Single-electron transistor, a device to amplify currents in nanoelectronics
- Single-ended triode, a type of electronic amplifier
- Set!, a programming syntax in the scheme programming language

=== Biology and psychology ===
- Set (psychology), a set of expectations which shapes perception or thought
- Set or sett, a badger's den
- Set, a small tuber or bulb used instead of seed, especially:
  - Potato set
  - Onion set
- SET (gene), gene for a human protein involved in apoptosis, transcription and nucleosome assembly
- Single Embryo Transfer, used in in vitro fertilization

=== Physics and chemistry ===
- A chemical change in an adhesive from unbonded to bonded
  - Set, to make/become solid; see Solidification
- Stress–energy tensor, a physical quantity in the theory of fields
- Single electron transfer

=== Other uses in science and technology ===
- Saw set, the process of setting the teeth of a saw so each tooth protrudes to the side of the blade
- Scalar expectancy theory, a model of the processes that govern behavior controlled by time
- Science, Engineering & Technology, e.g. The Science, Engineering & Technology Student of the Year Awards
- Setting (typesetting), the act of typesetting a publication for print or display
- Simulated Emergency Test, an amateur radio training exercise
- Software Engineer in Test, a quality assurance job title in some software companies
- Strategic Energy Technologies Plan of the European Union
- Suzuki SET, Suzuki Exhaust Tuning of motorcycles
- Set Catena, a pit chain on Neptune's largest moon Triton

== Arts and entertainment ==
=== Comics and literature ===
- Set (comics), the chief deity of the Stygian people in Robert E. Howard's stories of Conan the Barbarian and the later Marvel comics series

=== Dance ===
- Set, the basic square formation in square dancing
- Set, the basic longwise, square or triangular formation in Scottish Country dancing
- Set, the basic formation of more than one couple in Scottish, English and Irish Céilidh

=== Film, television and theatre ===
- Set (film and TV scenery)
- Theatrical scenery
- Set construction, construction of scenery for theatrical, movie, television production, and video game production
- The Set (film), a 1970 Australian movie
- The Set (TV series), an Australian music television show
- Sanlih Entertainment Television, a television channel in Taiwan
- Sony Entertainment Television, a Hindi-language television channel

=== Music ===
- DJ set or DJ mix, a musical performance by a DJ
- Set theory (music), dealing with concepts for categorizing musical objects and describing their relationships
- Set (music), a collection of discrete entities, for example pitch sets, duration sets, and timbre sets
- Set (Thompson Twins album)
- Set (Alex Chilton album)
- Set list, a list of songs to be played during musical performances
- "Set", a song from King Gizzard & the Lizard Wizard's 2023 album The Silver Cord

== Businesses and organizations ==
- Societatea Pentru Exploatări Tehnice, a Romanian aeronautics company of the 1920s to 1940s
- South Eastern Trains, former train operator England
- Stock Exchange of Thailand, the national stock exchange of Thailand
- SET Index, an index for the Stock Exchange of Thailand
- SET (arts organisation), a London-based arts organisation and charity
- South Eastern Trust, Northern Irish health organization
- Study of Exceptional Talent, a program for gifted students
- Sydney Electric Train Society, an electric train preservation society in Sydney, Australia

== Religion ==
- Set (deity) or Seth, an ancient Egyptian deity
- Set or Seth, a Biblical character, a son of Adam and Eve

== Sport and games ==
- Set (darts), a sequence of games
- Set (card game), a pattern-finding race
- Set (cards), two or more cards of the same rank
  - Three of a kind (poker), a type of poker hand
- Set (dominoes), the first play in dominoes
- Set, a signal used in American football
- The set, a pitching position in baseball
- Set, a unit of play in tennis
- Set, a team's second contact with the ball in volleyball
- Set, a group of repetitions in weight training
- Set (video game), a group of items that adds specific bonuses

== Other uses ==
- Set and setting, coined by Timothy Leary to describe the mindset and location of hallucinogenic experiences
- Seṭ and aniṭ roots, in Sanskrit grammar
- Set (river), a river in northeastern Spain
- Selective Employment Tax, a tax in the United Kingdom from 1966 to 1973
- Senate Electoral Tribunal, decides election protests for the Senate of the Philippines
- A set, set meal, set menu, or table d'hôte: a meal offered at a fixed price
- Set (gang), a subgroup of a gang alliance

== See also ==
- Reset (disambiguation)
- Digital set (disambiguation)
- Seth (disambiguation)
- Seti (disambiguation)
- Sett (disambiguation)
- Sette (disambiguation)
- Setting (disambiguation)
- Setup (disambiguation)
