= CUCEI =

University Center of Exact Sciences and Engineering
- Centro Universitario de Ciencias Exactas e Ingenierías
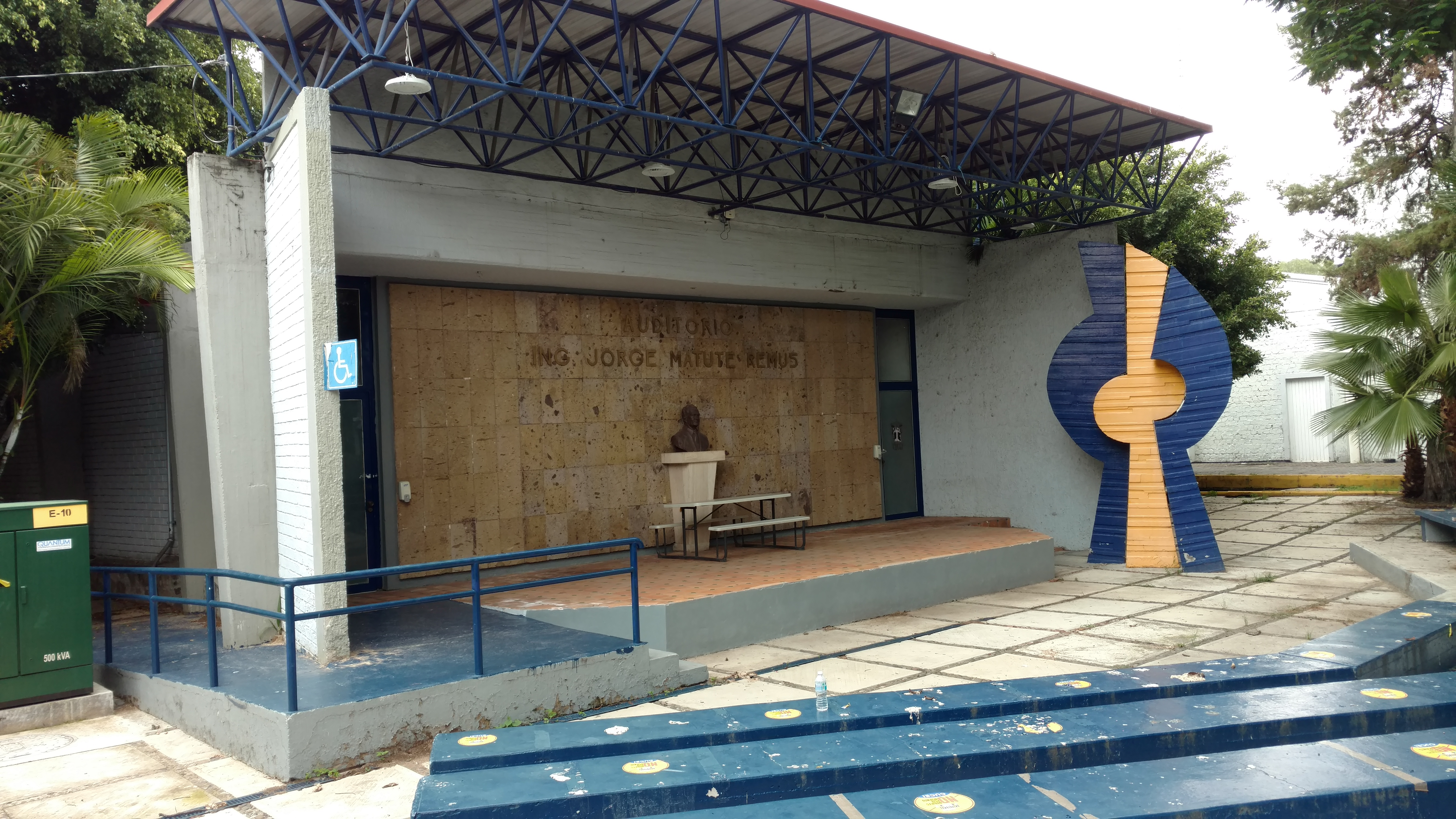
- Entrance to the Jorge Matute Remus Auditorium
- Former name: Institute of Sciences of the State (Instituto de Ciencias del Estado)
- Type: Public university
- Established: May 2, 1994
- Rector: Dr. Marco Antonio Pérez Cisneros
- Undergraduates: 14,289 (February, 2018)
- Postgraduates: 292 (February, 2018)
- Location: Blvd. Marcelino García Barragán 1421, Guadalajara, Jalisco, 44430, Mexico; 20°39′25.0″N 103°19′31.2″W
- Language: Mexican Spanish
- Website: www.cucei.udg.mx

The University Center of Exact Sciences and Engineering (CUCEI) is the entity from the University of Guadalajara in Mexico which focuses in the fields of engineering, physical sciences, chemistry and mathematics. The CUCEI currently serves 14,581 students in 18 undergraduate and 18 postgraduate programs. It also has 216 researchers of the National System of Researchers (SNI) and 380 professors with recognition from the Teacher Professional Development Program (PRODEP).

== History ==
The Institute of Sciences of the State of Jalisco was inaugurated on February 14, 1827, and offered majors in medical science and surgery, jurisprudence, physical sciences and mathematics.

When the conservative party came into power, the lawyer José Antonio Romero closed the institute at the same time as he reopened the university by an official decree on September 1, 1834.

In 1847. the lawyer Joaquín Angulo, as state governor, determined the simultaneous existence of both the institute and the university, now under a liberal teaching basis. In 1853, it was decreed that the institute would become part of the university.

On September 7, 1925, the foundations of the Polytechnic School, the Faculty of Engineering and the Faculty of Pharmacy, first dependencies that precede the university center, are established.

When the university was definitively founded, on October 12, 1925, the alternation between it and the Institute of Sciences ended, as a result of the disputes caused by the differences in the political lines of the conservative and liberal governments. At the time it was formed by the Faculty of Medicine, Faculty of Engineering and Polytechnic, Faculty of Jurisprudence, Faculty of Pharmacy, Faculty of Commerce, Preparatory School of Jalisco, Preparatory School for Ladies and the Normal School of Jalisco.

In 1937, the university was reorganized by Constancio Hernández Alvirde, issuing the Organic Law of the University of Guadalajara, which by that date already had, in the field of exact sciences and engineering, the Polytechnic School, the Faculty of Physical and Mathematical Sciences and the Faculty of Chemical Sciences, and the Astronomical and Meteorological Institute.

The idea of forming a Technological Institute was conceived by the engineer Jorge Matute Remus, along with a project to build a College town, this project began during the government period of General García Barragán (1943-1947), who approved the donation of the land, and on August 21, 1947, at the meeting of the University Council, its creation was approved.

On September 19, 1949, engineer Jorge Matute Remus inaugurated the activities at the Technological Institute of Guadalajara. From this date they make up the Technological Institute, the Faculties of Chemical Sciences and Engineering and the Architecture, Vocational, Pre-vocational and Polytechnic schools.

In 1980, the Faculty of Sciences was created, offering courses in Biology, Physics and Mathematics, the last two still being offered on the campus.

The General University Council in extraordinary session on August 5, 1994, approves the creation of the University Network in the State of Jalisco. This network is made up of Thematic Centers, Regional Centers, the High School Education System and the General Administration of the university. Thus, on May 2, 1994, the General University Council approved the creation of the CUCEI.

== Academic Offer ==
=== Technicians ===
- High University Technician in Plastic Injection
- High University Technician in Electronics
- High University Technician in Computer Networks
- High University Technician in Information Science
- High University Technician in Quality Systems

=== Undergraduate programs ===
- Physics
- Mathematics
- Chemistry
- Chemical Pharmacobiology
- Materials Science
- Civil Engineering
- Food and Biotechnology Engineering
- Topographic Engineering
- Industrial Engineering
- Mechanical and Electrical Engineering
- Chemical Engineering
- Informatics Engineering
- Biomedical Engineering
- Computing Engineering
- Communications and Electronics Engineering
- Robotics Engineering
- Photonic Engineering
- Transport and Logistics Engineering

=== Graduate programs ===
==== Master's degrees ====
- MSc in Mathematics
- MSc in Electrical Engineering
- MSc in Physics
- MSc in Chemical Engineering
- MSc in Biotechnological Processes
- MSc in Hydrometeorology (specialization in oceanography and meteorology physics)
- MSc in Chemistry
- MSc in Forest Products
- MSc in Electronics and Computation Engineering
- MSc in Food Science

==== Doctorates ====
- PhD in Mathematical Sciences
- PhD in Physical Sciences
- PhD in Chemical Engineering Sciences
- PhD in Biotechnical Processes Sciences
- PhD in Chemistry
- PhD in Electronics and Computer Science

== Infrastructure ==
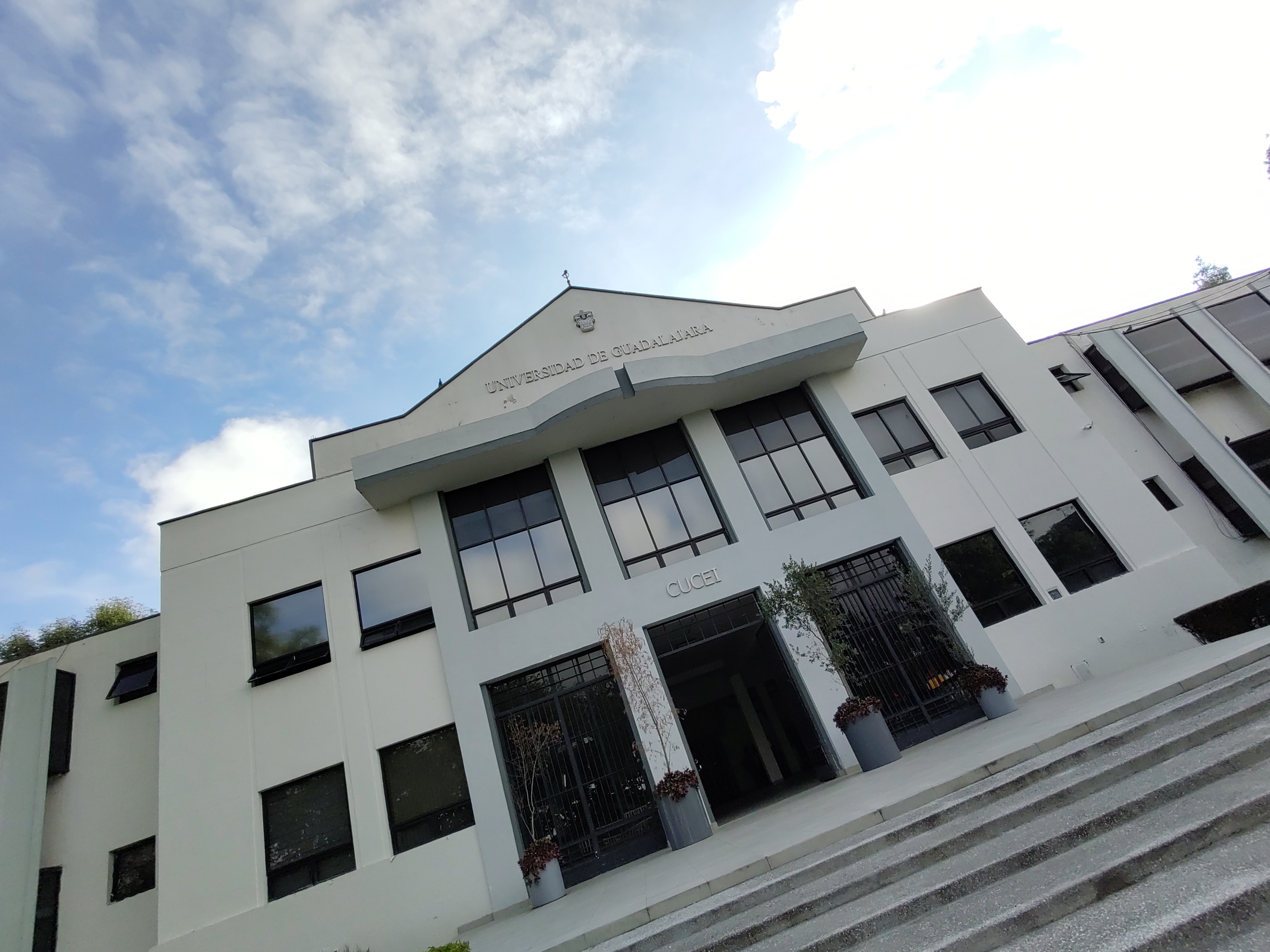
CUCEI rectory

The area that makes up the university complex covers about 7.8 hectares (19 acres) of extension, in which 22 buildings are erected consisting of 265 classrooms, 133 laboratories, 10 workshops, 4 auditoriums and 2 computer classroom buildings.

=== Integral Documentation Center (CID) ===
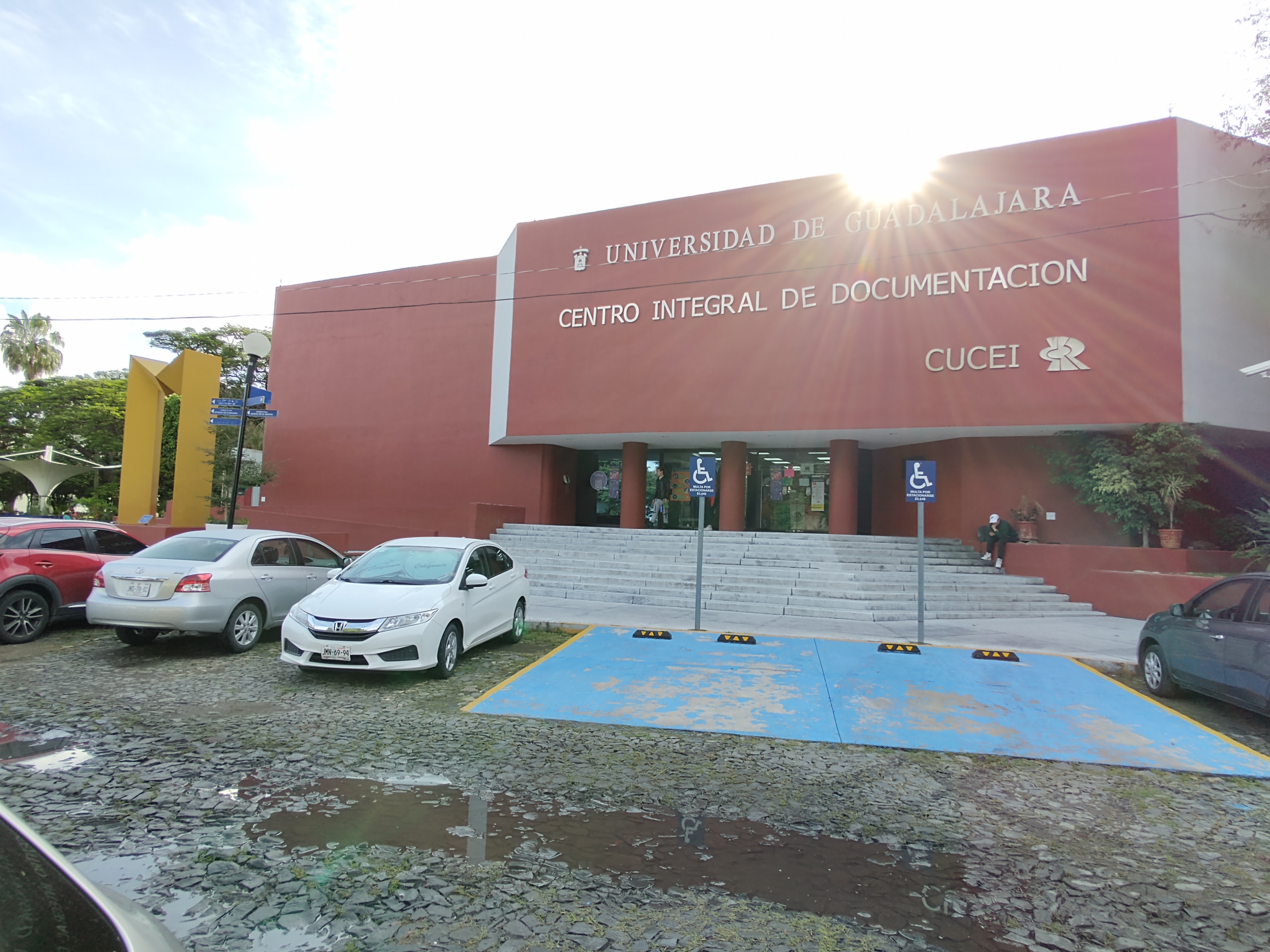
Integral Documentation Center facade

The library of this university center is known as the Integral Documentation Center (CID), it offers consultation of books on subjects such as electronics, computing, programming, computer science, physics, chemistry, mathematics, social sciences, literature, assisted drawing as well as technical and application books, in Spanish or English, in its multiple branches. Consultation of scientific journals, old books and newspapers is also offered. Internet access and study cubicles are available. Within the facilities there is also the Self-Access Center (Centro de Auto Acceso) where books such as dictionaries, language courses, as well as computer programs can be consulted to study independently and without any teaching of foreign languages, for example, Japanese, French, English, or German. Access to the material is free, but either a library card or a valid student card for the current semester are required. A library card can be obtained by taking a course on handling the library material.

The CID, thanks to the effort of the administration, the people who make it up and the volunteer staff, received the ISO 9001: 2000 certificate on April 7, 2004, which guarantees the quality of the library services offered by the CUCEI of the University of Guadalajara. In this way, it became the first library in Jalisco and one of the first five nationally to have this quality certificate. The activities to achieve this certificate began on September 7, 2003, and the external audit was carried out on March 9, 2004, a period in which they worked with planning, documentation and implementation. These works were the trigger for most of the libraries of the university network to jointly obtain the ISO 9001 certificate in 2007. Currently, the CID is certified in the ISO 9001:2015 standard.

=== Laboratories ===
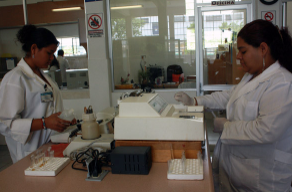
Linkage Clinical and Bacteriological Analysis Laboratory

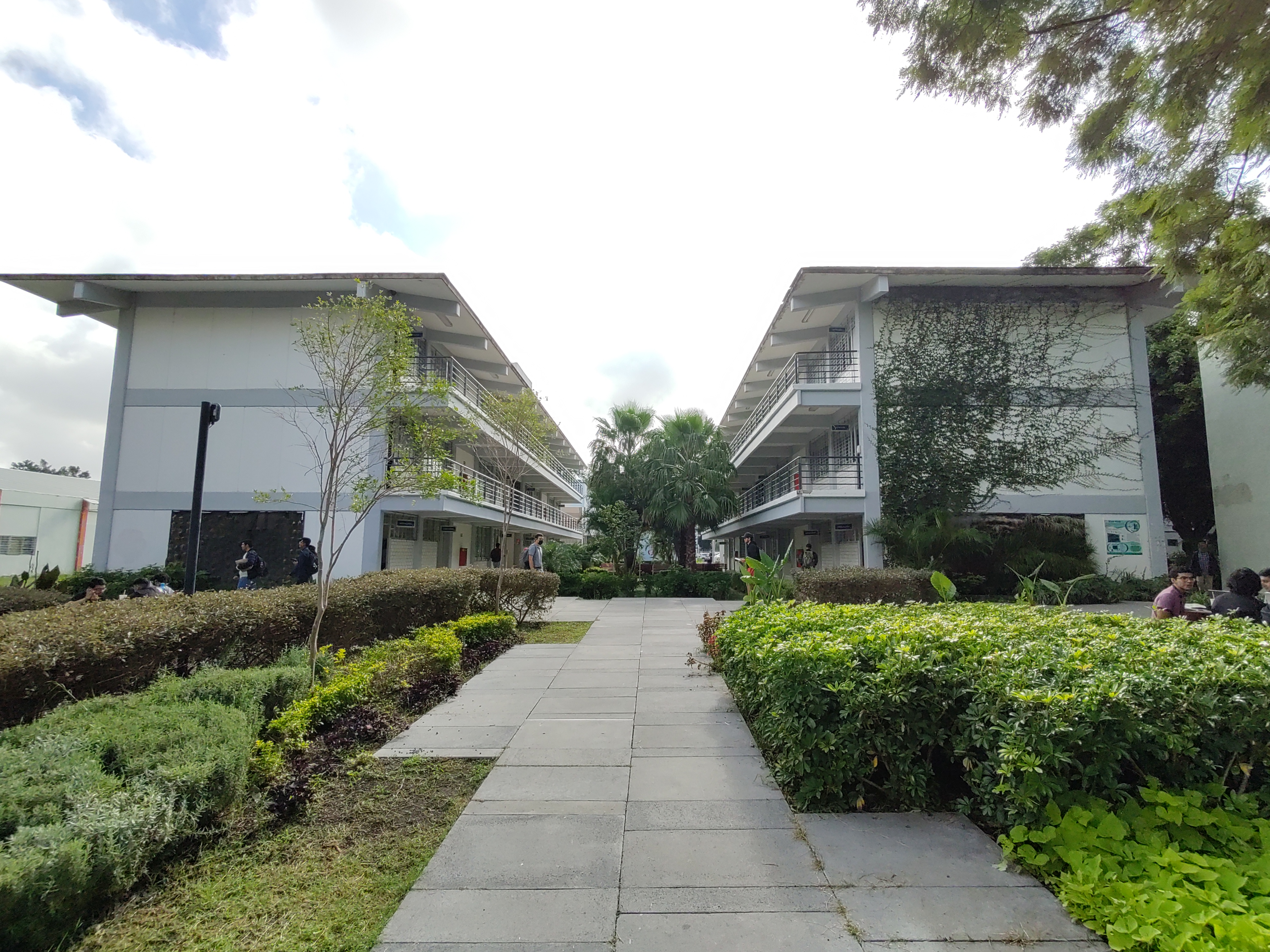
Alpha & Beta Computing Laboratories

Given the practical nature of the disciplines taught within the university center, laboratories play a central role in research. Below is a list of some of the most important laboratories considering the areas of research:

- Astrophysics
- Civil Engineering
- Biotechnology
- Software development
- Quantum physics
- Hydrometeorology and meteorology
- Food Engineering
- Nanotechnology
- Polymers
- Educational Processes in Mathematics
- Relativity and gravitation
- Robotics
- Pharmaceutical Technology

== Institute of Astronomy and Meteorology ==
When the University of Guadalajara was founded in its modern era in 1925, the State Astronomical, Meteorological and Seismological Observatory joined it as its first dependency dedicated essentially to scientific research, and although this was its main activity, what stands out in these 76 years of continuous work are its teaching and science communication activities.

== Student support portals ==
CUCEI has a internet radio station: RADIO CUCEI which has been in operation since July 14, 2011, with a variety of programs produced by students and members of the university community from both CUCEI and other university centers in the University of Guadalajara network. Thus, it serves as a means of disseminating relevant activities of the university center, such as events, exam programming, cultural and entertainment activities, among others.

== Gallery ==
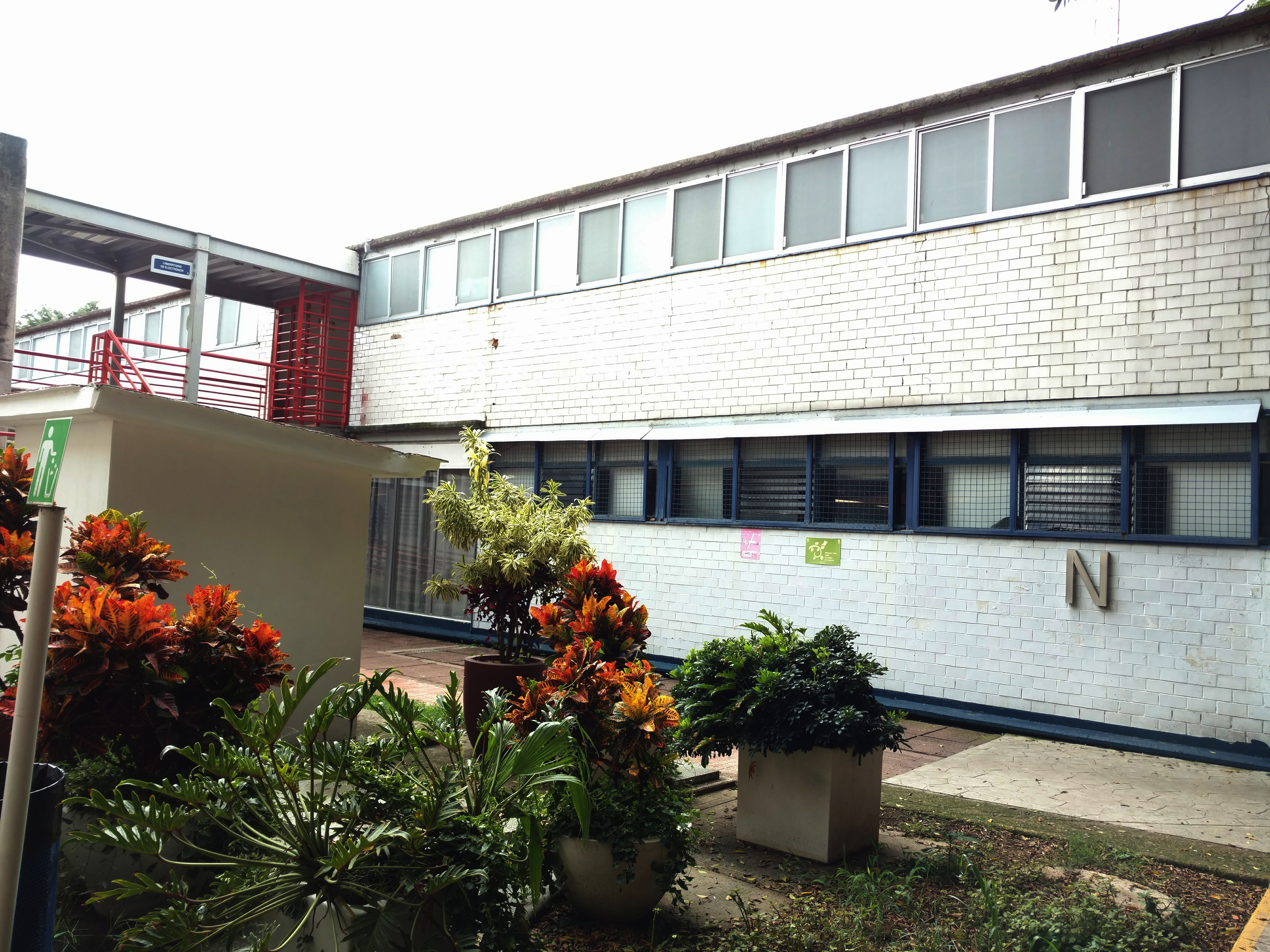
N building

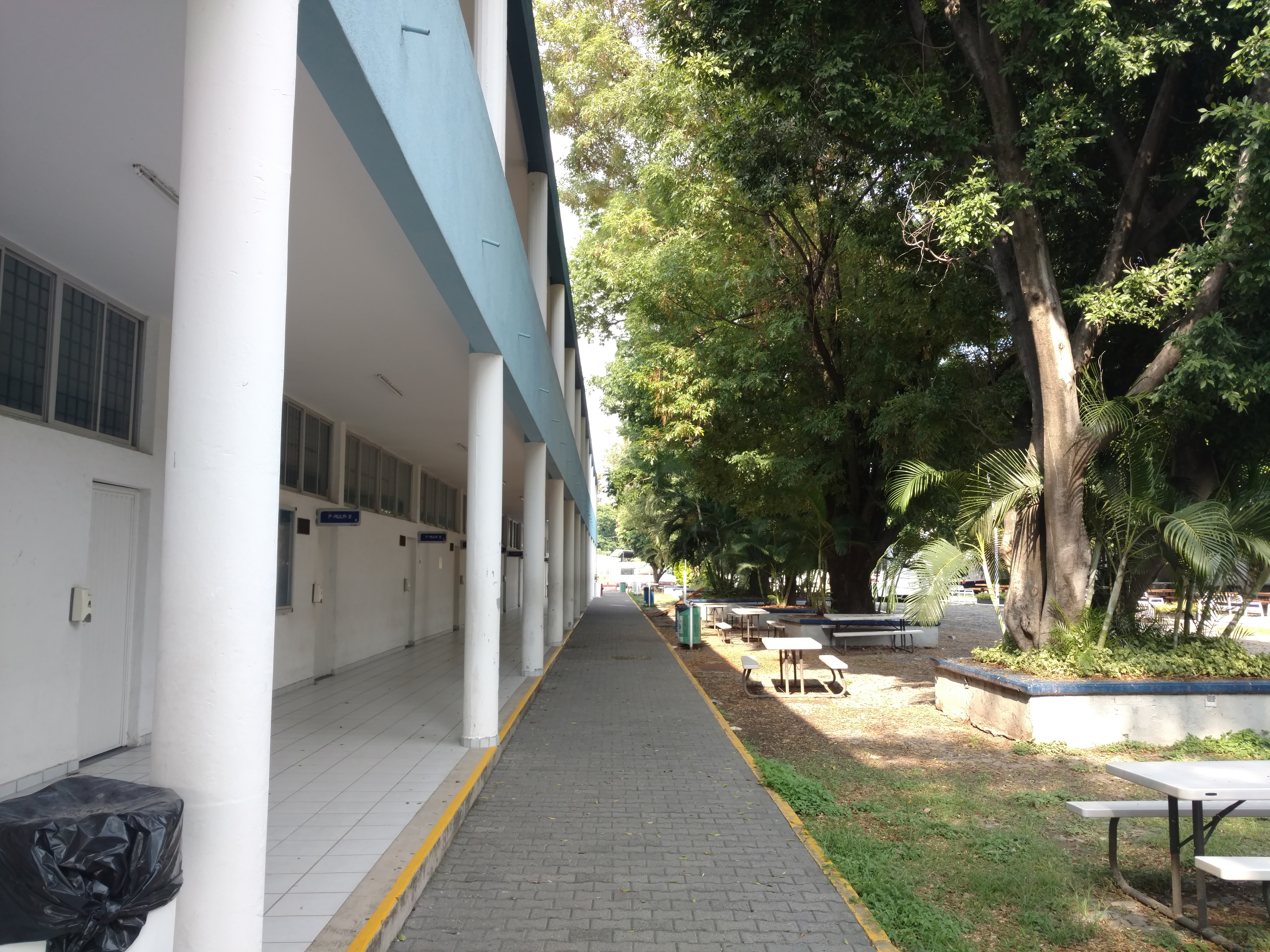
P building

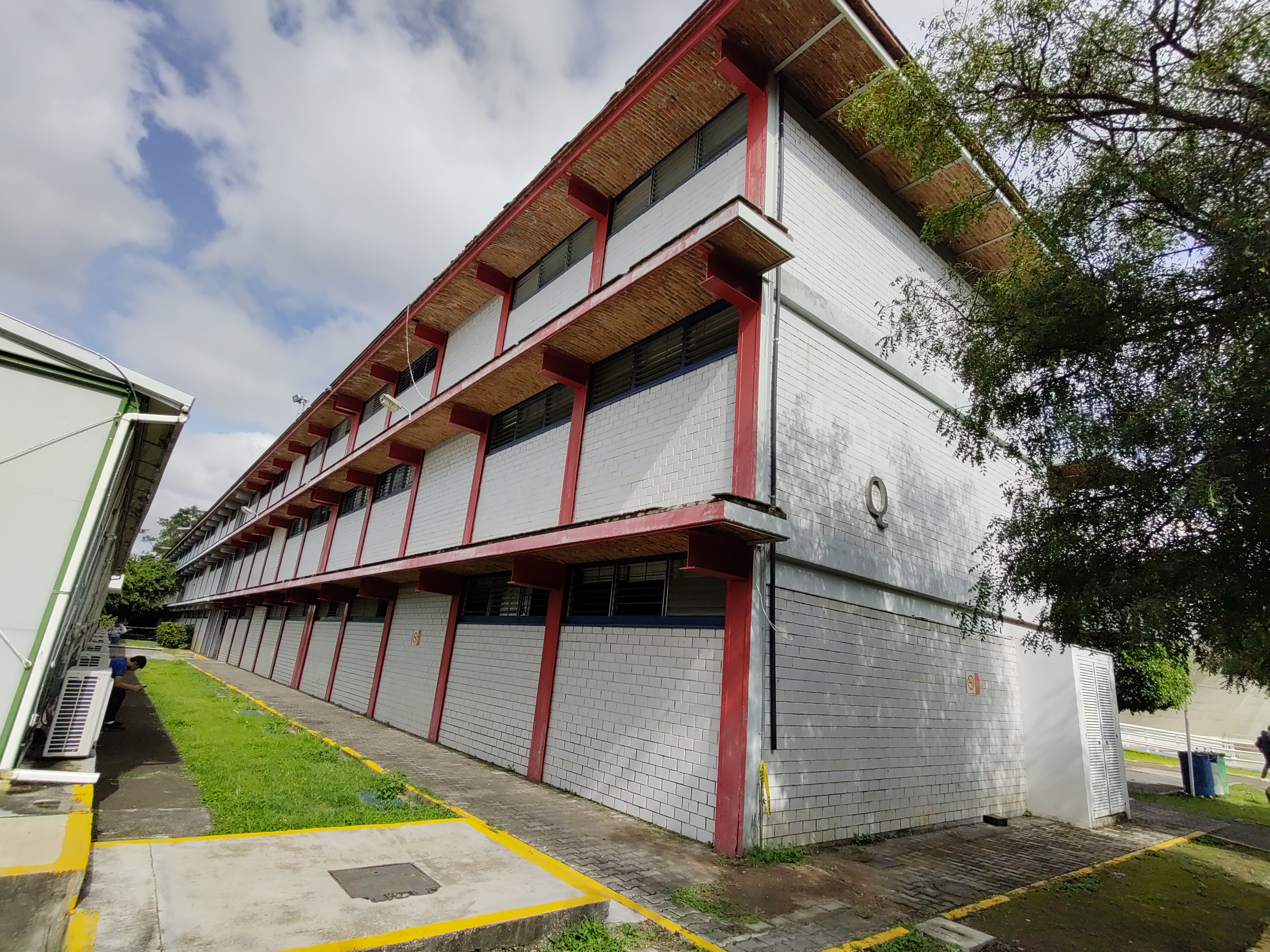
Q building

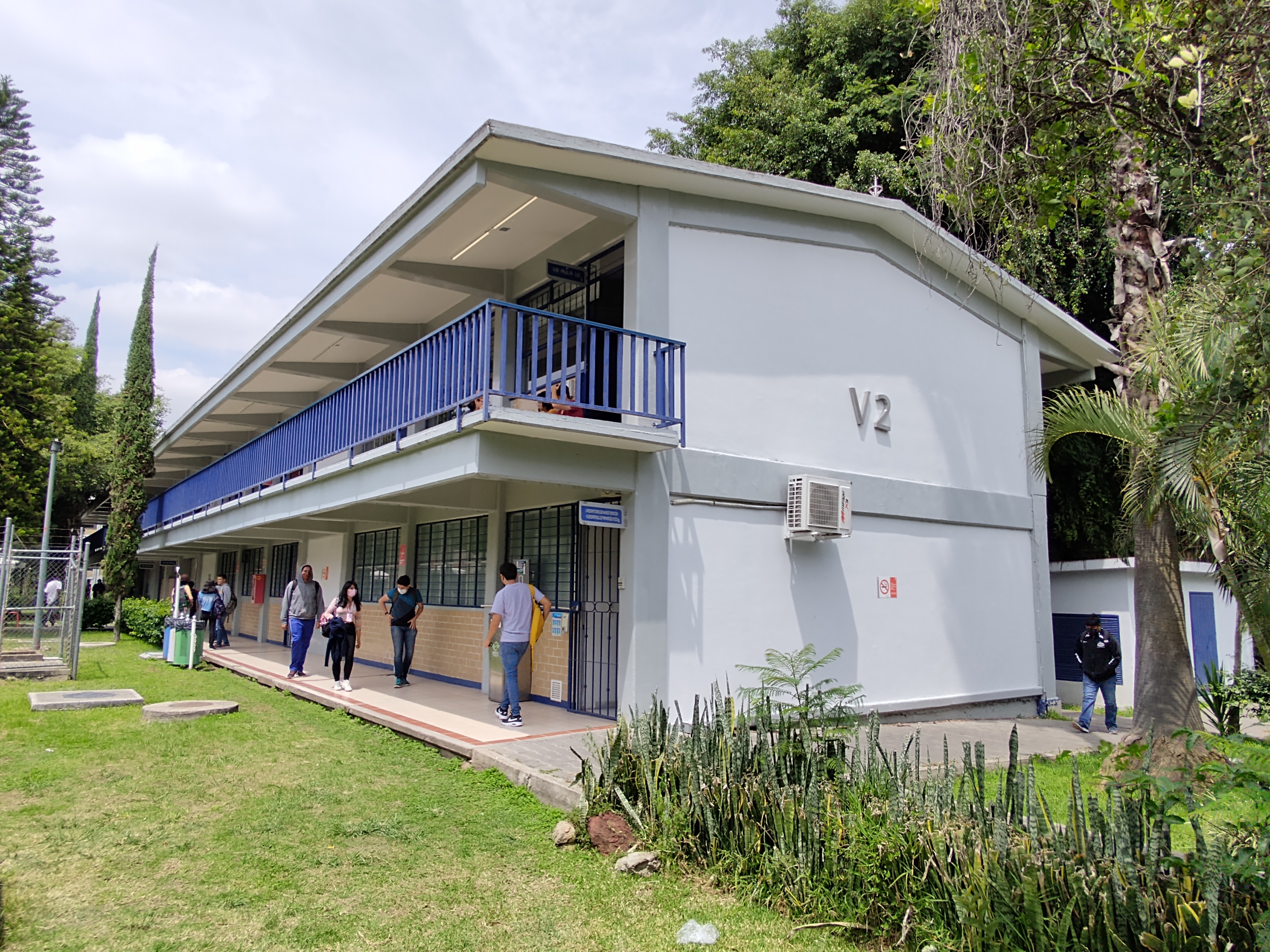
V2 building

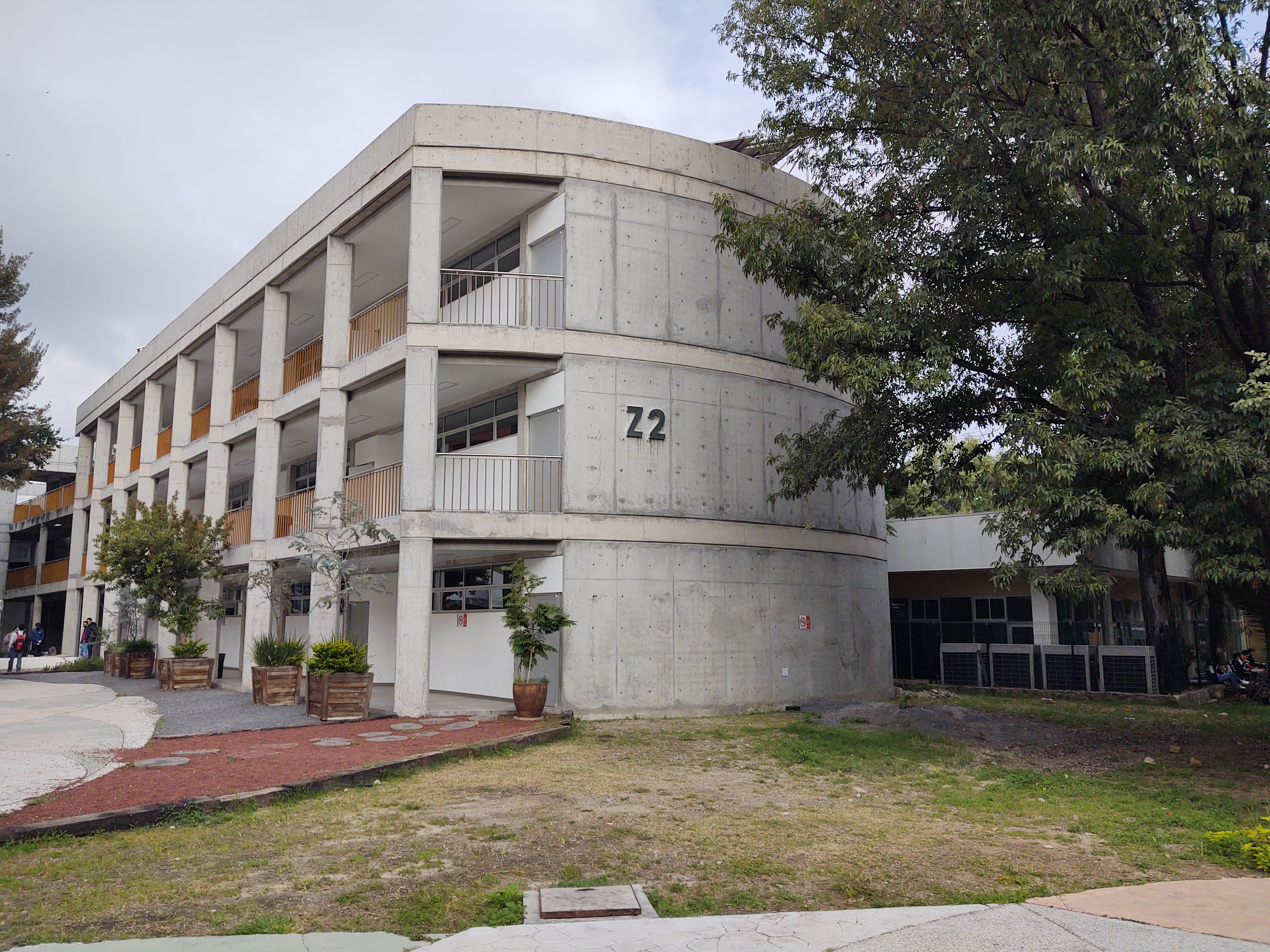
Z2 building

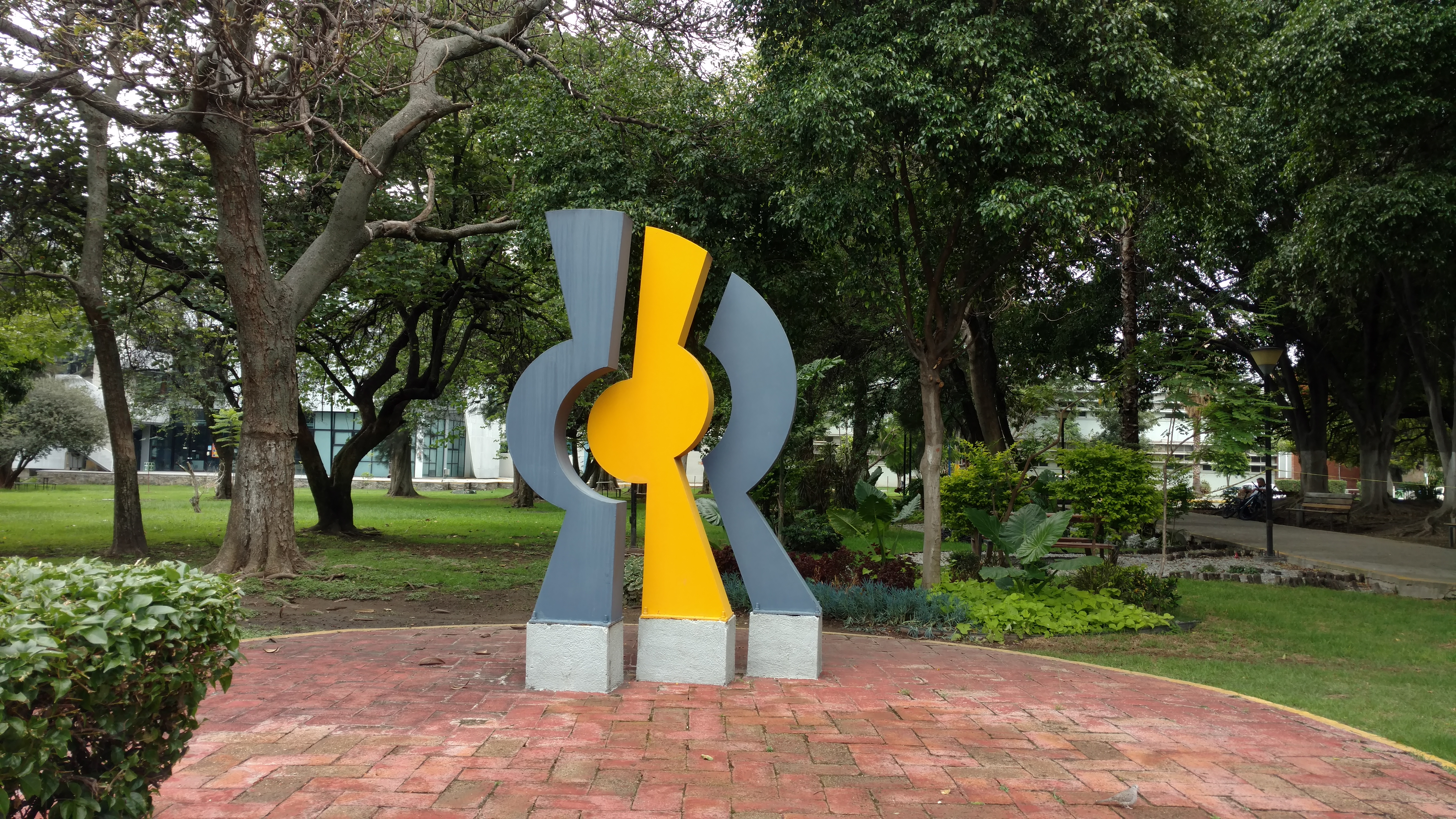
CUCEI logo sculpture in the rectory garden

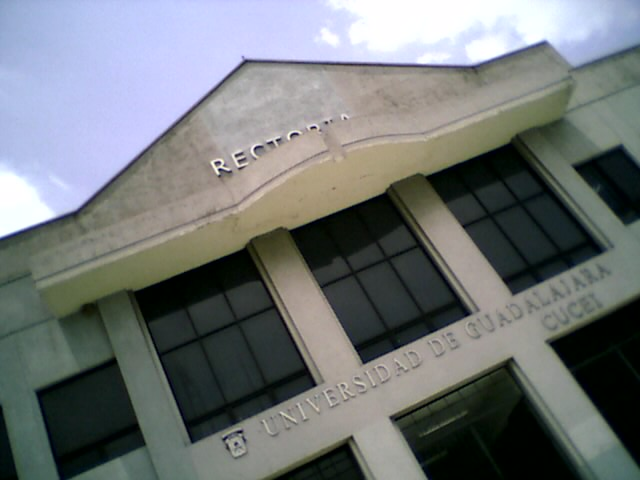
CUCEI rectory in 2007

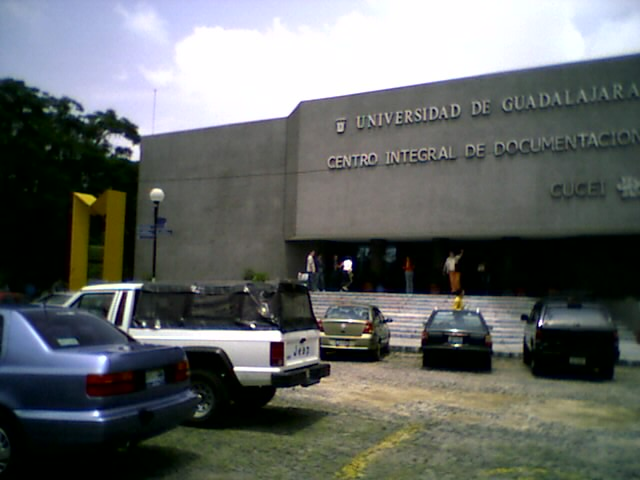
Integral Documentation Center in 2008

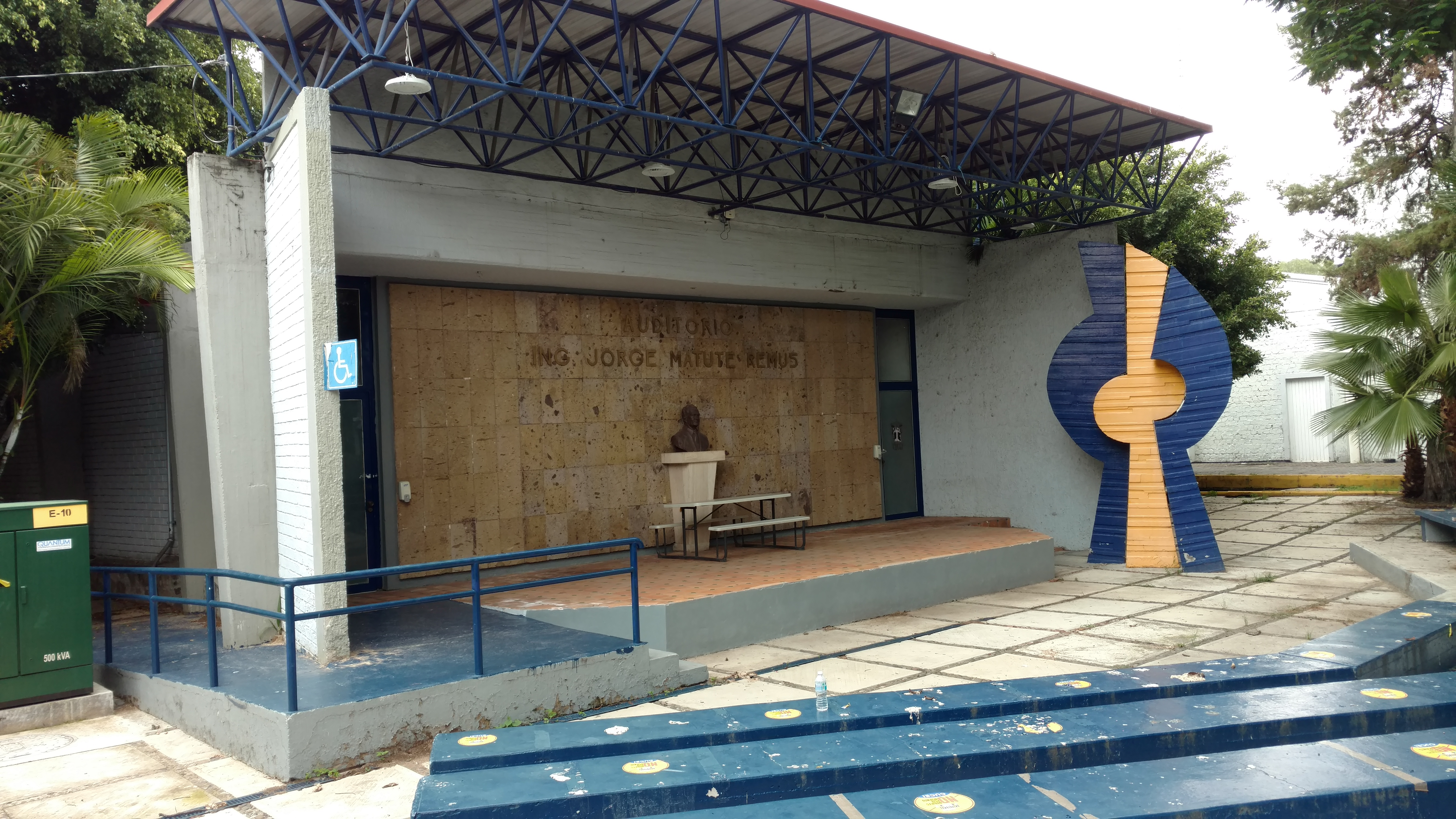
Ing. Jorge Matute Remus auditorium (outside)

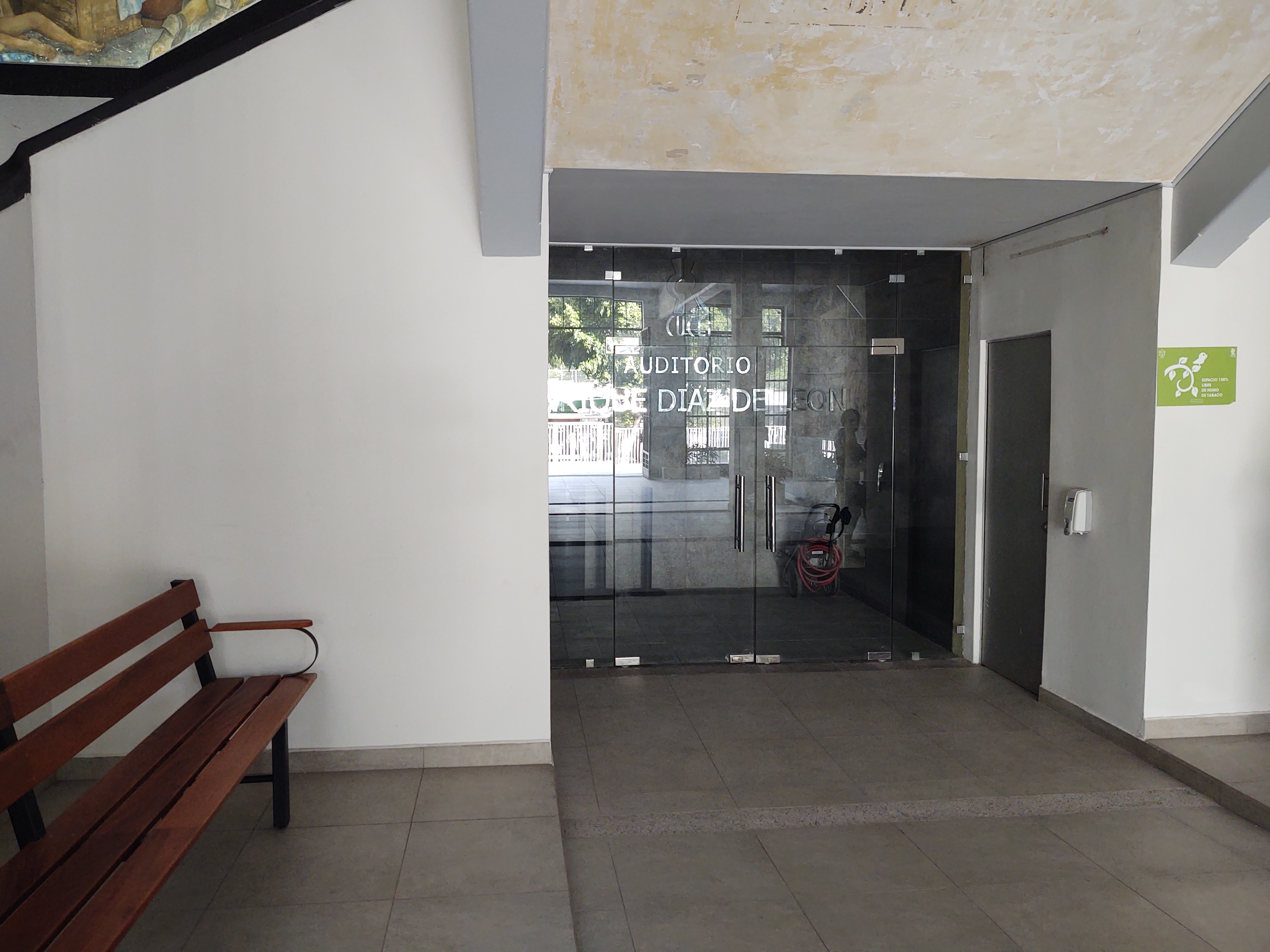
Enrique Díaz de León auditorium (entrance)
