= Installation =

Installation may refer to:

- Installation (Christianity), a Christian liturgical act that formally makes a clergyman assume office of his appointed position at a particular place
- Installation (computer programs), the act of making the program ready for execution
- Installation art, an artistic genre of three-dimensional works that are often site-specific and designed to transform the perception of a space
- Military installation, a grouping of facilities that constitute a permanent military base

== See also ==
- Install (disambiguation)
- Setup (disambiguation)
