= Sheet =

Sheet or Sheets may refer to:

- Bed sheet, a rectangular piece of cloth used as bedding
- Sheet of paper, a flat, very thin piece of paper
- Sheet metal, a flat thin piece of metal
- Sheet (sailing), a line, cable or chain used to control the clew of a sail

== People ==
- Mahmud Sheet Khattab, Iraqi polymath and Major General

== Places ==
- Sheet, Hampshire, a village and civil parish in East Hampshire, Hampshire, England.
- Sheet, Shropshire, a village in Ludford, Shropshire, England.
- Sheets Lake, Michigan, United States.
- Sheets Site, a prehistoric archaeological site in Fulton County, Illinois, United States.
- Sheets Peak, a mountain in the Wisconsin Range, Antarctica.

== Other uses ==
- Sheets (surname), a surname (including a list of people with the name)
- Sheet (computing), a type of dialog box
- "Sheets", a 2003 song by Stephen Malkmus and the Jicks from Pig Lib
- Google Sheets, spreadsheet editor by Google
- Sheet of stamps, a unit of stamps as printed
- Sheet or plate glass, a type of glass
- Ice sheet, a mass of glacier ice
- Sheet, the playing surface in the sport of curling
- Sheet, thin plate of metal
- Sheet, an object of a spectral sequence

== See also ==
- Sheet music (disambiguation)
- Shet (disambiguation)
- Sheetal (disambiguation), a given name
- Sheetz, a convenience store and gasoline station
