= CETI =

CETI or Ceti may refer to:

- Genitive word used to identify the stars belonging to the constellation Cetus
- Communication with extraterrestrial intelligence
- Centro de Enseñanza Técnica Industrial
- Cetí, a fish from Puerto Rico
- Project CETI, an international initiative to understand the communication of sperm whales
