= Install =

Install may refer to:

== Technology ==
- install (Unix), a command line tool for installing files
- INSTALL, a CONFIG.SYS directive
- Factory install, a pre-installed product on a product

== See also ==
- Installation (disambiguation)
- Setup (disambiguation)
