= Seath =

Seath may refer to:

- David Seath (1914–1947), New Zealand politician
- Ethel Seath (1879–1963), Canadian artist
- Jemaima Tiatia-Seath, New Zealand-born Samoan Professor of Pacific Studies
- Seath Holswich (born 1977), Australian politician
- Seath Jackson (1996–2011), American murder victim
- T. B. Seath & Co., a former shipbuilding company at Shawfield, Rutherglen, Scotland

== See also ==
- Seth (disambiguation)
