= The Set-Up =

The Set-Up may refer to:

== Literature ==
- The Set-Up (poem), a 1928 narrative poem by Joseph Moncure March; basis for the 1949 film (see below)
- The Set Up: The Shocking Aftermath to The French Connection, a 1975 book by Robin Moore with Milt Machlin
- The Set-Up (novel), a 1982 novel by Vladimir Volkoff
- The Set-up, a 1997 novel by Paul Erdman
- The Set Up, a 2005 novel by Liz Allen
- The Set Up, a 2009 novel by Sophie McKenzie
- The Set Up, a 2019 novel by Jack Heath; the third installment in the Liars series

== Films and television ==
- The Set-Up (1926 film), an American silent Western starring Art Acord
- The Set-Up (1949 film), an American film noir directed by Robert Wise
- The Set Up (1963 film), a film in the British series Edgar Wallace Mysteries
- The Set-Up (1978), a student film by Kathryn Bigelow
- The Set Up (1990 film), a Hong Kong film featuring Lee Lik-chi
- The Set-Up (1995 film), an American crime thriller
- The Set-Up (2019 film), a Nigerian crime thriller drama film by Niyi Akinmolayan
- The Set Up (Brooklyn Nine-Nine), an episode of Brooklyn Nine-Nine
- "The Set Up" (Parks and Recreation), a 2010 episode of Parks and Recreation
- "The Set Up", an episode of Hunter

== Music ==
- "The Set Up" (song), a 2004 song by Obie Trice
- "The Set Up", a song by Favored Nations from The Music of Grand Theft Auto V

== See also ==
- Setup (disambiguation)
