= Setting =

Setting or Settings most often refer to:

- Location (geography) where something is set
- Setting (narrative), the place and time in a work of narrative, especially fiction
- Computer configuration, or options of a piece of software or computing device

Setting or Settings may also refer to:

== Arts and entertainment ==
- Setting (band), American musical ensemble from Durham, North Carolina
- Setting (narrative), the place and time in a work of narrative, especially fiction
- Set construction in theatrical scenery
- Campaign setting in role-playing play
- Musical setting, the composition of music for an existing text, usually in choral music

== Education ==
- Educational setting, a location where education takes place
- Ability grouping, small groups formed within a single classroom
- Tracking (education), also called streaming, separating pupils by academic ability into groups for all subjects within a school

== Other uses ==
- Setting up to fail, a manipulative technique to engineer failure
- Stonesetting, in jewelry, when a diamond or gem is set into a frame or bed
  - System Settings, a MacOS application
  - Settings (Windows) (also known as the Control Panel)
- Typesetting
- Set and setting, the context for psychedelic drug experiences
- Setting (knot), the tightening of a knot

== See also ==
- Set (disambiguation)
- Setup (disambiguation)
