= Sheets (surname) =

Sheets is a surname. Notable people with the name include:

- Andy Sheets (born 1971), former Major League Baseball player
- Ben Sheets (born 1978), former Major League Baseball pitcher
- Bob Sheets (born 1937), American meteorologist, director of the National Hurricane Center from 1987 to 1995
- Darrell Sheets and his son Brandon, buyers in the reality TV series Storage Wars
- Gavin Sheets (born 1996), American baseball player
- Jim Sheets (1931–2020), former member of the Arkansas House of Representatives
- John M. Sheets (1854–1930), Ohio Attorney General
- John Richard Sheets (1922–2003), American Catholic bishop
- Kory Sheets, American college football player
- Larry Sheets (born 1959), former Major League Baseball player
- Millard Sheets (1907–1989), American painter

== See also ==
- Eric Haber, American professional poker player, nicknamed Sheets
- Sheet (disambiguation)
