= Shet =

Shet may refer to:

- Shet District, a district of Karagandy Province in central Kazakhstan.
- Shett, a title used by some communities originating on western coast of India

== See also ==
- Sheet (disambiguation)
- Seth (disambiguation)
- Sett (disambiguation)
