= Jorge Matute Remus =

Mexican engineer (1912–2002)

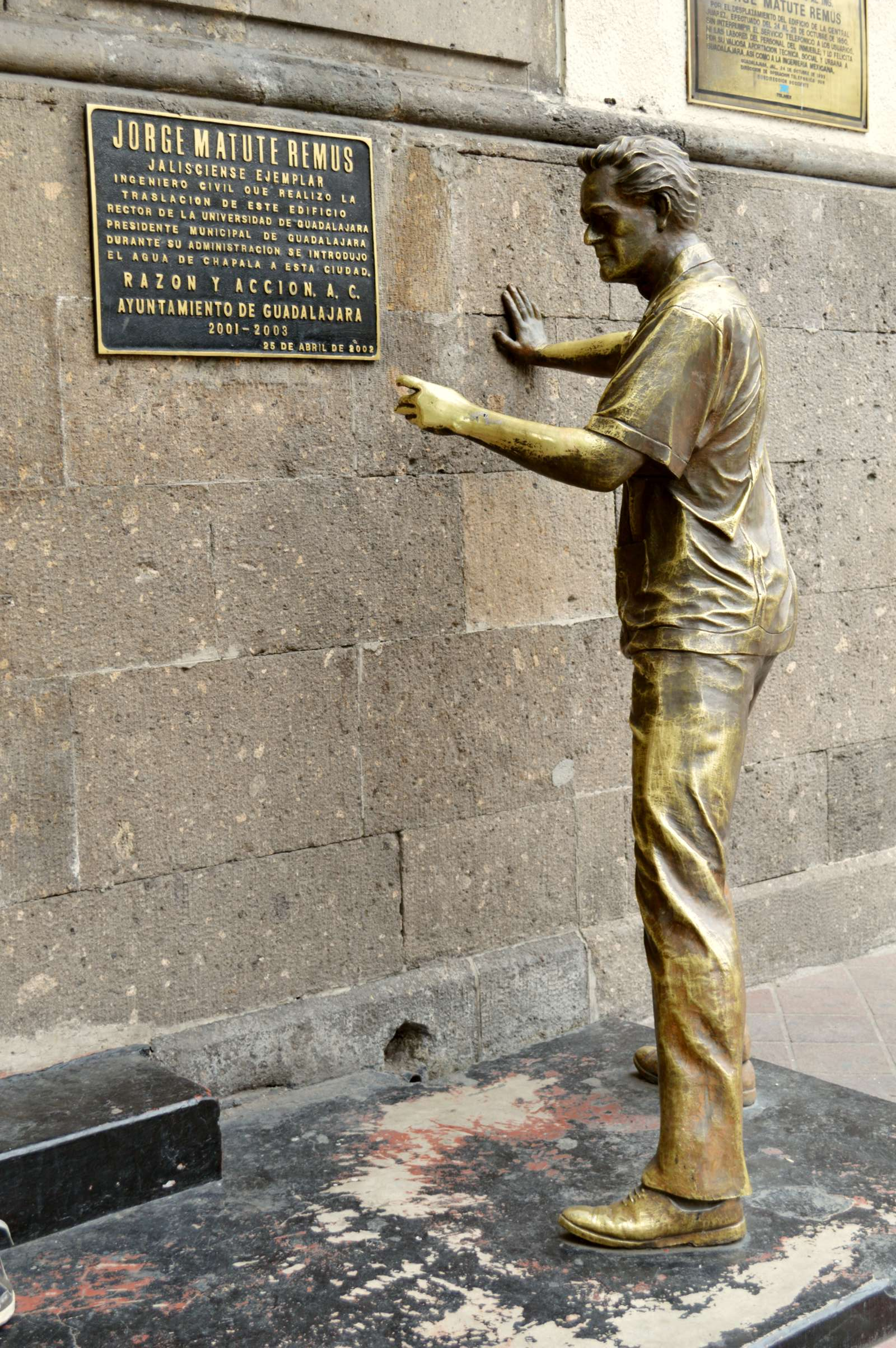
Statue of Jorge Matute Remus "pushing" back the Telmex building to save it from the widening of Avenida Juarez in Guadalajara.

Jorge Matute (February 17, 1912 – July 6, 2002) was a Mexican engineer.

His movement of a 1700-ton Teléfonos de México (Mexican telecommunications) building in 1950 to widen a main street (Avenue Juarez) in Guadalajara earned him a place in the city's history. The building was moved 12 meters away from its original position with all the communication operators working inside. At 23 he designed and built a bridge for a federal Mexican road over Coy river in the Huasteca during a professional internship that gained him respect among engineers at such early stage of his life. He dedicated much of his life to the pursuit of a better urban planning, the provision of water for the city and the improvement of higher education. Matute was dean of the Universidad de Guadalajara (1949–1953) and municipal president (1953–1955) of the same city. He was given several honors by the University of Guadalajara (Masters and Doctoral (2006) Honoris Causa), UNESCO, the National Prize for Engineering, the French Academic Palms, among others.

== Early life ==
Matute Remus was born in Guadalajara, the son of Juan Matute Gil and María Concepción Remus and second of five children. In his early years he had to work to help the household economy due to impoverishment caused by the Mexican revolution. In 1941 he married Esmeralda Villaseñor y Villaseñor and had four children: Juan Jorge, Elena, Esmeralda and Pedro.

== Movement of the telecommunications building ==
The city of Guadalajara needed several modernization works and the state governor of Jalisco at the time, José de Jesús González Gallo, was dedicating plenty of attention to these changes. The broadening of Vallarta Avenue (a major avenue connecting Guadalajara's downtown to the west) was included. Buildings along the avenue were demolished, except for the telecommunications building, which would have left the city without telephone service for at least a week. At this situation, Jorge Matute, then dean of the city's university (Mexico's second-largest in student population), proposed to move the building 12 meters with all the workers inside and functioning as normal in order to keep the telephone service working. The works started with a budget of only US$100,000, only 17% of the cost of demolishing the building and constructing a new one. In order to gain the trust of the employees he asked his wife to enter the building while the movement was taking place. On October 28, 1950, the building was set on its final position, where it still stands with a statue of Matute pushing the building.

== Other works ==
- Founded and built Guadalajara's Technological Institute.
- Founder of CETI (Center for technical and industrial education).
- Built the Guadalajara's water system.
- Founder member of ANUIES (National association of universities and higher education institutes)

=== Matute Remus Bridge ===
- Matute Remus Bridge

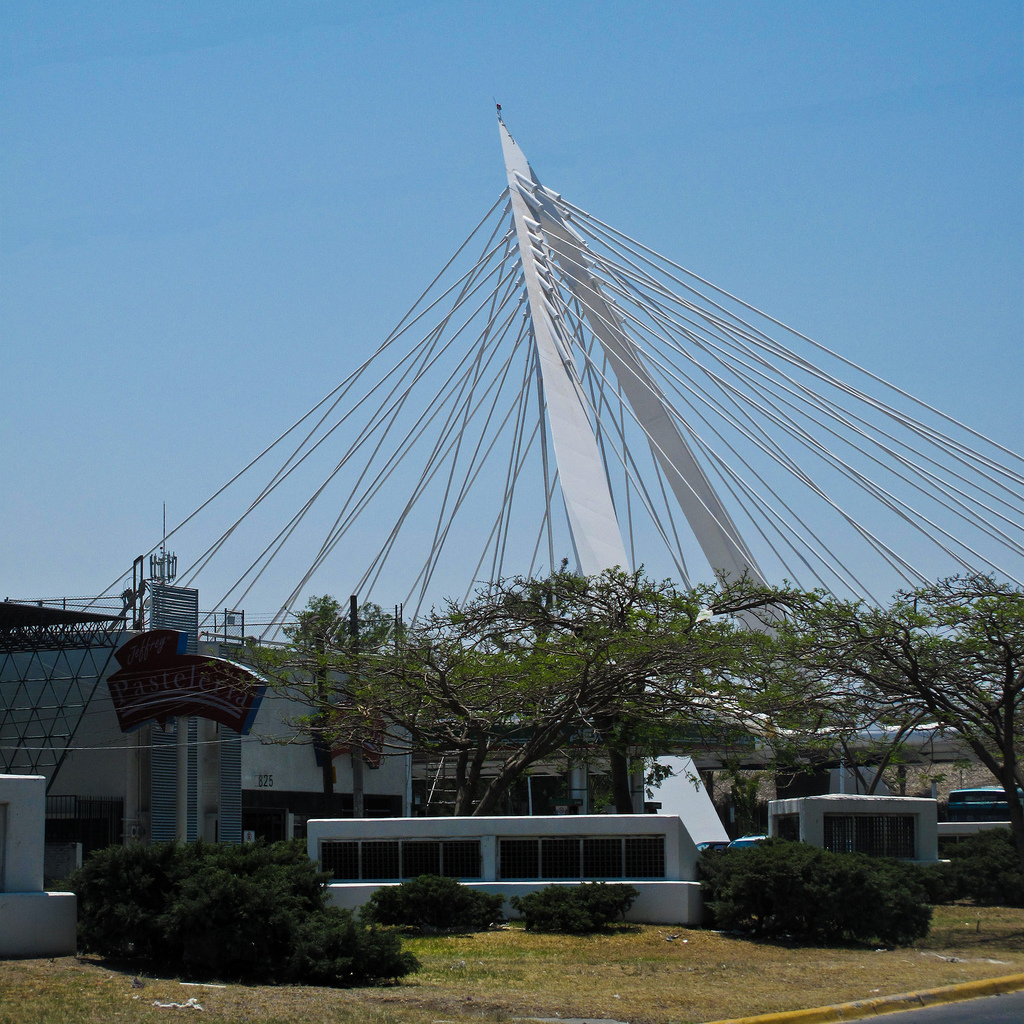
Matute Remus Bridge .
