= Matute Remus Bridge =

Bridge in Guadalajara, Jalisco, Mexico

Matute Remus Puente Jorge Matute Remus
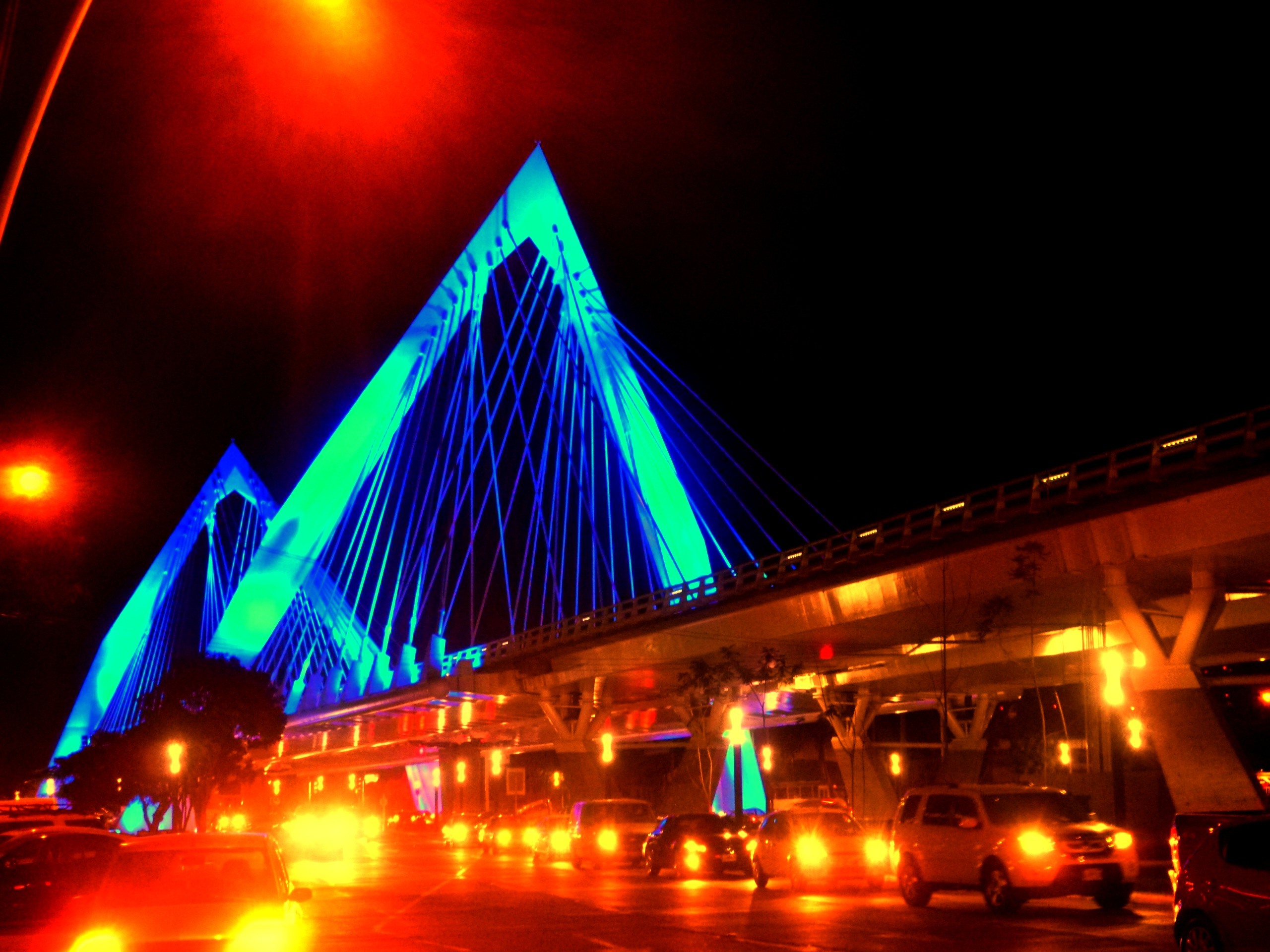
- Coordinates: 20°39′53″N 103°23′38″W
- Carries: Motor vehicles
- Crosses: Jorge Matute Remus
- Locale: Guadalajara in Jalisco, Mexico
- Official name: Matute Remus

Location
- Interactive map of Matute Remus

The Matute Remus Bridge is a cable-stayed bridge located in the state of Jalisco, Mexico. This work is part of a system of bridges that are located on the Lázaro Cárdenas road, at the junction with López Mateos avenue, one of the busiest in the city and that also crosses the 4 central municipalities of the Guadalajara metropolitan area. With this work, the Lázaro Cárdenas road became a low-emission viaduct with fewer traffic lights. The bridge is named in honor of civil engineer Jorge Matute Remus, known for the relocation of the Mexico Telephone building located on Avenida Juárez.

== History ==
The city of Guadalajara draws its trace with two large axes that cross it from east to west and from north to south. At the intersection of López Mateos and Lázaro Cárdenas avenues there was a serious problem of road continuity, due to the accumulation of more than 200 thousand vehicles per day waiting to be distributed to various points. The dense and saturated aspect of the crossing of these avenues was a very deteriorated scenario, a point of insecurity for the pedestrian and a disorder of public transport.

Given the clear need to vent this road point, the Jalisco government undertook the continuous flow highway project without traffic lights along 39 km along the Lázaro Cárdenas avenue, embodied in the "Jalisco State Development Plan 2030".

=== The Matute Remus Bridge ===
The Jalisco government launched a contest of proposals that included the integral solution from the crossing with Arboledas Avenue to Guadalupe Avenue. The winning proposals of the contest were made by the architects Miguel Echauri and Álvaro Morales of the company Metroarquitectura.

The decision to carry out the work required a multidisciplinary approach and analysis that evaluated the road, environmental, social, economic, urban, technical and technological impact.

The Matute Remus Bridge and the Alamo Bridge consolidated Lázaro Cárdenas as a route of fluid traffic.

=== The Lázaro Cárdenas-Vallarta Viaduct ===
The viaduct crosses the 4 central municipalities of the Guadalajara Metropolitan Area, begins at the height of the Zapotlanejo highway and ends on the free road to Nogales, having 25 overpasses and elevations. Which are located (east-west) on Tonaltecas Avenue, Patria Oriente Avenue, Revolution Node, Rio Seco Avenue, Chapala Road, Alamo Bridge, Fuelle Street, March 18 Avenue, Liberation Park, Gobernador Curiel Avenue, Avenida 8 de Julio, Avenida Colón, Avenida Cruz del Sur, Food Market, Arcos del Milenio, 'Puente Matute Remus', Paseo San Ignacio, Node Vial los Cubos, Avenida Patria, Rafael Sanzio Avenue, Santa María del Pueblito, Central Avenue, Western Peripheral, Aviation Avenue, Pan-American Return.

== Design ==
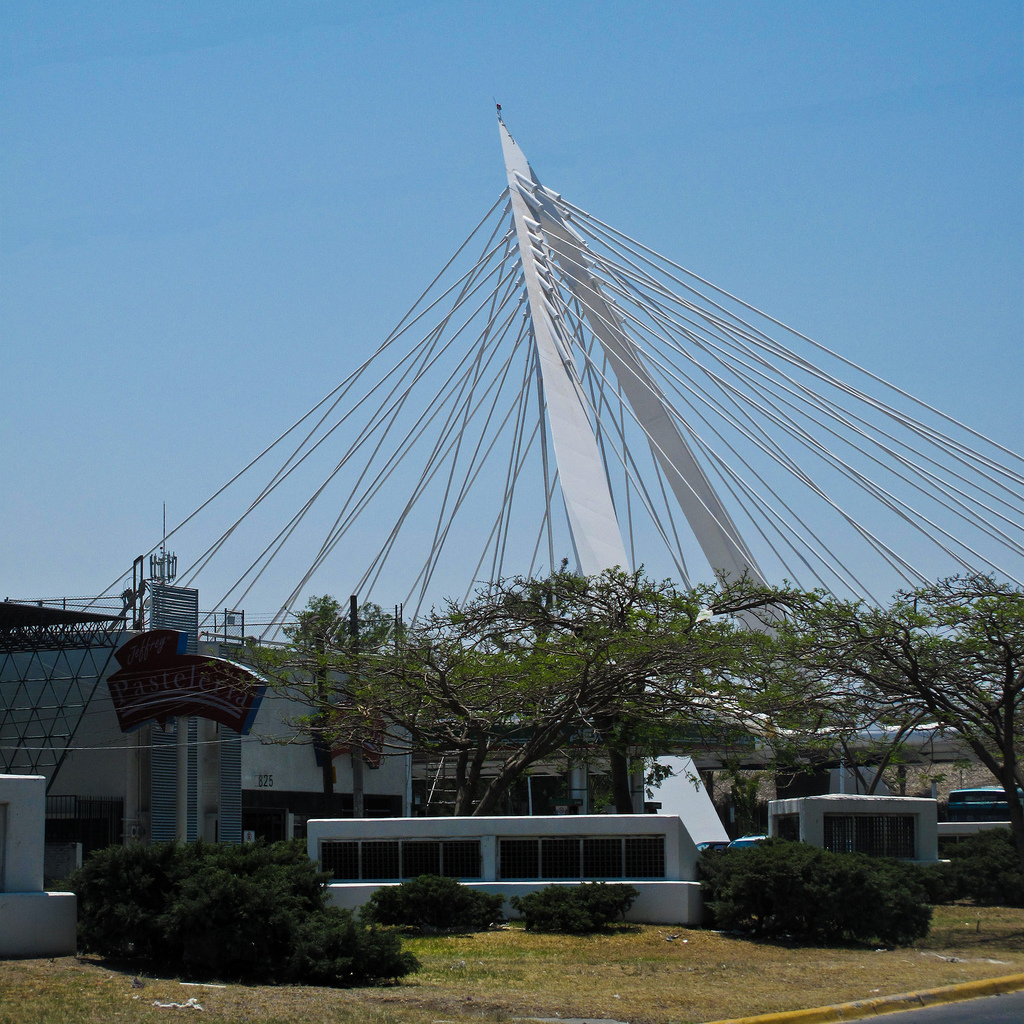
Bridge design

Heirs of the tradition of doing urban art more than just public works, the architects Echauri and Morales, former collaborators and disciples of Fernando González Gortázar, designed a bridge that broke with the paradigms representing the old highway bridges inserted in the city. Developing the project with a scheme of suspended bridge or cable-stayed proved the ability of designers, calculators, state government and local construction companies like TRENA Constructora to renew visions and principles to tune them to the needs contemporary

The only part of the structure that, for technical reasons, must be solid is that of the suspended section, because it is the only one that is hung and must support the work in a single body, however its shadow does not affect the wooded area, because below the street predominates. The design of the Matute Remus bridge is so friendly and harmonious that it can be enjoyed even when looking up while walking or passing underneath, since it has an attractive structure visible to the ceiling, unlike most public works that neglect the lower space of the bridges.

The bridge is functional and avant-garde, with an advanced architectural design, it has a linear recreational park under its structure, a new sports unit and it gave recovery of spaces for the pedestrian facilitating its transport. Its modern structure improves the urban image, by keeping the wiring hidden, and recover living spaces.

In addition to being the only cable-stayed bridge that does not cross a surface of water.

=== An illuminated link ===
The architectural proposal of the Matute Remus Bridge always considered the bridge's night stamp, therefore, a lighting program was developed that considered playful criteria such as the change of color and light intensities, a sequence that reveals the different parts of the structure: linear park, the roadway and the elevated bridge. The luminous atmosphere of the work distinguishes it as a strategic element of the road system and the urban image.

The bridge was the finalist of the "Urban Public Works" 2011 award by Works Magazine.

== Construction ==
Once the project was studied and its construction approved, it was necessary to program the construction process, which was carried out in a period of 1 year and four months. The formal start took place on September 28, 2009.

=== Preliminary work and work planning ===
The preliminary works of a work include any activity related to licenses and permits, cleaning of the work area, felling of trees, line and leveling, provisional installations of water and electricity, enclosures provisional construction area, etc.

During the preliminary works of the work, the delimitation and preparation of the area was done, eliminating the circulation of the central highway over Lázaro Cárdenas and diverting to the lateral ones, remaining crosses in Arboledas, López Mateos and Guadalupe.

The work was planned in 6 stages:

1. construction of ramps and relocation of trees (duration 21 weeks);
2. construction of piles of support for fixed bridge (duration 21 weeks);
3. construction of foundation footings for bridge (duration 8 weeks);
4. fixed bridge structure assembly (duration 36 weeks);
5. assembly of elements of the Matute Remus bridge structure (duration 20 weeks);
6. Urban image development, recovery of green areas and pedestrian living areas (duration 12 weeks).

=== Construction process ===
Since its original conception and due to the choice of materials such as steel and concrete combined, it was possible to produce almost everything in the workshop. The idea of combining these fundamental materials in the structure allowed to take full advantage of their performance, for example, steel allows to have greater clearings with less cant. Most of the work was done on the ridge of the avenue, which greatly reduced the inconvenience to different users and residents.

== Elements of the road system ==
The road system consists of two bridges parallel, with a separation between them of 5 meters that allows the passage of light. They only join with a 165 meter cable-stayed section that operates the entire system as the same unit.

=== Tension cables ===
The tension cables that load the bearing boards were manufactured in Spain with the company's technology Freyssinet. The braces are a high density polyduct whose cables are galvanized, are designed to comply with current regulations. They support 340 tons and have a double protection anticorrosive that ensures the minimum durability of 40 years. In a common cable-stayed bridge, the board is connected to the piles that support the earthquake in the lower part and, in the upper part, the cables, so they turn out to be very robust supports. On the other hand, in the conception of the Matute Remus when separating the board from the supports it is possible to implement dampers grounded.

The road system is divided into 3 parts: the eastern part consisting of a ramp 122 m long, 26 m wide and a maximum height of 7.10 m; the western part, a 119 m ramp that joins another 400 m of bearing slab that in turn connects with the hanging part. The hanging section has a length of 165 meters supported by 78 tendons or braces.

Its total length is 930 m and 26 m wide, which includes 3 lanes each way. It is estimated that around 200,000 vehicles travel daily

== Sustainability ==
From the beginning, the bridge was planned as an environmentally friendly work, since reforested with native species and recovery of green and wooded areas was made by planting 5 new trees for each tree felled.

Construction began with a symbolic reforestation event on the avenue. The project concluded with 1200 new trees in the area thanks to the reforestation and adoption program promoted by the state government, through the group of young people who visited neighboring settlers house by house as.

=== Conflicts ===
Several citizen organizations and neighbors opposed the construction of this bridge. The reasons were several: from the lack of a comprehensive urban mobility plan, its cost, its construction without having previously made a citizen consultation and the lack of the permits required for its construction. Some of these organizations launched the "Pass it AUN better" campaign, which was intended to be the counterpart of the "Pass it better" campaign promoted by the Jalisco State Government.

== Effects on government and society ==
In Jalisco, civil organizations and citizen participation in general are increasingly aware of their incidence to change, prevent or channel government actions that they feel alien and harmful or their own and favorable.

The socialization process, undertaken at the initiative of the governor Emilio González Márquez to ensure the acceptance and approval of the Matute Remus Bridge by Jalisco, was a government action unprecedented in the state. Involving not only the citizens of the nation, but other nations such as the United States, Russia, Colombia, Japan, Spain, among others.

The socialization strategy that accompanied the construction process of the bridge offered updated information to the public, opened the vital spaces for dialogue with the people, achieved the necessary agreements for the development of the work and competitively linked the governing bodies in a complex work .
