= Setting (narrative) =

Aspect of literature

A setting (or backdrop) is the time and geographic location in a fictional or non-fictional narrative. Setting helps establish a story's mood and may include its social and cultural context, sometimes called a story world or milieu. Elements of setting include culture, historical period, geography, and time of day. Along with plot, character, theme, and style, setting is one of the fundamental components of fiction.

== Role ==
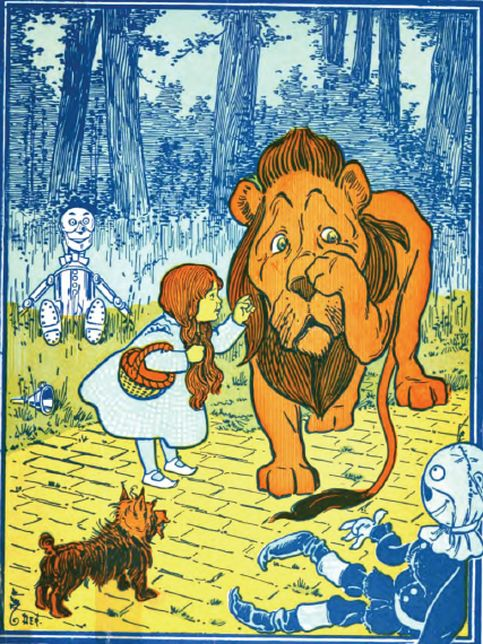
An illustration by W. W. Denslow from The Wonderful Wizard of Oz (1900), showing Dorothy and her companions on the Yellow Brick Road.

Setting can include the social environment in which the events of a novel occur. Time is also part of setting, which may remain constant or change throughout a narrative, for example, through changing seasons.

Setting can take three basic forms: natural, cultural and historical contexts, or human-created environments. Natural settings include landscapes, weather, seasons, and living creatures. Cultural and historical settings reflect the events and traditions that shape a story's characters and locations. Human-created or inhabited places include such as houses, parks, streets, and schools.

== Types ==
Setting may take various forms:

- Alternate history
- Campaign setting
- Constructed world (Worldbuilding)
- Dream world
- Dystopia
- Fantasy world
- Fictional city
- Fictional country
- Fictional crossover
- Fictional location
- Fictional universe
- Future history
- Imaginary world
- Mythical place
- Parallel universe
- Planets in science fiction
- Simulated reality
- Utopia
- Virtual reality

== See also ==
- British regional literature
- Index of fictional places
- Landscape
- List of fictional universes
- Setting (disambiguation)
- List of narrative techniques
- Worldbuilding
