= Seth (given name) =

Male given name

- Pronunciation: /ˈsɛθ/
- Gender: Male

Origin
- Origin: Hebrew
- Meaning: "To Set" "To Place" "To Give"
- Region of origin: Eretz Israel

Seth is a masculine given name, tracing its origin to the biblical figure Seth, the third son of Adam and Eve. The English form is derived from the Greek Σήθ (Sḗth), ultimately from the Hebrew שֵׁת (Šēθ).

== People ==
Notable people with the name include:

=== Given name ===
Arts and entertainment

- Seth Abramson (born 1976), American poet
- Seth Adkins (born 1989), American actor
- Seth Avett (born 1980), American singer
- Seth Flynn Barkan (born 1980), American poet
- Seth Bingham (1882–1972), American organist
- Seth Binzer (1974–2024), American musician
- Seth Cardew (1934–2016), British potter
- Seth Carr (born 2007), American actor
- Seth Eastman (1808–1875), American painter
- Seth Ennis (born 1992), American singer
- Seth Fedelin (born 2002), Filipino actor, model, singer and dancer
- Seth Fisher (1972–2006), American comic book artist
- Seth Gabel (born 1981), American actor
- Seth Gilliam (born 1968), American actor
- Seth Grahame-Smith (born 1976), American writer
- Seth Green (born 1974), American actor
- Seth Herzog (born 1970), American comedian
- Seth Holt (1923–1971), British film director
- Seth Horan, American bass guitarist
- Seth Kinman (1815–1888), early settler and a nationally recognized entertainer
- Seth Lakeman (born 1977), English folk singer
- Seth MacFarlane (born 1973), American television producer
- Seth Meyers (born 1973), American actor and comedian
- Seth Mnookin (born 1972), American writer
- Seth Morgan (novelist) (1949–1990), American novelist
- Seth Putnam (1968–2011), American vocalist
- Seth Rogen (born 1982), Canadian actor
- Seth Sakai (1932–2007), American actor
- Seth Sentry (born Seth Gabriel Marton; 1983), Australian rapper and singer
- Seth Troxler (born 1985), American electronic music producer

Journalism

- Seth Davis (born 1970), American sports journalist
- Seth Doane (born 1978), American reporter
- Seth Godin (born 1960), American author
- Seth Goldman (television reporter), American entertainment reporter and producer
- Seth Lipsky (born 1946), American newspaper editor

Politics and military

- Seth Barton (1829–1900), American general
- Seth W. Brown (1841–1923), American politician
- Seth Bullock (1849–1919), American sheriff
- Seth Wallace Cobb (1838–1909), American politician
- Seth Govind Das (1896–1974), Indian politician
- Seth Hammett (born 1946), American politician
- Seth Harding (1734–1814), American naval officer
- Seth Hastings (1762–1831), American politician
- Seth Jermy (1653–1724), British naval officer
- Seth Jones (born 1972), American political scientist
- Seth Low (1850–1916), American politician
- Seth May (1802–1881), justice of the Maine Supreme Judicial Court
- Seth Obeng (born 1945), Ghanaian general
- Seth Sendashonga (1951–1998), Rwandan politician
- Seth Storrs (1756–1837), American politician
- Seth Warner (1743–1784), American soldier
- Seth P. Waxman (born 1951), American lawyer

Science

- Seth Berkley (born 1956), American epidemiologist
- Seth Scott Bishop (1852–1923), American laryngologist
- Seth Boyden (1788–1870), American inventor
- Seth M. Cohen, chemist
- Seth Lover (1910–1997), American inventor
- Seth Roberts (1953–2014), American psychologist
- Seth Shostak (born 1943), American astronomer

Sports

- Seth Ablade (born 1983), Ghanaian soccer player
- Seth Abner (born 1995), American Call of Duty eSports player; known by his gamertag, Scump
- Seth Adams (born 1985), American football player
- Seth Beer (born 1996), American baseball player
- Seth Blair (born 1989), American baseball player
- Seth Coleman (born 2000), American football player
- Seth Collins (born 1996), American football player
- Seth Curry (born 1990), American basketball player
- Seth Enslow (born 1975), American motorcyclist
- Seth Etherton (born 1976), American baseball player
- Seth Greenberg (born 1956), American basketball coach
- Seth Greisinger (born 1975), American baseball player
- Seth Griffith (born 1993), Canadian ice hockey player
- Seth Halvorsen (born 2000), American baseball player
- Seth Henigan (born 2003), American football player
- Seth Hinrichs (born 1993), American/German basketball player
- Seth Jarvis (born 2002), Canadian ice hockey player
- Seth Johnson (born 1979), retired former England international footballer
- Seth Joyner (born 1964), American football player
- Seth Kimbrough (born 1982), American BMX rider
- Seth Lugo (born 1989), American baseball player
- Seth Marler (born 1981), American football player
- Seth Martinez (born 1994), American baseball player
- Seth McGowan (born 2001), American football player
- Seth McLaughlin (born 2001), American football player
- Seth Roland (born 1957), American soccer player and coach
- Seth Stammler (born 1981), American soccer player
- Seth Trembly, American soccer player and coach
- Seth Wescott (born 1976), American snowboarder

Other

- Seth Farber (born 1966), American rabbi
- Seth Joshua (1858–1925), Welsh Revival Evangelist
- Seth Privacky (1980–2010), American murderer

=== Pseudonym ===
- Seth (cartoonist) (born 1962), pen name of Canadian cartoonist Gregory Gallant
- Patryk "Seth" Sztyber, guitarist of Polish metal band Behemoth
- Seth Rollins (born 1986), ring name of American professional wrestler Colby Lopez

== Fictional characters ==
- Seth Armstrong, a character in the British television series Emmerdale
- Seth Brundle, a character in the 1986 film The Fly
- Seth Clearwater, a werewolf in the Twilight novels by Stephenie Meyer
- Seth Cohen, a character in the television series The O.C.
- Seth Garin, a character in the 1996 novel The Regulators by Richard Bachman
- Seth Gecko, a criminal in the 1996 film From Dusk till Dawn
- Seth Hazlitt, a character in the television series Murder, She Wrote
- Seth Pecksniff, a character in the Charles Dickens novel Martin Chuzzlewit
- Seth Sorenson, a character in the Fablehaven series of novels by Brandon Mull
- Seth, a character in the television series Di-Gata Defenders
- Seth (Phantasy Star IV), a character from the video game Phantasy Star IV
- Seth (Stargate), a character in the television series Stargate SG-1
- Seth (The King of Fighters), a character in the game series The King of Fighters
- Seth, a character in the video game Deltarune

== See also ==
- Seth (disambiguation)
- Seth (surname)
