= Sheet music (disambiguation) =

Sheet music is musical notation written on paper.

Sheet music may also refer to:

- Sheet Music (10cc album), 1974
- Sheet Music (Barry White album), 1980
- Sheet Music Plus, an online retailer of sheet music based in California, United States
- Computer sheet music, software for creating, editing, and printing sheet music
- Sheet Music (novel), a 2003 book set in New York City by M. J. Rose
- Sheet Music, a 1998 album by Nancy Sinatra

== See also ==
- Sheet (disambiguation)
