= SET (arts organisation) =

London arts organisation

SET is a London-based arts project founded in 2016 by Josh Field, Roland Fischer-Vousden and Ollie Tobin.

SET runs arts centres in buildings in London, curating an arts programme and providing affordable artists studios. SET has "long been a ubiquitous presence in the London art world", known for "its characterful transformations of unoccupied buildings" and the "temporary use of vacant buildings or land for a socially beneficial purpose until such a time that they can be brought back into commercial use again". The organisation was founded in response to the crisis of affordability in the arts in London in the UK, creating communities of artists and providing cheap studios in London. SET's arts programme is known for being eclectic, often led by the communities of artists working in and local to centres, political, and interdisciplinary, focusing on live events featuring visual art as well as music, performance and text-based practices.

SET is a member of London's Affordable Artists' Studio Network (LAASN).

== History ==
SET was founded in 2016 as an arts project in a former paint factory on Alscot Road. Two of the founders of SET previously founded the artists collective DIG. In 2017 SET expanded into a second site, Capstan House, and opened a community pub and music venue in the closed pub, The Greenwich Pensioner. Art band, Ectopia, played an all-day concert at the Greenwich Pensioner in 2017.

In 2021, SET opened a 140,000 sq ft project in Riverside House in Woolwich, SET Woolwich, offering studios and facilities to over 600 artists and running an arts programme in ancillary project spaces, including The Vault. In 2022, SET also opened sites in Ealing and Kensington. Since 2022, SET has run SET Social, an affordable members club, social centre and arts venue in Peckham with a community garden, with long-running activities such as Arts for Dementia workshops, a chess club, and Page of Wands writing group. SET Woolwich closed in 2025. In 2025, the organisation opened SET Vauxhall.

== Associate membership structure ==
SET follows an associate membership-based structure, in which artists who take on studios become associate members of the organisation. In 2024, there are currently approximately 1,000 associate members with studios at SET.
