= Statue of Jorge Matute Remus (Centro, Guadalajara) =

Statue in Guadalajara, Jalisco, Mexico

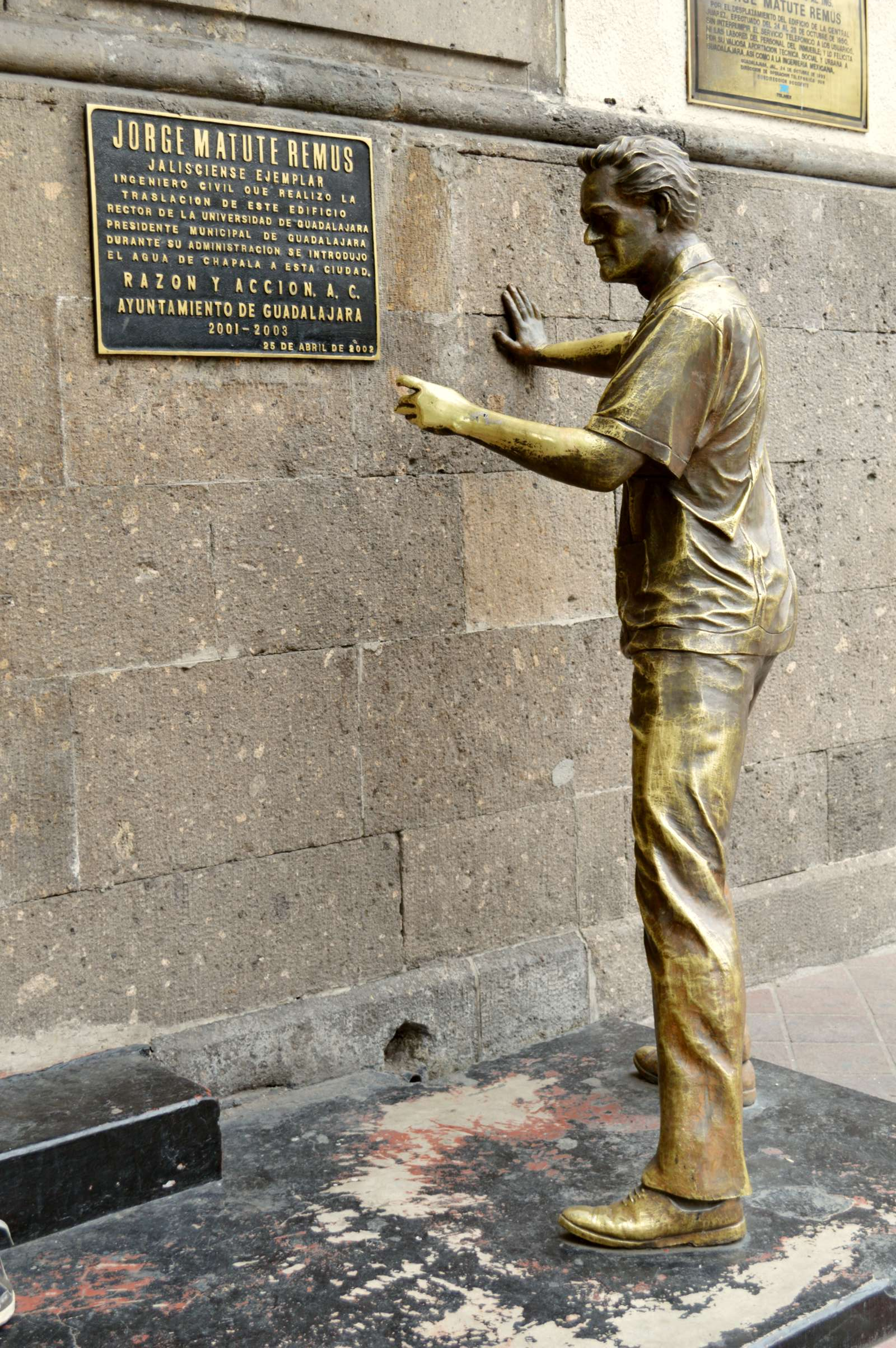
- The statue in 2015
- Subject: Jorge Matute Remus
- Location: Guadalajara, Jalisco, Mexico; 20°40′30.5″N 103°21′2.5″W

A statue of Jorge Matute Remus is installed in front of a Telmex building on Juárez Avenue, in Centro, Guadalajara, in the Mexican state of Jalisco. An engineer, Matute Remus managed to move the building 12 meters (39 ft) away without affecting the company's operations. The statue simulates Matute Remus pushing the building backwards. In August 2018, its bronze plaque was stolen.
