= Simulated Emergency Test =

Amateur radio training exercise

The annual Simulated Emergency Test (SET) is a training exercise involving the Amateur Radio Emergency Service (ARES) and the National Traffic System (NTS), a message-handling service of amateur radio. The American Radio Relay League is a prime mover in this event, which is organized somewhat like a contest. Its primary purposes are to evaluate strengths and weaknesses in emergency preparedness and communications, and to demonstrate amateur radio to the public.

During the first full weekend of October of every year in the United States, a nationwide radio communications network is set up that links every major city and most of the geography of the country. This technological infrastructure is set up from scratch within a few hours at locations that vary from state and local government Emergency Operations Centers to isolated areas without utilities of any kind. Every mode of radio communications is utilized including analog, digital, voice, data, simplex, duplex, satellites and even automated relay stations launched on aircraft and with weather balloons. For no more than 48 continuous hours, this nationwide radio communications network is exercised with the primary objective of proving the system's readiness and capabilities. Then as quickly as it was set up, the system is dismantled and stored in preparation for when it is needed. The system has demonstrated its value during earthquakes, hurricanes, forest fires, terrorist attacks, and other disasters. This capability is provided by volunteers who hone their technical skills and acquire, build, and maintain their own equipment. These radio engineers and operators, along with their equipment, combine into an important resource for emergency communications.

In India, Vigyan Prasar, an apex body for science popularization under the Department of Science and Technology coordinates simulated disaster communication exercises and also organizes trainings to help people getting ham radio licenses in areas which are vulnerable to natural calamities.
