= Seth (disambiguation) =

Seth was the third son of Adam and Eve in the Bible.

Seth may also refer to:

- Strong exponential time hypothesis
- Seth (given name)
- Seth (surname)
- Seth (cartoonist)
- Seth, Germany
- Seth Material, a collection of writings allegedly from "Seth" a disembodied entity channeled by Jane Roberts
- Set (deity), also known as Seth
- Cyclone Seth (2021), a weak tropical cyclone that made landfall on Australia
- "Seth", a song by Big Black from Bulldozer

== See also ==
- Seath (disambiguation)
- Sethi (disambiguation)
- Shet (disambiguation)
- Sett (disambiguation)
- Set (disambiguation)
- Sethianism
- Sheth, a surname
