= Seti =

Seti or SETI may refer to:

== Astrobiology ==
- SETI, the search for extraterrestrial intelligence.
  - SETI Institute, an astronomical research organization
    - SETIcon, a former convention organized by the SETI Institute
  - Berkeley SETI Research Center, an astronomical research organization
    - SETI@home, a distributed computing project
  - Active SETI, the attempt to send messages to intelligent aliens
  - SETI: Search for Extraterrestrial Intelligence, a 2024 board game

== Egyptology ==
- Seti (commander), grandfather of Seti I
- Seti (Viceroy of Kush)
- Seti I (died 1279 BC), pharaoh
- Seti II (died 1197 BC), pharaoh
- Seti-Merenptah, a son of Seti II
- Seti, son of Amun-her-khepeshef
- Sethi, one of the sons of Ramesses II

== Music ==
- SETI (band), an ambient music band from New York City
- SETI (The Kovenant album), an album by metal band The Kovenant

== Places ==
- Seti River, a tributary of the Karnali River in Nepal
- Seti Gandaki River or Seti River, a tributary of the Trishuli River in Nepal
- Seti Zone, one of the fourteen Zones of Nepal

== See also ==
- Sethi, a surname
- Sette (disambiguation)
- Sete (disambiguation)
- Set (disambiguation)
- CETI (disambiguation)
