= Sete (disambiguation) =

Sete or SETE might refer to:

- Sète, a commune in Languedoc-Roussillon, France
- SETE Linhas Aéreas, a domestic airline in Brazil
- Association of Greek Tourism Enterprises (SETE)
- Bola Sete, a Brazilian guitarist
- Sete (song), a 2022 song by K.O

== See also ==
- Sette (disambiguation)
- Seti (disambiguation)
- Set (disambiguation)
