= Sett (disambiguation) =

A sett is the underground home or den of a family of badgers, usually consisting of a network of tunnels.

Sett or SETT may also refer to:

- Sett (paving), a shaped piece of rock used to make hard surfaces for roads
- The Submarine Escape Training Tower at HMS Dolphin, Gosport, England
- The River Sett, a river in Derbyshire, England
- Sett, the number of warp ends per inch in weaving.
  - Also the pattern of colored threads or yarns that make of up the distinctive plaid of a Scottish tartan
- Mining sett, a legal arrangement used to manage the exploitation of land for the extraction of tin
- Sett, a fictional creature in the animated television series Hellsing
- Meskwaki Settlement, Iowa, called the "Sett" by residents

== See also ==
- Sette (disambiguation)
- Set (disambiguation)
- Seth (disambiguation)
- Shet (disambiguation)
