= Centro de Enseñanza Técnica Industrial =

Technical and Industrial Teaching Center
- Centro de Enseñanza Técnica Industrial (CETI)
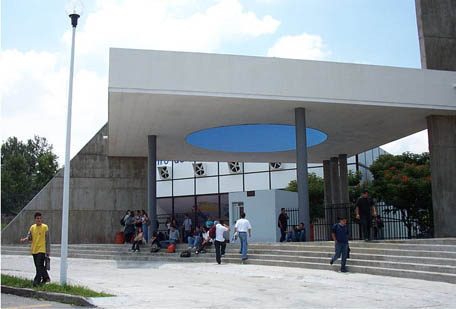
- Location: Guadalajara, Jalisco, Mexico; 20°42′11″N 103°23′21″W
- Website: http://www.ceti.mx/

The Centro de Enseñanza Técnica Industrial (Technical and Industrial Teaching Center), or CETI, is a public, decentralized and federal educational institution in Guadalajara, in the state of Jalisco, Mexico, which promotes research and offers technological services in areas related to the development of the industrial sector in the West region of Mexico. As of 2025, it offers several degrees after high school, in the so called Tecnólogo level, and various degrees in engineering level (with specializations)

== Mission and Vision Statement ==
The formation of leading professionals in technology by offering integral education services and applying scientific and technical knowledge for promoting sustainable development, looking to be a vanguardist institution linked to organizations in the technological field, and forming national and international collaboration networks.

== History ==
This school was founded as the Centro Regional de Enseñanza Técnica Industrial (Regional Technical and Industrial Teaching Center, CeRETI) in 1966, as result of an agreement between the Secretaría de Educación Pública (Public Education Ministry, SEP) and the government of the state of Jalisco under the UNESCO's operations plan MEX/67/520, starting operations in September 1968. The title Tecnólogo was established in 1975 to differentiate the graduates from the technicians of other technical schools. In 1977 CETI was recognized as a subsidiary of the Centro Nacional de Enseñanza Técnica Industrial (National Technical and Industrial Teaching Center, CENETI) but in April 1983 this federal institution was dissolved by Presidential Decree, and changed CeRETI's denomination to the current name Centro de Enseñanza Técnica Industrial (CETI)."

== Campuses ==
There are three campuses ("Planteles") in Guadalajara's Metropolitan Zone: Plantel Colomos, in the Fraccionamiento Providencia of the Municipio de Guadalajara; Plantel Tonalá, in the Municipio de Tonalá; and Plantel Rio Santiago in the Fraccionamiento Urbi Paseos de Santiago II, also in the Municipio de Tonalá.

== Affiliations ==
CETI is a member of the National Association of Universities and Higher Education Institutions (ANUIES).

== Technologist Careers ==
There are (as of 2025) twelve careers offered in Tecnólogo level:

Career	Offered in campus
Automatización y Robótica (Robotics and Automation)	Colomos
Calidad y Productividad (Quality Control and Productivity)	Tonalá, Río Santiago
Construcción (Construction of Buildings)	Colomos
Desarrollo de Software (Software Development)	All
Desarrollo Electrónico (Electronics Development)	Tonalá
Diseño y Mecánica Industrial (Industrial Mechanics and Design)	Colomos
Electromecánica (Electromechanics)	Colomos
Mecánica Automotriz (Automobile Mechanics)	Colomos
Químico en Alimentos (Food Chemicals Technologist)	Tonalá
Químico en Fármacos (Drug Chemicals Technologist)	Colomos, Tonalá
Químico en procesos y Biotecnología (Processing and Biotechnology Chemical Technologist)	Tonalá
Sistemas Electrónicos y Telecomunicaciones (Electronic Systems and Telecommunications)	Colomos

== Engineering Careers ==
There are offered (as of 2025) seven Engineering careers:

Career	Offered in Campus
Civil Sustentable (Sustainable Civil Engineering)	Colomos
Desarrollo de Software (Software Development)	Colomos, Tonalá
Diseño Electrónico y Sistemas Inteligentes (Electronics Development and Smart Systems)	Colomos
Industrial (Industrial Engineering)	Colomos
Mecatrónica (Mechatronics)	Colomos
Tecnología de Software (Software Technology)	Colomos
Bioquímica (Biochemistry)	Tonalá
