= Setup =

Setup (the noun) or set up (the verb) may refer to:

== Arts, entertainment, and media ==
=== Films ===
- Set Up (2005 film), a 2005 Hong Kong horror film
- Setup (2011 film), a 2011 action thriller heist film

=== Literature ===
- Set Up, a 1992 novel by Peter Corris
- Set Up, a 1999 novel by Claire McNab

=== Music ===
- Setup (album), a 1994 album by jazz pianist Stanley Cowell

== Sports ==
- Racing setup, in auto racing
- Setup pitcher

== Other uses ==
- Setup (storytelling), the introduction in a plot of an element that will be useful to the story only later, when the payoff comes
- Setup, also called frameup, providing false evidence or false testimony in order to falsely prove someone guilty of a crime
- Setup, installation (computer programs)
- Setup, power-on self-test
- Setup, on page 104 of The Black Ice, delivery of an alcoholic drink in a bar
- Setup cost, the cost of a step in manufacturing changeover

== See also ==
- Setting up to fail, a manipulative technique to engineer failure
- Set (disambiguation)
- Setting (disambiguation)
- The Set-Up (disambiguation)
