= Sette =

Sette may refer to:

== People ==
- Alessandro Sette, Italian immunologist
- Giancarlo Sette, Italian astronomer, namesake of the asteroid 8885 Sette
- Oscar Elton Sette (1900–1972), American fisheries scientist
- Sérgio Sette Câmara (b. 1998), Brazilian race car driver

=== Fictional characters ===
- Sette Frummagem, the main protagonist of Unsounded

== Places ==
- Sette Daban, a mountain range in Russia
- Sette Comuni, Cimbria, Veneto, Italy; seven comuni that formed a Cimbrian enclave in the Veneto region of northeast Italy
- 8885 Sette, the asteroid Sette, the 8885th one registered
- Sette Sale, Oppian Hill, Rome, Italy; a set of cisterns

== Other uses ==
- SETTE, the NATO phonetic alphabet representation of "7", from the Italian word for seven
- Sette (Claudia Leitte EP), a 2014 extended-play recording by the Brazilian recording artist Claudia Leitte
- Sette (magazine), an Italian magazine also known as Corriere della Sera Sette
- NOAAS Oscar Elton Sette (R 335), a U.S. National Oceanic and Atmospheric Administration research ship in commission since 2003 that previously served in the United States Navy as USNS Adventurous (T-AGOS-13) from 1988 to 1992

== See also ==
- Sette Bello, American Thoroughbred racehorse
- Setté Cama, a village in Gabon
- Setté Cama Airport, an airport in Gabon
- Setté Cama Hunting Area, a protected area in Gabon
- Sette e mezzo, an Italian card game
- Sette giorni all'altro mondo, 1936 Italian comedy film
- Sette Giugno (7th of June), Maltese national holiday
- Sette note in nero, a 1977 Italian giallo film
- Sette scialli di seta gialla, a 1972 Italian giallo film
- Seven (disambiguation), which is Italian: Sette for "7"
- Sett (disambiguation)
- Sete (disambiguation)
- Seti (disambiguation)
- Set (disambiguation)
