= Seth (surname) =

Seth is a surname as well as a first name.

== Surname ==
=== Indian surname ===
A common Indian surname with variations Sheth, and Sethi.

- Aftab Seth (born 1943), Indian diplomat and former ambassador of India to Greece, Vietnam and Japan
- Ajit Seth (born 1951), Indian bureaucrat
- Ashok Seth (born 1954), Indian interventional cardiologist
- Bishanchander Seth, Indian politician
- Chinubhai Chimanlal Seth (1901–1993), Indian industrialist and cotton textile mill owner
- Deeksha Seth (born 1990), Indian film actress and model
- Divya Seth, Indian film and television actress
- Faiza Seth (born 1977), India-born American founder of Casa Forma/London design firm
- Jagat Seths, a rich business, banking and money lender family
- James Seth (bishop) (1913–1975), Anglican bishop in Madagascar
- Karnika Seth (born 1976), Indian lawyer
- Kanishk Seth (born 1995), Indian composer, singer and songwriter
- Kavita Seth (born 1970), Indian playback singer in Hindi cinema and live performer
- Kiran Seth (born 1949), Indian academician
- Krishna Mohan Seth (born 1939), Indian general and governor
- Lakshman Chandra Seth (born 1940), Indian politician from Tamluk, West Bengal
- Leila Seth (1930–2017), Indian judge, the first woman judge of the Delhi High Court
- Mesrovb Jacob Seth (1871–1939), Indian historian and school master of Classical Armenian
- Mira Seth, Indian civil servant, diplomat, former Chairman of UNICEF
- Philipa Seth (born 1994), Australian rules footballer
- Pradeep Seth, Indian virologist, developer and self-tester of a purported vaccine for HIV
- Priya Seth (born 1957), Indian cinematographer
- Raghunath Seth (1931–2014), Pandit, Indian exponent of Hindustani classical music
- Rahul Seth (born 1977), Indian voice actor, dubbing artist, R&B-singer-songwriter
- Rajan Seth (born 1952), Indian cricket umpire
- Rajiv Seth (born 1968), Indian former cricketer
- Rohan Seth, co-founder of social audio app Clubhouse
- Roshan Seth (born 1942), Indian actor
- Samarth Seth (born 1999), Indian cricketer
- Sanjay Seth (born 1959), Indian politician
- Sanjay Seth (born 1961), Indian politician and businessman
- Sanjay Kumar Seth (1957–2021), Indian Judge and Chief justice of Madhya Pradesh High Court
- Sanjeev Seth (born 1961), Indian TV actor
- Shashi Kant Seth (born 1931), Indian Judge and Chief Justice of the Himachal Pradesh High Court
- Shruti Seth (born 1977), Indian actress
- Simeon Seth, 11th-century Byzantine scholar and Grand Chamberlain under Emperor Michael VII Doukas
- Soumya Seth (born 1989k, Indian television actress
- Suhel Seth (born 1963), Indian businessman, co-founder and managing partner of the consultancy firm Counselage India
- Sunil Seth (born 1990), Guyanese squash player
- Sushma Seth (born 1936), Indian stage, film and television actress
- Vatsal Seth (born 1980), Indian actor
- Vikram Seth (born 1952), Indian writer
- Waqar Ahmed Seth (1961–2020), Pakistani judge and Chief Justice of Peshawar High Court

=== European surname ===
- Anil Seth, British professor of Cognitive and Computational Neuroscience
- Asha Seth (born 1939), Canadian politician and doctor
- Bruce Seth Green, American television director
- Cameron Seth (born 1994), Canadian squash player
- Catriona Seth (born 1964), British scholar of French literature
- David Seth Kotkin (born 1956), American magician
- David Seth-Smith (1875–1963), British zoologist, wildlife artist and broadcaster
- Daniel Seth Loeb (born 1961), American investor, hedge fund manager, and philanthropist
- David Seth Doggett (1810–1880), American Bishop of the Methodist Episcopal Church
- Derek Seth-Smith (1920–1964), English first-class cricketer
- Henriett Seth F. (born 1980), Hungarian autistic savant poet
- Henry Seth, New York City Ballet dancer
- Iqbal Seth, Indian cricketer
- James Seth (1860–1925), Scottish philosopher
- Joseph B. Seth (1845–1927), American politician and businessman
- Joshua Seth (born 1970), American actor
- Lancelot Seth Ward (1875–1929), English commander of the First Battalion of the King's African Rifles
- Leslie Seth-Smith, (1923–2007), English screenwriter and biographer
- Martin Seth Kramer (born 1954), American-Israeli scholar of Islam and Arab politics
- Michael Seth Silverman, Canadian specialist in HIV/AIDS and infectious disease
- Mike Seth (born 1987), American soccer player
- Oliver Seth (1915–1996), American judge
- Reidun Seth (born 1966), Norwegian football player and medallist
- Reva Seth, Canadian journalist and strategic communications consultant
- Sunil Seth (born 1990), English-born Guyanese squash player
- Torgil von Seth (1895–1989), Swedish right-wing politician
- William Seth Agar (1815–1872), English Catholic canon
- William Seth Lampe (1906–1992), American journalist and former managing editor of the Detroit Times

== See also ==
- Sethi
- Sethia (surname)
- Sheth
