= Sheehy =

Sheehy is an Irish surname, derived from the Gaelic "Mac Sithigh," which is probably derived from "sithigh," meaning "peace."

Notable people with the surname include:

== Politicians ==
- David Sheehy, 19th-century Irish nationalist politician
- Gerry Sheehy (1924–2009), Canadian politician
- Mary Sheehy Moe, Democratic member of the Montana Legislature
- Maurie Sheehy, (1893–1961), Australian politician
- Michael Sheehy, Democratic member of the Ohio House of Representatives
- Paul J. Sheehy, American politician
- Rick Sheehy, former Nebraska lieutenant governor
- Thomas Sheehy (1899–1984), Labor member of the Australian House of Representatives
- Timothy Sheehy (Cork politician), Irish politician
- Timothy Sheehy (Tipperary politician), Irish politician
- Tim Sheehy, United States senator from Montana

== Sports ==
- Ciara Sheehy (born 1980), Irish 200m sprinter
- Joan McSheehy (1913–1948), American swimmer
- John Joe Sheehy (1897–1980), Irish political/military activist and sportsperson
- Kathy Sheehy (born 1970), American water polo player
- Mikey Sheehy, Gaelic footballer
- Neil Sheehy, retired American ice hockey player
- Niall Sheehy, Irish Gaelic footballer
- Noel Sheehy, Irish hurling
- Paudie Sheehy, Gaelic footballer
- Paul Sheehy, American rugby player
- Seán Óg Sheehy (1939–2024), Irish former Gaelic footballer
- Sean Sheehy (1951–2025), Irish soccer player
- Timothy Sheehy (ice hockey), retired ice hockey player
- Damon Sheehy-Guiseppi (born 1995), American football player

== Activists ==
- Nicholas Sheehy, 18th-century Irish Catholic priest and opponent of the Penal Laws
- Eugene Sheehy (priest), 19th-century Irish nationalist priest
- Francis Sheehy-Skeffington, born Francis Skeffington (1878–1916), Irish writer and political activist, husband of Hanna Sheehy-Skeffington
- Hanna Sheehy-Skeffington, born Hanna Sheehy (1877–1946), Irish nationalist and women's activist, wife of Francis Sheehy-Skeffington
- Owen Sheehy-Skeffington (1909–1970), Irish university lecturer and Senator, son of Francis and Hanna Sheehy-Skeffington

== Business ==
- Eugene Sheehy (banker), group chief executive of Allied Irish Banks Plc
- Sir Christopher Sheehy OBE (1894–1960), Australian dairy industry administrator
- Sir Patrick Sheehy (1930–2019), British businessman
- Tim Sheehy (born 1985), founder of Bridger Aerospace

== Writers ==
- Gail Sheehy, (1937–2020), American author
- Eugene P. Sheehy, retired academic librarian, professional researcher, author and editor

== Judges ==
- The Honourable Sir Joseph Sheehy KBE, (1900–1971), Australian jurist and Supreme Court Justice
- Joseph Warren Sheehy, (1910–1967), United States federal judge

== Other ==
- Brett Sheehy AO, (born 1958), Australian artistic director, producer and curator
- Lieutenant General Sir Henry Sheehy Keating KCB (1775–1847), officer of the British Army during the French Revolutionary and Napoleonic Wars
- Jeremy Sheehy (born 1956), British Anglican priest and academic
- John Sheehy (administrator) (1889–1949), British colonial official
- John Sheehy (architect) (born 1942), internationally known American architect
- Suzie Sheehy, Australian accelerator physicist and science communicator

== Fictional characters ==
- Father Sheehy, the liberal catholic priest, played by Tony Doyle (actor), in the Irish TV drama The Riordans
- Francis Sheehy-Skeffington, an Irish drug trafficker played by Liam Cunningham in the 2011 film The Guard
