= Karekar =

Daivajnan surname

Karekar is one of the common surnames of the Daivadnya Brahmin community, predominantly residing in Goa, some parts of Karnataka and Maharashtra. They originally hail from Caraim, a village on Chorão island in coastal Indian state of Goa. They belong to various brahminical Gotras (Bharadwaja, Kashyapa, Kaushika, Shandilya, Sauparna) and use different surnames and titles and worship Gajantalakshmi Ravalanatha in the village of Mashel, in Goa as their Tutelary deity. Historically many of them were wealthy merchants who formed themselves into guilds or Shreni, and also functioned as Mahajans (money lenders, patrons of the temples etc.) and Ganvkars of the Ganvkari system.

== See also ==
- Ravalnath
- Shett
- Goykanadi
- Tiswadi
- Chorão
- Brahmins of Maharashtra
