= Sethia (surname) =

Sethia or Setia is an Indian surname. Notable people with the surname include:

- Babulal Sethia (born 1951), British-Indian cardiac surgeon
- Kanhaiyalal Sethia (1919–2008), Indian poet
- Shirley Setia, Indian-born singer and actress

== See also ==
- Sethi
- Seth (surname)
- Sheth
