= Sethi =

Sethi (sometimes spelled Seth) is an Indian surname.

== Notable people ==
- Abhimanyu Sethi, Indian politician
- Akshay Sethi (born 1980), Indian television actor
- Aman Sethi (born 1983), Indian journalist and writer
- Amisha Sethi (born 1980), Indian actress and model
- Ali Sethi (born 1984), Pakistani singer and author
- Ehsan Elahi Zaheer (1945 - 1987), Pakistani Religious Scholar and Author
- Ananta Prasad Sethi (born 1951), Indian politician
- Anita Sethi, British journalist and writer
- Arjun Sethi (born 1983), Indian American entrepreneur, investor and executive
- Arjun Charan Sethi (1941–2020), Indian politician
- Arjun Singh Sethi (born 1981), Indian American civil rights writer and lawyer
- Arya Sethi (born 2001), Indian cricketer
- Avimanyu Sethi (born 1970), Indian politician
- Bishnu Sethi (1961–2022), Indian politician
- Deepak Sethi, Canadian-American screenwriter, comedian, director and voice actor
- Esha Sethi Thirani (born 1986), Indian fashion designer
- Geet Sethi (born 1961), Indian billiards player
- Hardik Sethi (born 1993), Indian cricketer
- Jagdish Sethi (1903–1969), Indian actor and director
- Jyotii Sethi, Indian actress
- Kamal Kumar Sethi, Indian physician, medical academic and administrator
- Kiran Sethi, Indian police officer
- Krishan Dev Sethi (1928–2021), Indian politician and activist in Kashmir
- Manny Sethi (born 1978), American physician and politician
- Meera Sethi (born 1975), Canadian visual artist
- Minati Sethi (born 1990), Indian weightlifter
- Mira Sethi (born 1987), Pakistani actress
- Muhammad Yaqoob Nadeem Sethi (born 1970), Pakistani politician
- Musskan Sethi, Indian actress
- Najam Sethi (born 1948), Pakistani journalist and former Chief Minister of Punjab Province in Pakistan during a caretaker Government, Chairman of Pakistan Cricket Board in 2022
- Nargis Sethi, Pakistani civil servant and politician
- Pandit Arjun Lal Sethi (1880–1941), Indian freedom fighter, revolutionary and educator
- Phulchand Sethi (1911–1976), Indian businessman, social worker and philanthropist
- Prakash Chandra Sethi (1919–1996), Indian politician
- Prem Gopal "Biloo" Sethi (died 1981), Indian golfer
- Parmeet Sethi, Indian actor
- Prahlad Kumar Sethi, Indian physician and medical writer
- Pramod Karan Sethi (1927–2008), Indian orthopaedic surgeon and coinventor of the Jaipur leg
- Priya Sethi, Indian politician
- Purnima Sethi (1954–2012), Indian politician
- Rajeev Sethi (born 1949), Indian art curator, scenographer and designer
- Raju Sethi (born 1962), Indian cricketer
- Rakesh Sethi, Indian banker
- Rakesh Sethi, Indian celebrity chef and TV figure
- Ram Sethi (born 1938), Indian actor, director and writer
- Ramesh Sethi (born 1941), Kenyan cricketer
- Ramit Sethi (born 1982), American entrepreneur, author and personal finance adviser
- Ram Prakash Sethi (1937–2007), Indian judge
- Ravi Sethi (born 1947), Indian computer scientist
- Ricky J. Sethi, Indian-American computational scientist
- Rinki Sethi, American technology executive
- Roshan Sethi, Canadian physician and film director
- Sajid Mehmood Sethi (born 1968), Pakistani judge
- Sanjay Sethi (born 1972), Indian engineer and entrepreneur
- Sanjit Sethi, American designer, artist and administrator
- Sarmistha Sethi (born 1974), Indian politician
- Shanti Sethi, American naval officer
- Sumit Sethi, Indian music producer, composer, performer and DJ
- Suresh P. Sethi, American mathematician and economist known for the Sethi model
- Surjit Singh Sethi (1928–1995), Indian Punjabi playwright, novelist, short story writer and lyricist
- Vijay Sethi, Indian academic and processor
- Vikas Sethi (1976–2024), Indian actor
- Vikram Sethi, American author and cybersecurity specialist
- Yudhvir Sethi, Indian politician
- Neel Sethi, Indian-American Actor

== See also ==
Similar surnames

- Seti, a spelling variation
- Sethia (surname)
- Seth (surname)
- Sheth

Derived names:

- Sethi model
- Sethi–Ullman algorithm
- Sethi-Skiba point
- Sethi Mohallah, neighborhood in Peshawar
- Sethi Town (Haji Camp), neighborhood in Peshawar
