= Eugene Sheehy =

Eugene Sheehy may refer to:

- Eugene Sheehy (banker) (born 1954), executive with Allied Irish Banks Plc
- Eugene Sheehy (priest) (1841–1917), priest and founder member of the Gaelic Athletic Association
- Eugene P. Sheehy (1922–2013), American academic librarian, researcher, author and editor
