= Shett =

Shett (also spelt as Shet) is a surname and title of the Daivajna subcaste of Konkani people, residing along the coast of the Konkan region in western India. It is also an honorific used by them in Goa, Damaon, Konkan division of Maharashtra, and Kanara subregion of Karnataka.

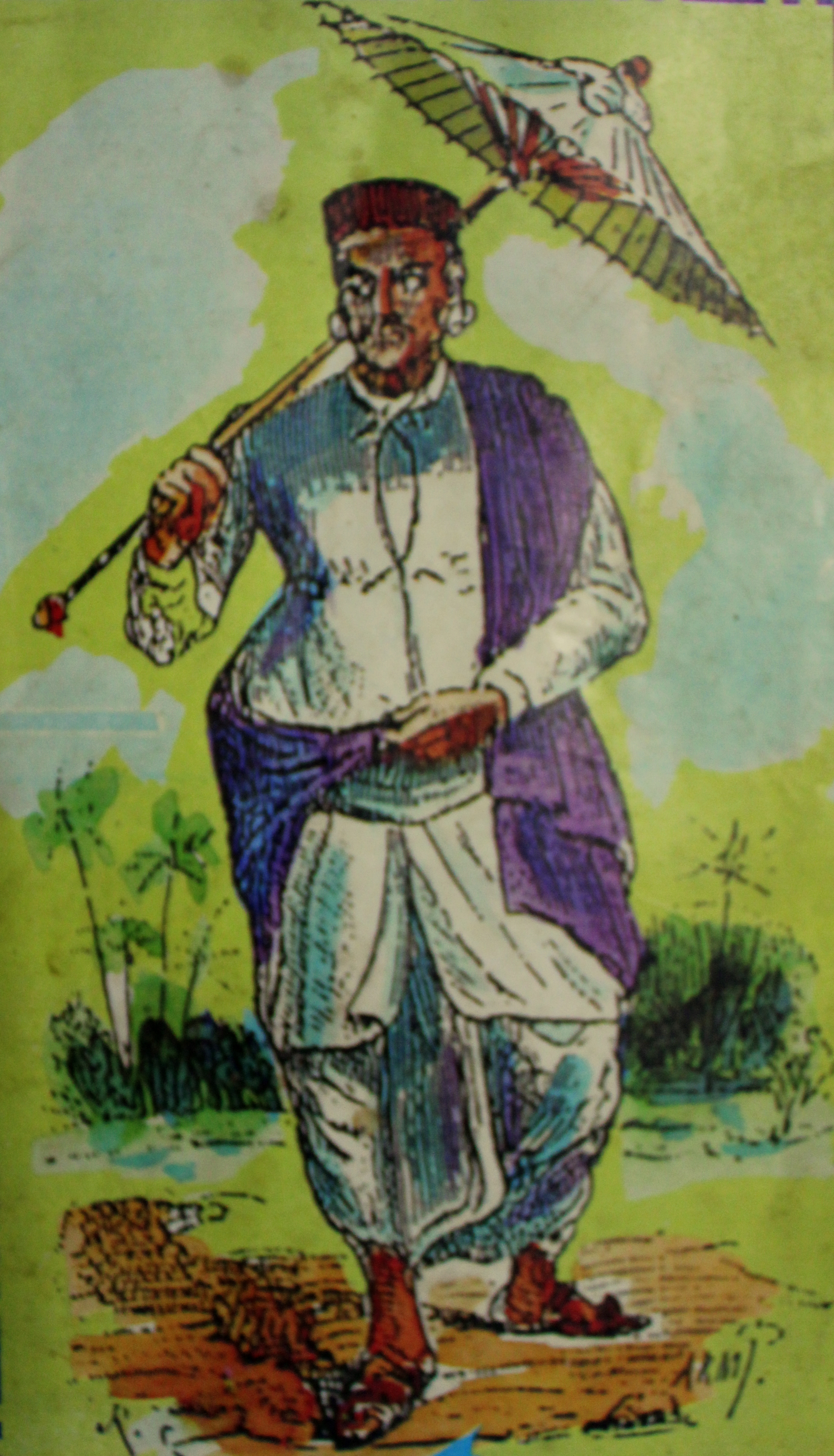
A Shett gentlemen from Goa, late 18th – early 19th century (Courtesy: Gomant Kalika, Nutan Samvatsar Visheshank, April 2002)

== Etymology ==
The word Shett is derived from the Sanskrit word Śreṣṭha (Devanagari: श्रेष्ठ) or Śreṣṭhin (श्रेष्ठीन्, ‘superior’), Prakrit as Seṭhī (सेठी), and then Śeṭ (शेट) or Śeṭī (शेट) in modern Indo-Aryan dialects.

The guilds of the traders, merchants, bankers as well as moneylenders (mahjana), administrators of various institutions and their employees in ancient Goa, like other parts in India, were called śreṇī, and the head of these guilds were called Śreṣṭha or Śreṣṭhīn, which would mean 'His Excellency'.

== Usage ==
Various Romanised versions found during the colonial period include Chatim, Xete, Xetim, Xatim, Chati, Sette etc.

Before the Goa Inquisition, Daivajna men used the titles Sethi, etc. after their first names. e.g. Virupa Chattim, Gana Sethi, etc. The father's name was used as a middle name. The Daivajna diaspora started using village names after their first names to distinguish themselves from other communities. Daivajna people still in Goa continue to use it as an honorific title. Due to various socio-economic reasons, Daivajna people migrated from Goa to other places. Some started using Shet as their surname just to distinguish themselves from others (especially in South Canara, Udupi, Shimoga and in some parts of North Canara.

== Historical references ==
- The earliest reference to the word Shreshthi in Goa is found in a copper plate inscription, dating to the early 4th century. It mentions a certain Aditya Shreshthi of Shiroda, Goa who was head of a guild which was issued by the Bhoja king, Kapalivarman.
- Southern Shilahara copper plates mention Durga Shreshthi and Babbhana Shreshthi as their ministers.
- Names of many traders like Naga Sette, Gomo Sette, and Bhaira Sette have been found in a copper plate dating back to 1348 AD.
- A Kasarpal copper plate dating to 1436 AD mentions Rupa Sheti and his son Lakshmana Sheti, whom a certain Brahmin Nagavdeva donated the village of Varandem (which includes Kasarpal).
- Gana Sethi or Gana Chatim (as his name appears in Indo-Portuguese documents) was an interpreter in the court of the Portuguese in Goa and Bombay.
- Ravala Sethi or Roulu Chatim, a certain merchant of Caraim (name mentioned in 15th-century documents)
- Virupa Sethi in the 16th century, who protested against the Portuguese.

== See also ==
- Shetty
- Sheth
- Sethi
