= Sethi Mohallah =

Sethi Mohallah سیٹھی محلہ
- Neighbourhood
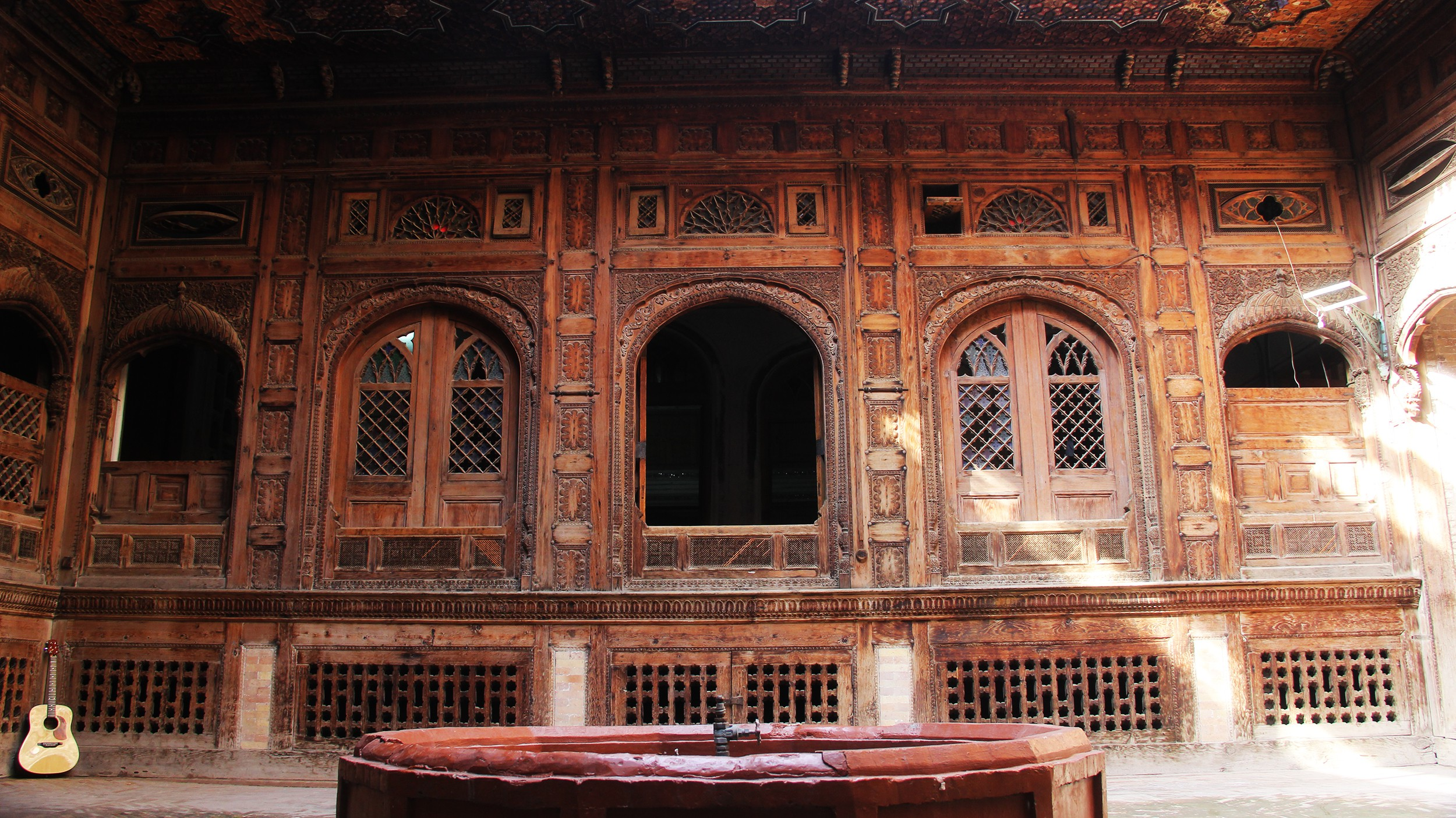
- The Sethi Mohallah is famous for its Central-Asian style homes.
- Interactive map of Sethi Mohallah سیٹھی محلہ
- Country: Pakistan
- Province: Khyber Pakhtunkhwa
- City: Peshawar

Sethi Mohallah (Hindko and Urdu: سیٹھی محلہ), sometimes called Sethian Mohallah and Kucha Sethian, is an old mohallah (traditional neighbourhood) in the walled city of Peshawar, Pakistan. The neighbourhood contains seven surviving havelis (mansions) built by the Sethi family in a style reminiscent of Central Asia with elaborate wooden carvings. The houses were built over a period of one century, from c. 1800 – 1910.

== Background ==
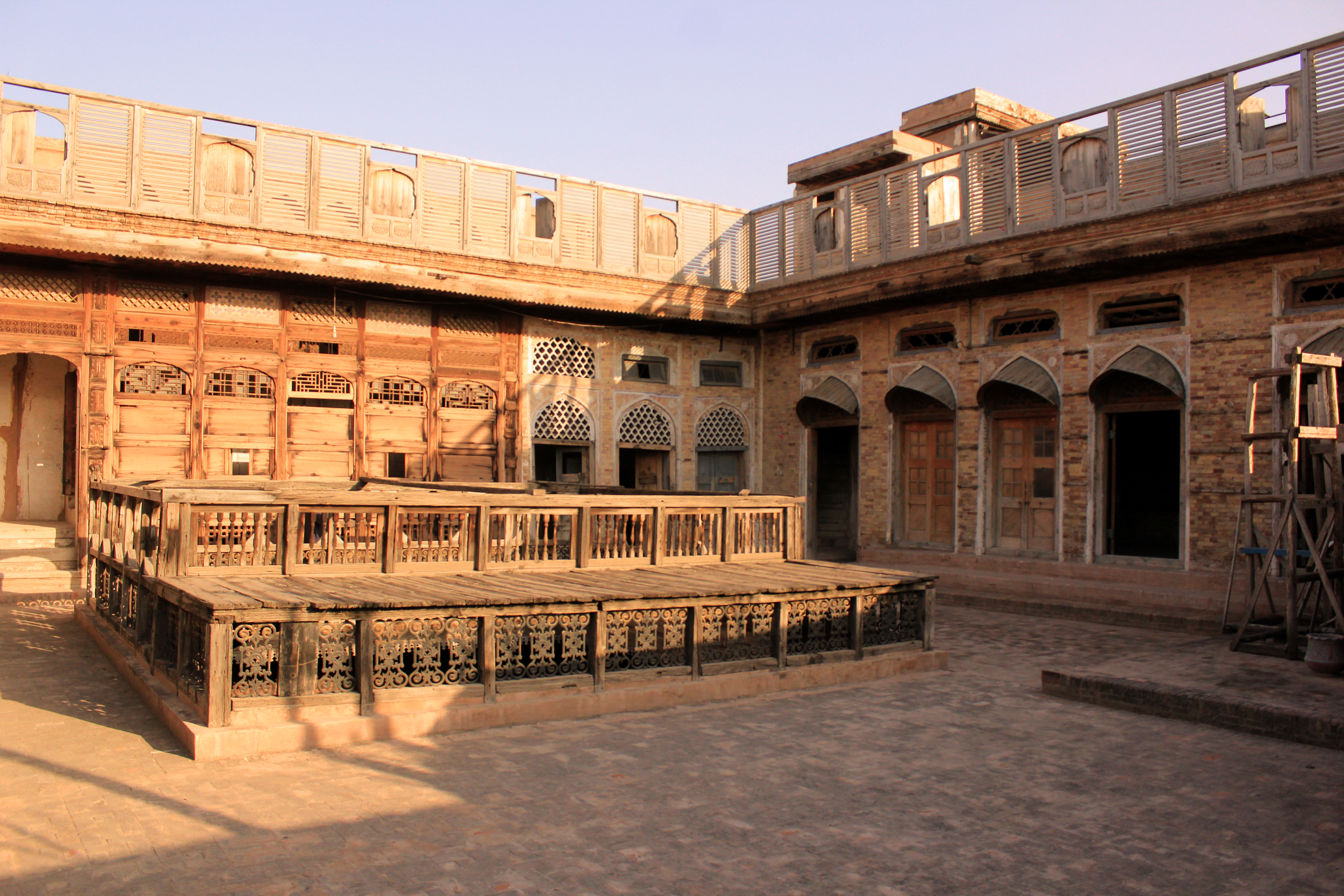
A view of one of the Sethi Mohallah's courtyards

The Sethis were a prominent Punjabi Muslim merchant family with origins in the city of Bhera, in Punjab. From Bhera Sethis primarily exported indigo to central Asia. In 1660, Mian Hafiz Ghulam Ahmad, the patriarch of the family, moved to Chamkani, a town near Peshawar, to expand the family trade. His son Hafiz Fazal Ahmad moved to Peshawar in 1730. In the following decades the Sethis were firmly established in the city. Over time Sethis became very prosperous, trading not only in indigo but also in wood, fur, cotton cloth, copperware, salt, spices, porcelain, carpets and gold thread. They relied on local as well as international trade – their connections went as far as Russia and Central Asia. The Sethi family was involved in considerable welfare work in Peshawar and had contributed to the construction of wells for the poor, along with the Lady Reading Hospital and the Islamia College Mosque.

The Sethi family shifted to Mohalla Sethian in the early 19th century, and in the following decades built a series of havelis. The downfall of the Sethis began during the Russian Revolution in 1917, when their businesses experienced setbacks from which they never recovered, forcing them to leave Central Asia and return to Peshawar.

== Location ==
It is situated close to the Ghanta Ghar (clock tower), Bazaar Kalan and Gor Khuttree in Peshawar's old walled city.

== Design ==
The homes were designed with inspiration from the vernacular architecture of Bukhara. Two neatly decorated tehkhanas (basement rooms), a balakhana (upper storey), dalaans (big halls), chinikhanas (rooms where decoration and art pieces are displayed on chimneypieces) and fountains can be found in each house. The ceilings are painted and the walls are decorated with mirror work. One of the houses has been purchased by the NWFP government, this house has two portions, one for men and one for women. The overall structure is a combination of brick and woodwork embellished with carved wooden doors and balconies. Painted and mirrored atriums provide fresh air and attractive views, while the main entrances are made of superbly carved wood.

It has 12 rooms and four basements and includes a fountain. Colourful glass ceilings with geometrical designs, woodwork with engravings of various splendid designs on walls, a big resting place, made of wood and called Takht-e-Sulaimani, to take sunshine in winter, beautiful ventilators, slanting window-shades, wooden wall cupboards, chimneys and red bricks stairs with projected wooden frames are some of the prominent features of the house.

== List of Havelis ==
The Sethi family built twelve havelis from the early 19th century to 1910, out of which seven survive today with some modifications:

- Muhammad Akram house (early 1800s), now demolished
- Karam Buksh Sethi haveli (1808–1814), earliest surviving mansion
- Fateh Gul Sethi haveli (1810–1818)
- Ahmad Gul haveli (1823–1830s)
- Elahi Buksh Sethi haveli (1832–1840s), demolished in 1970s
- Haji Saeed Ahmad Sethi haveli (1850s), demolished in 1980s
- Shahzada Sultan Sakindar sadozai Sakindar Manzil(1880)
- Shahzada Jalaluddin Sadozai Haveli (1884)
- Karim Buksh Sethi haveli (1889–1901)
- Abdul Rahim Sethi haveli (1890–1896)
- Fateh Gul Sethi's grandson haveli (1890s), demolished in 1980s
- Abdur Karim Sethi haveli (1901–1905)
- Haveli of the Fateh Gul family (1900s), demolished in 1950s
- Abdul Jalil Sethi haveli (1904–1910)

== Gallery ==
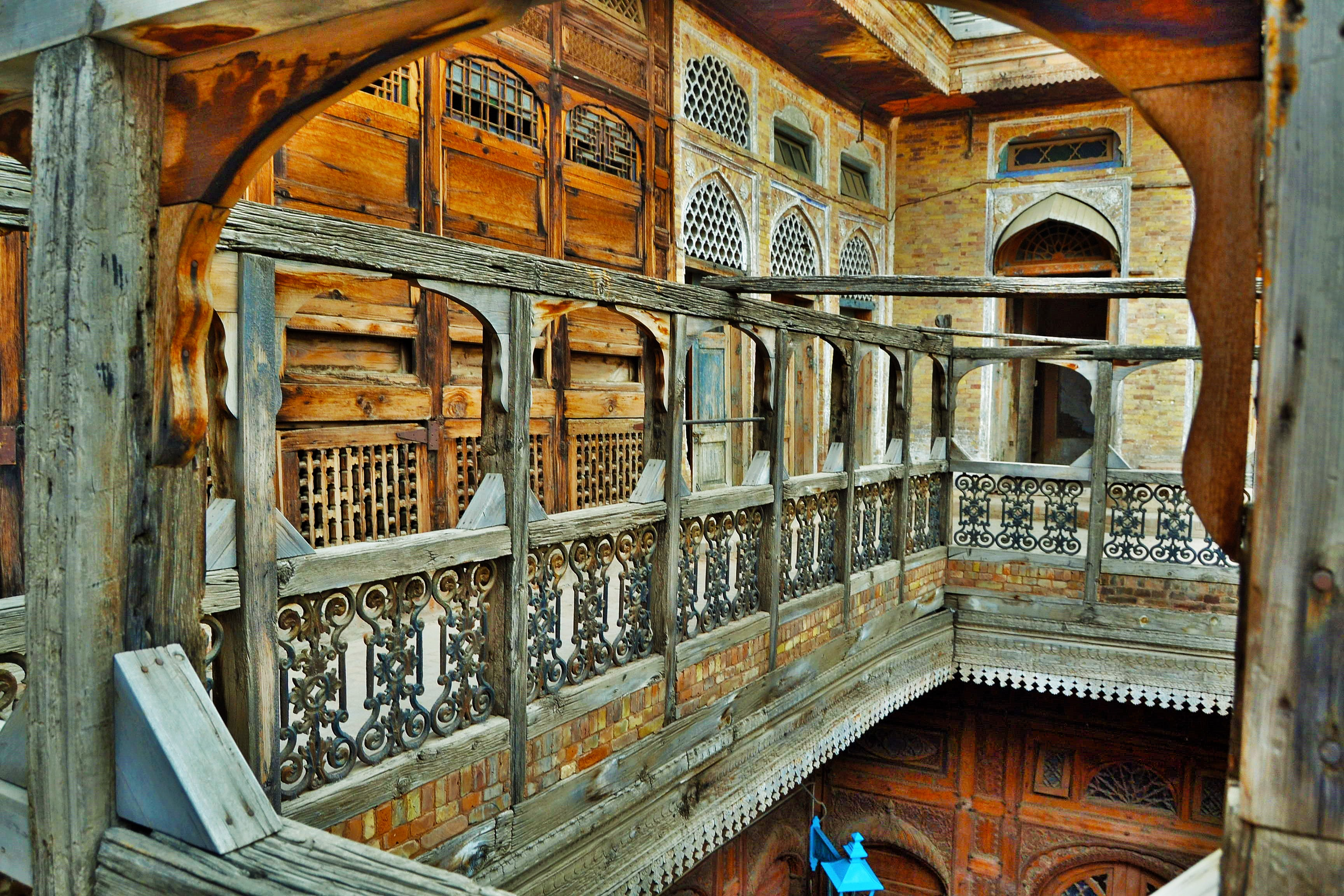

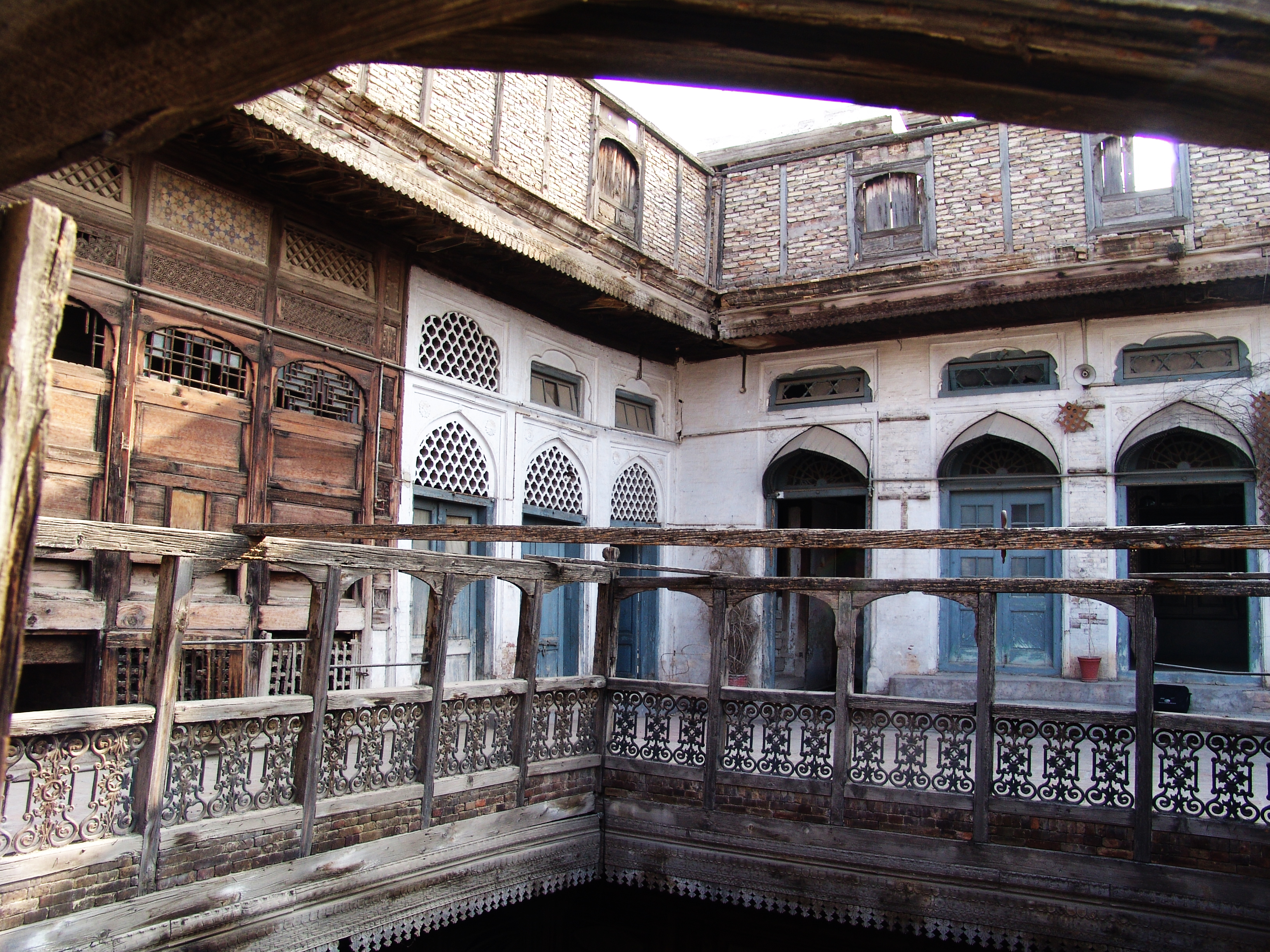
Most homes contain an inner courtyard.

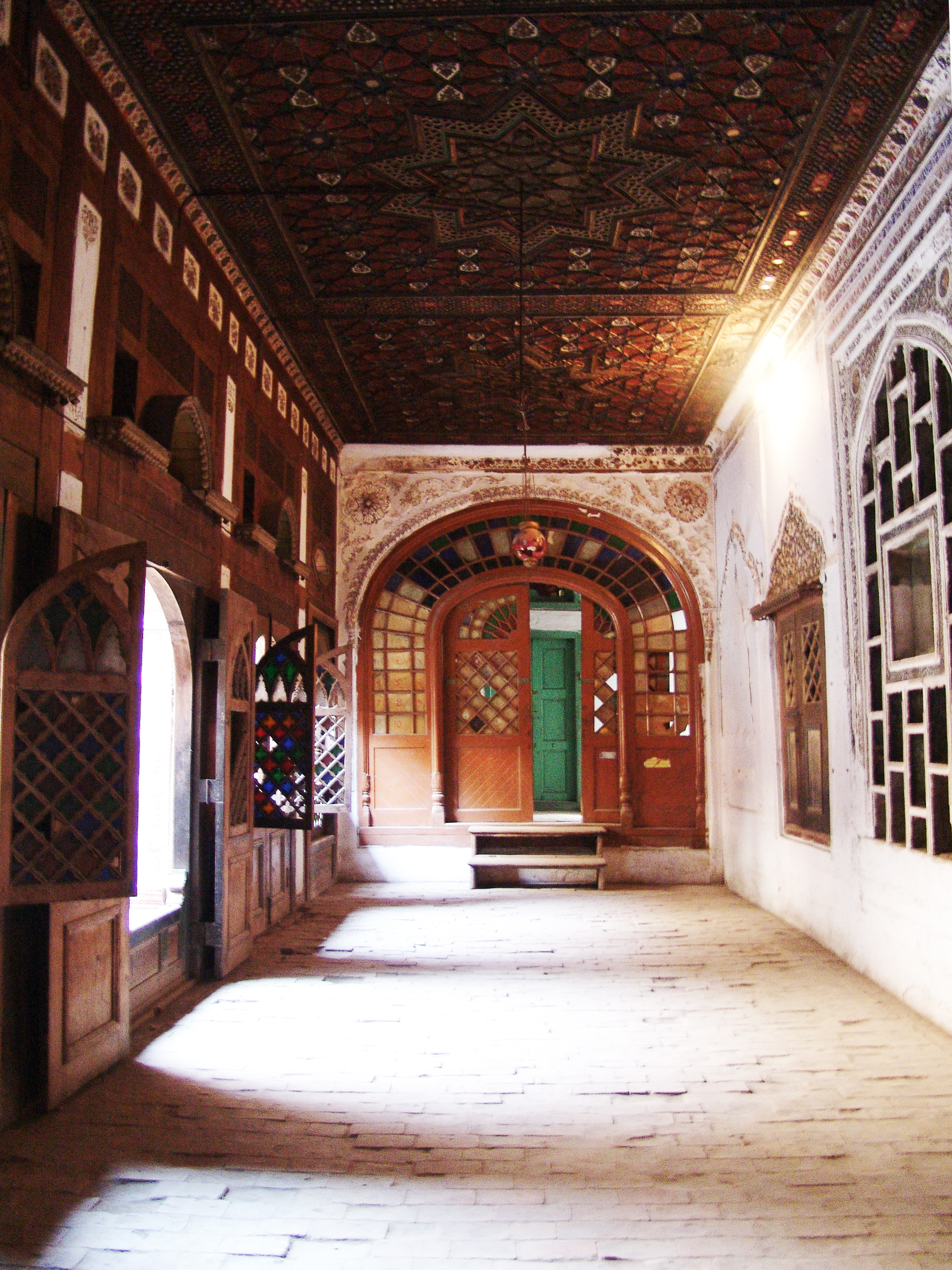
Some of the homes are open to visitors.

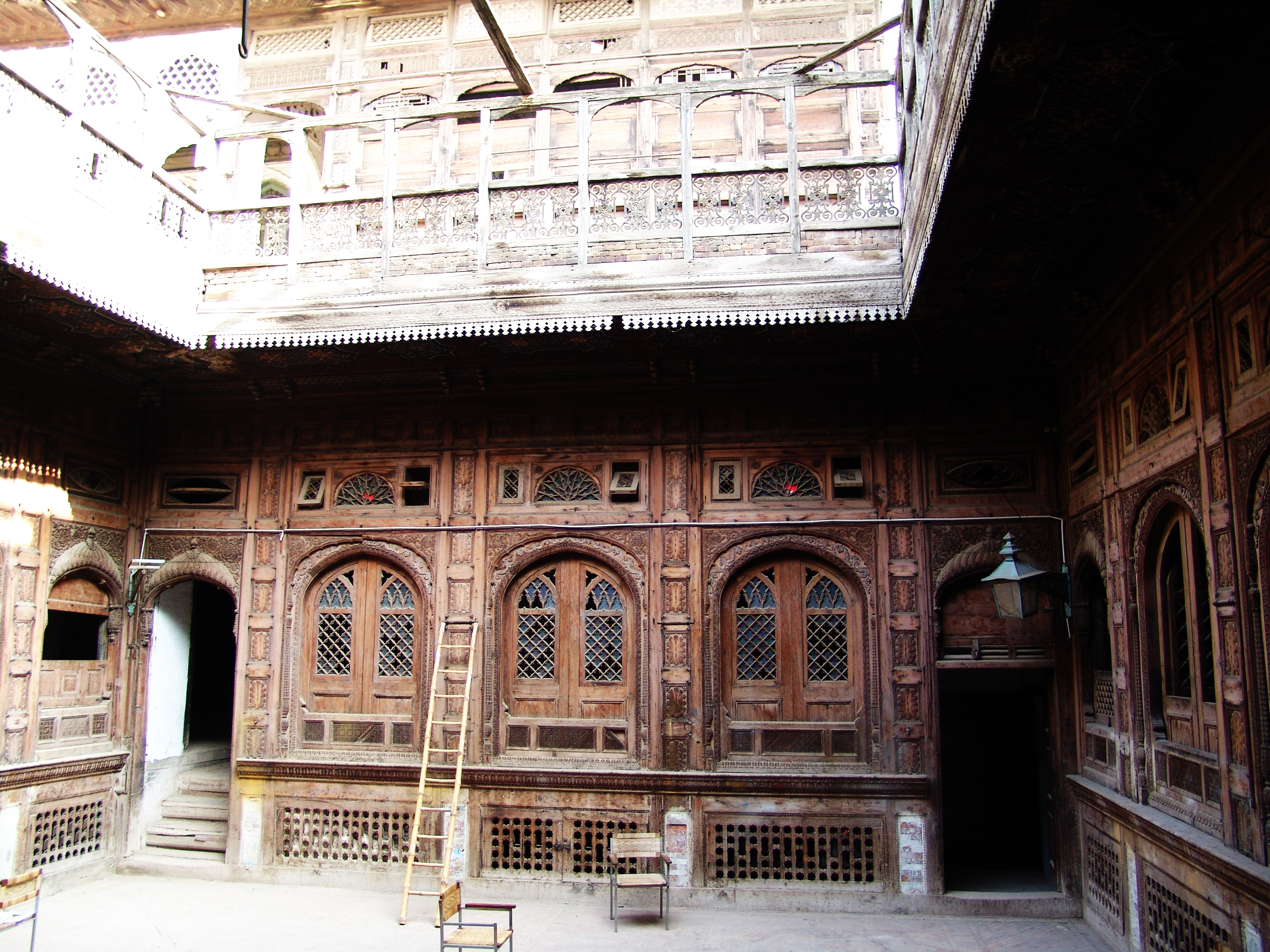
A view of the courtyard of a home in Sethi Mohallah

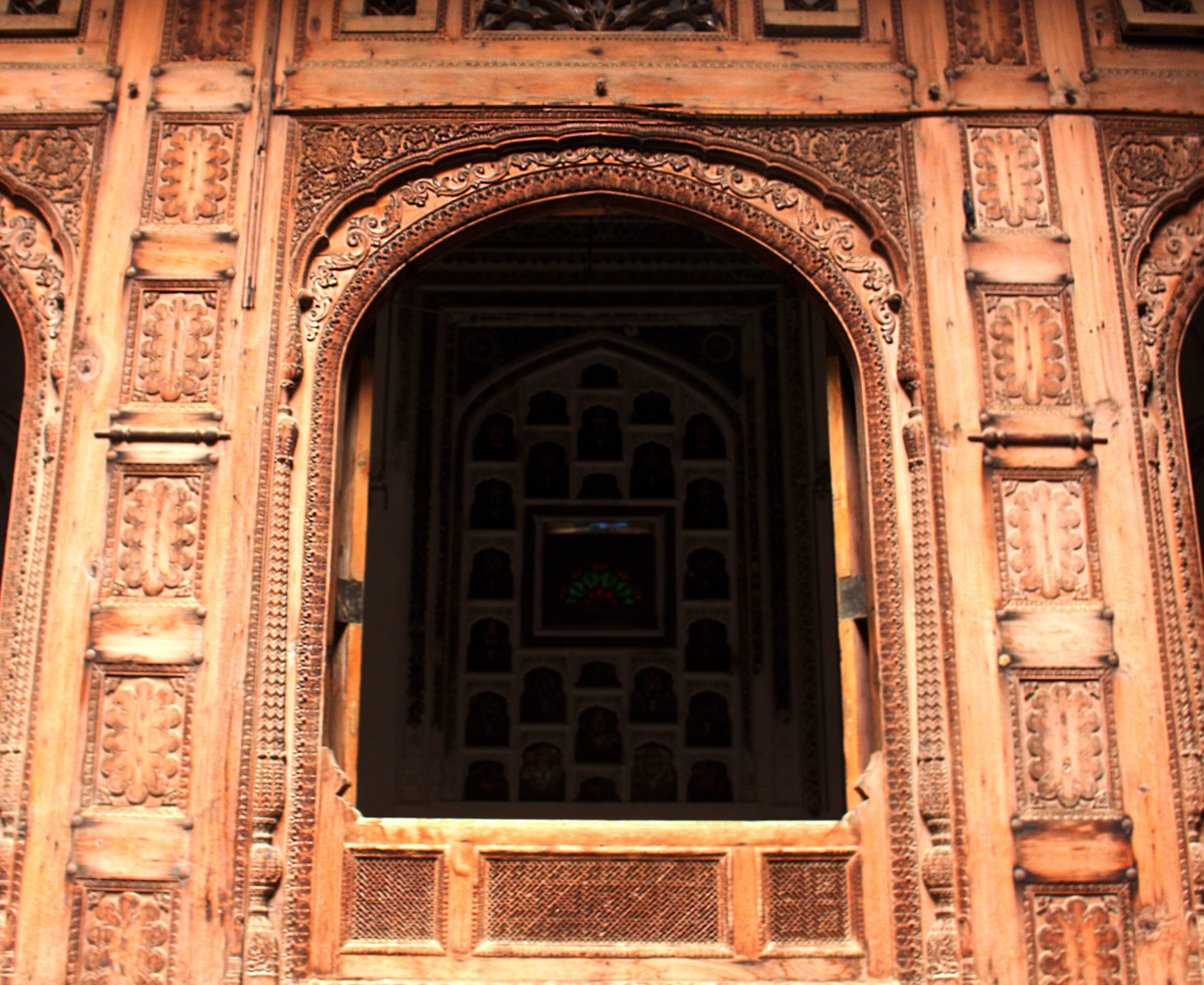
The mohallah is known for the intricate wood-carvings that decorate its homes.

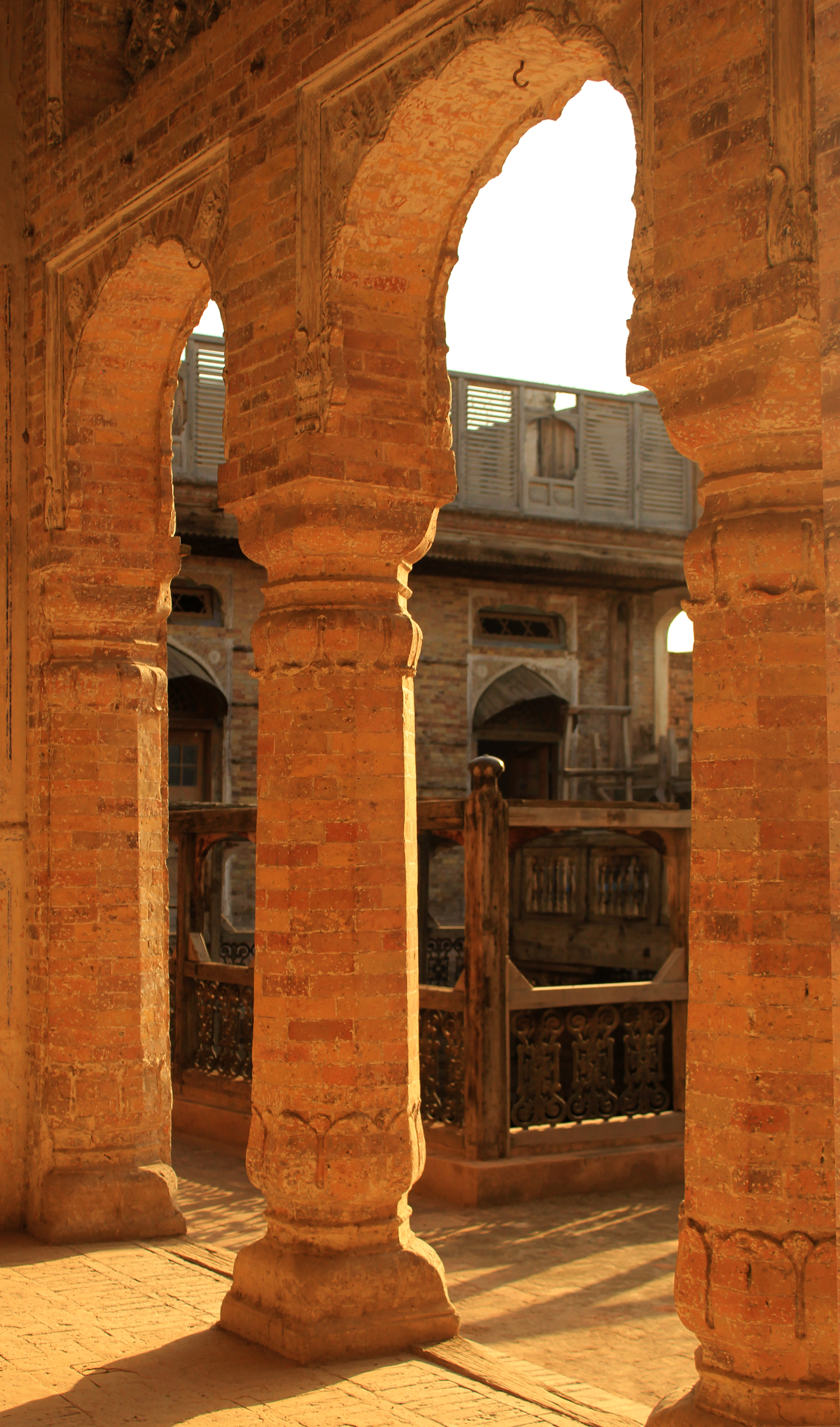
Some homes feature brick pillars.

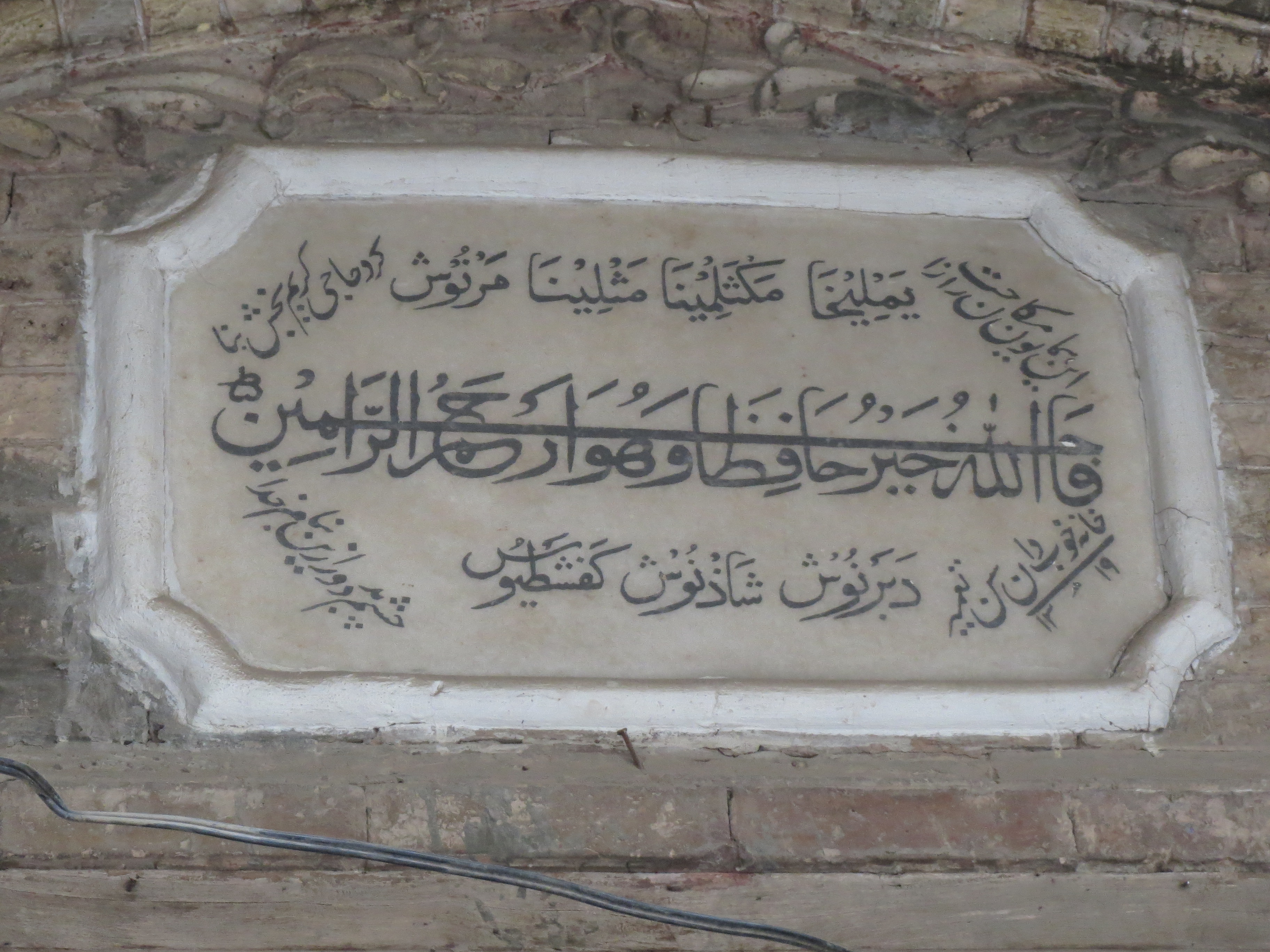
A plaque with religious verses at one of the homes

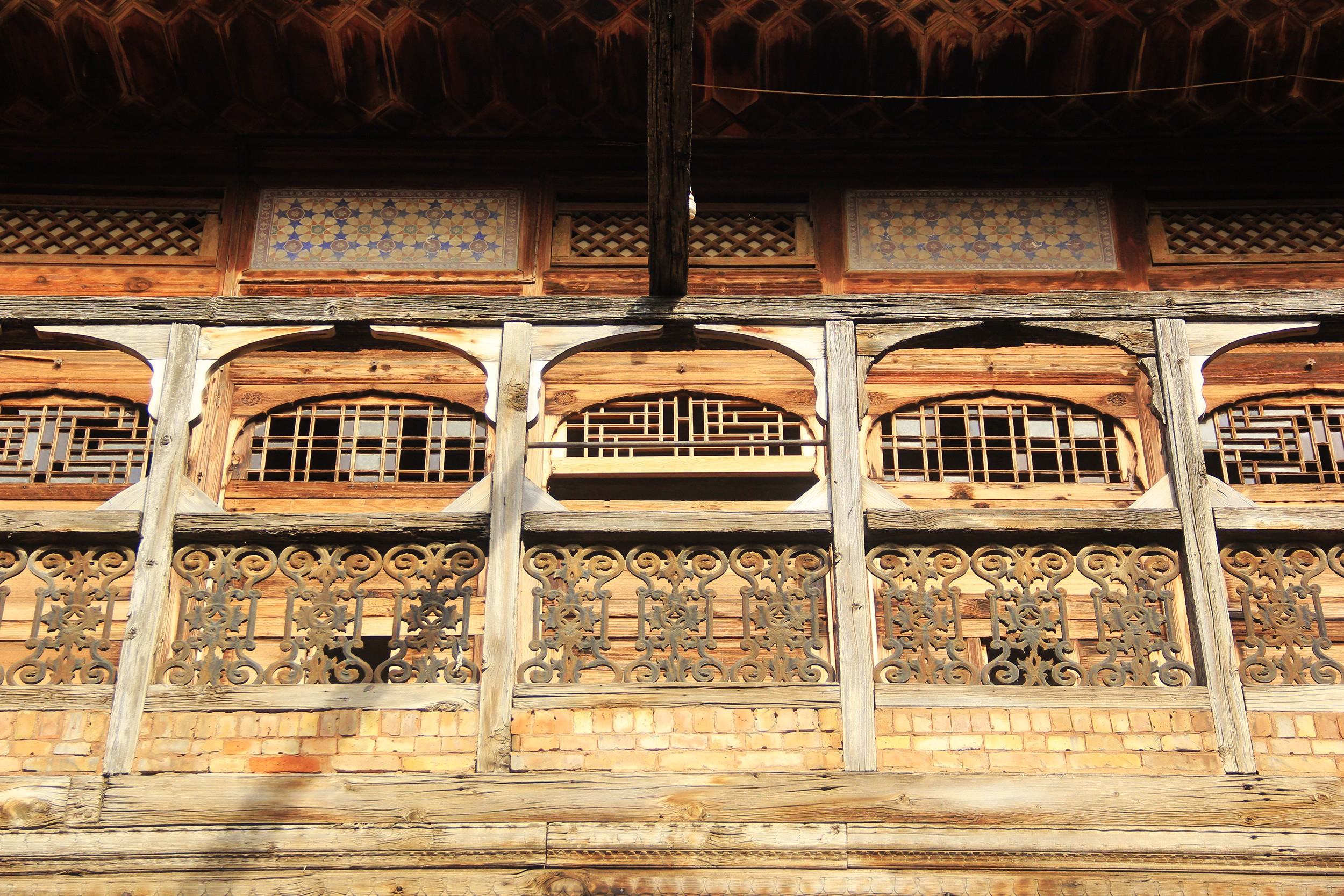
The view of a home's second floor

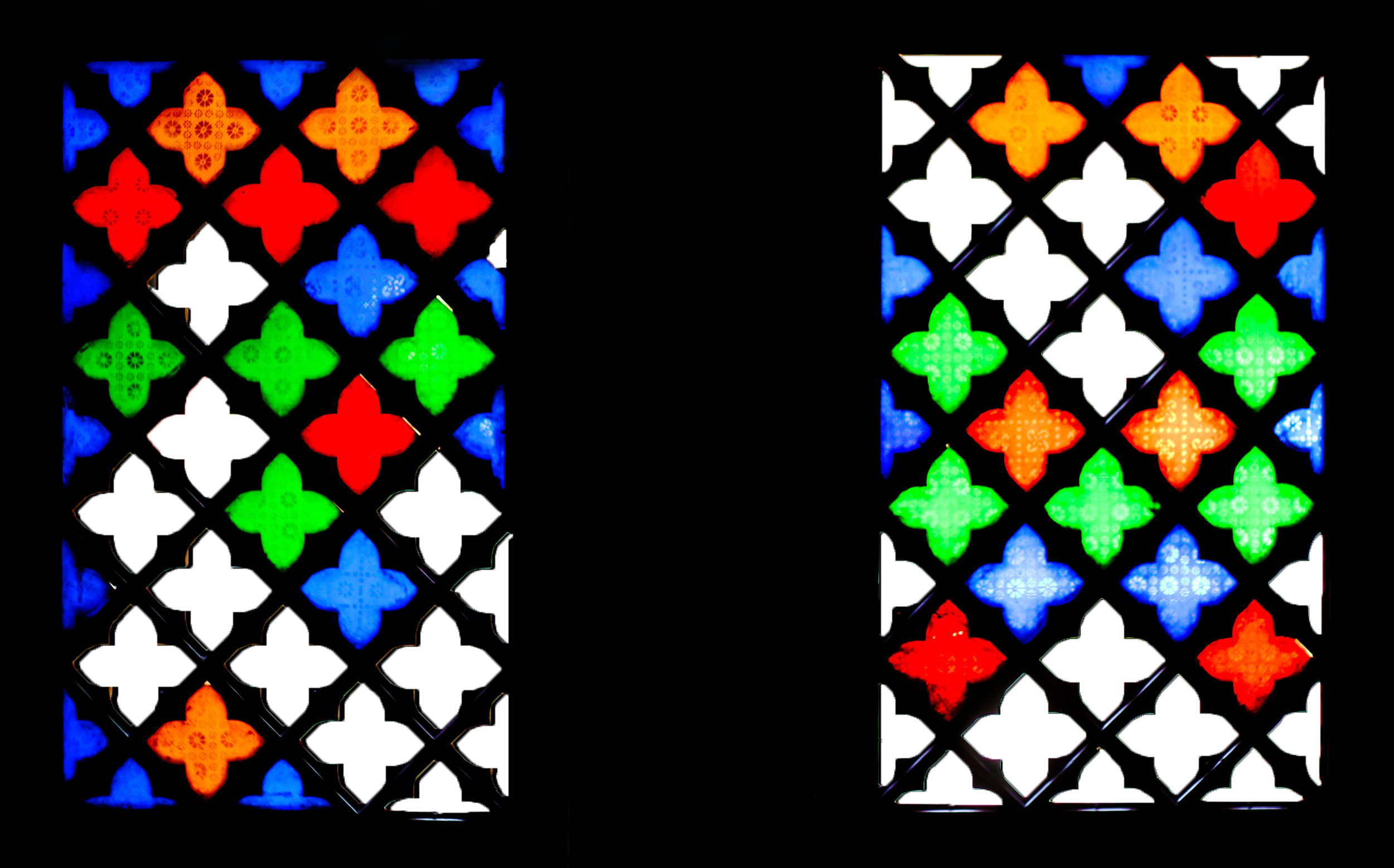
Some homes feature stained-glass windows.

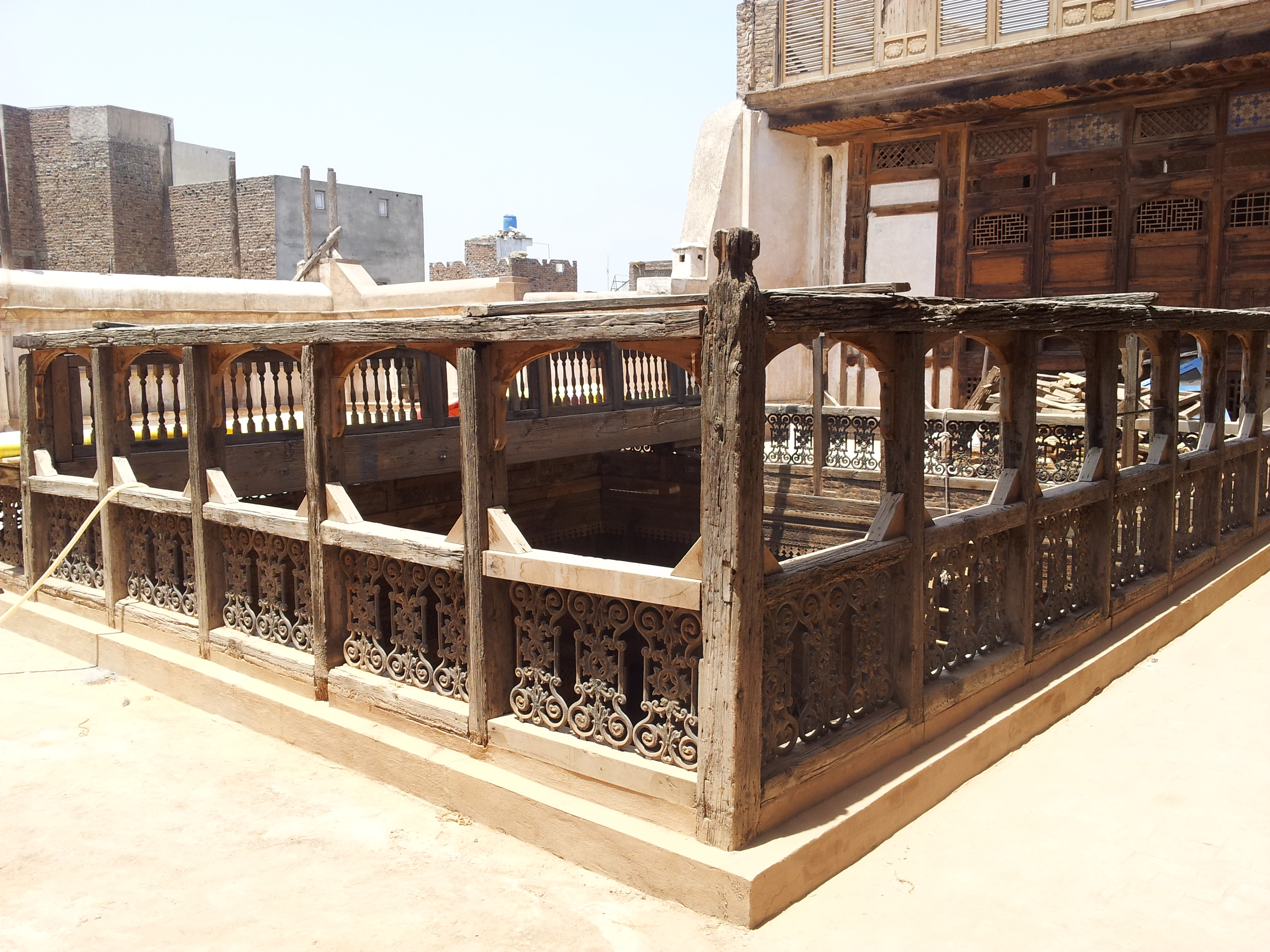
Wooden railings on a rooftop

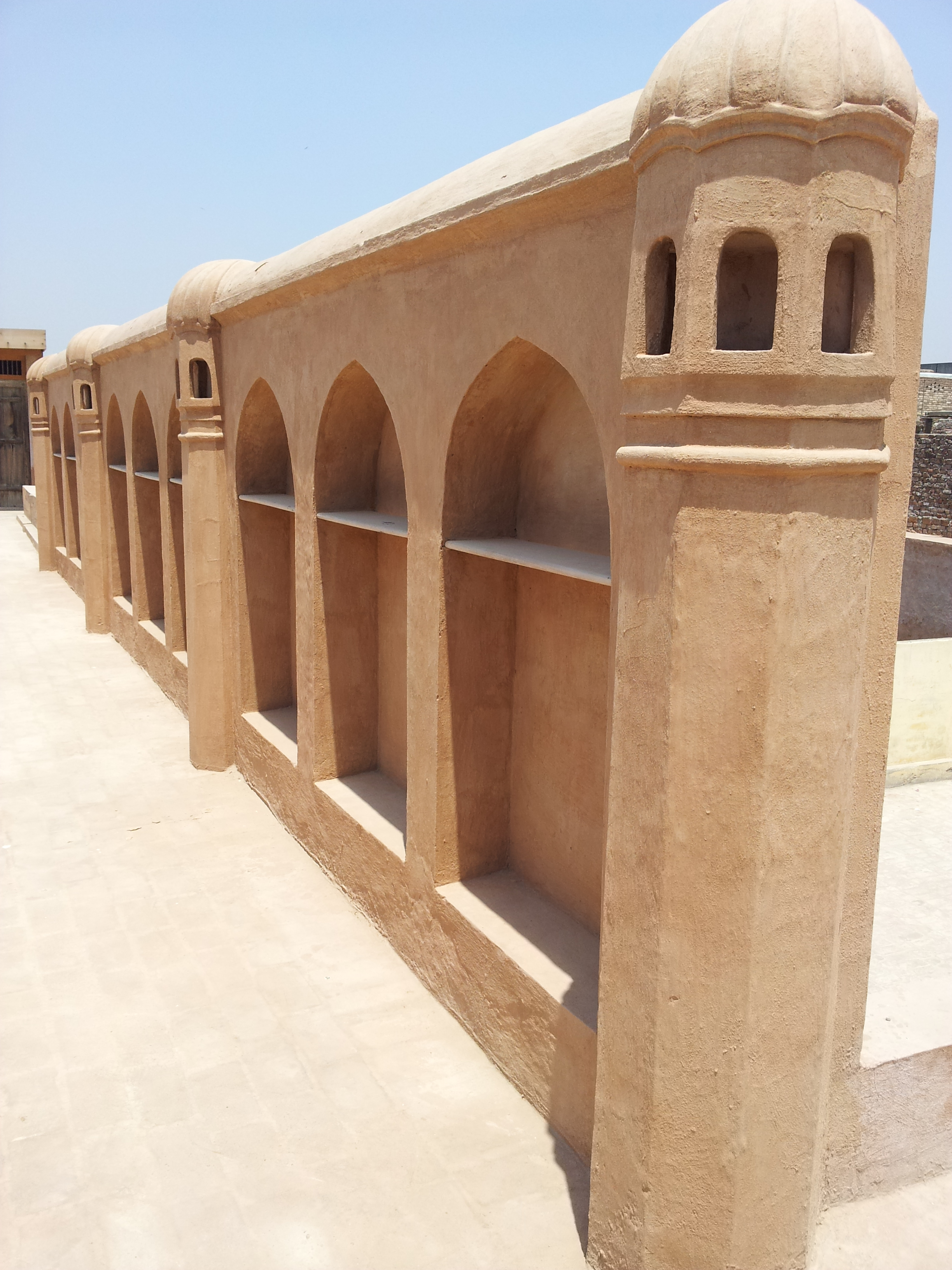
Carved niches on a rooftop

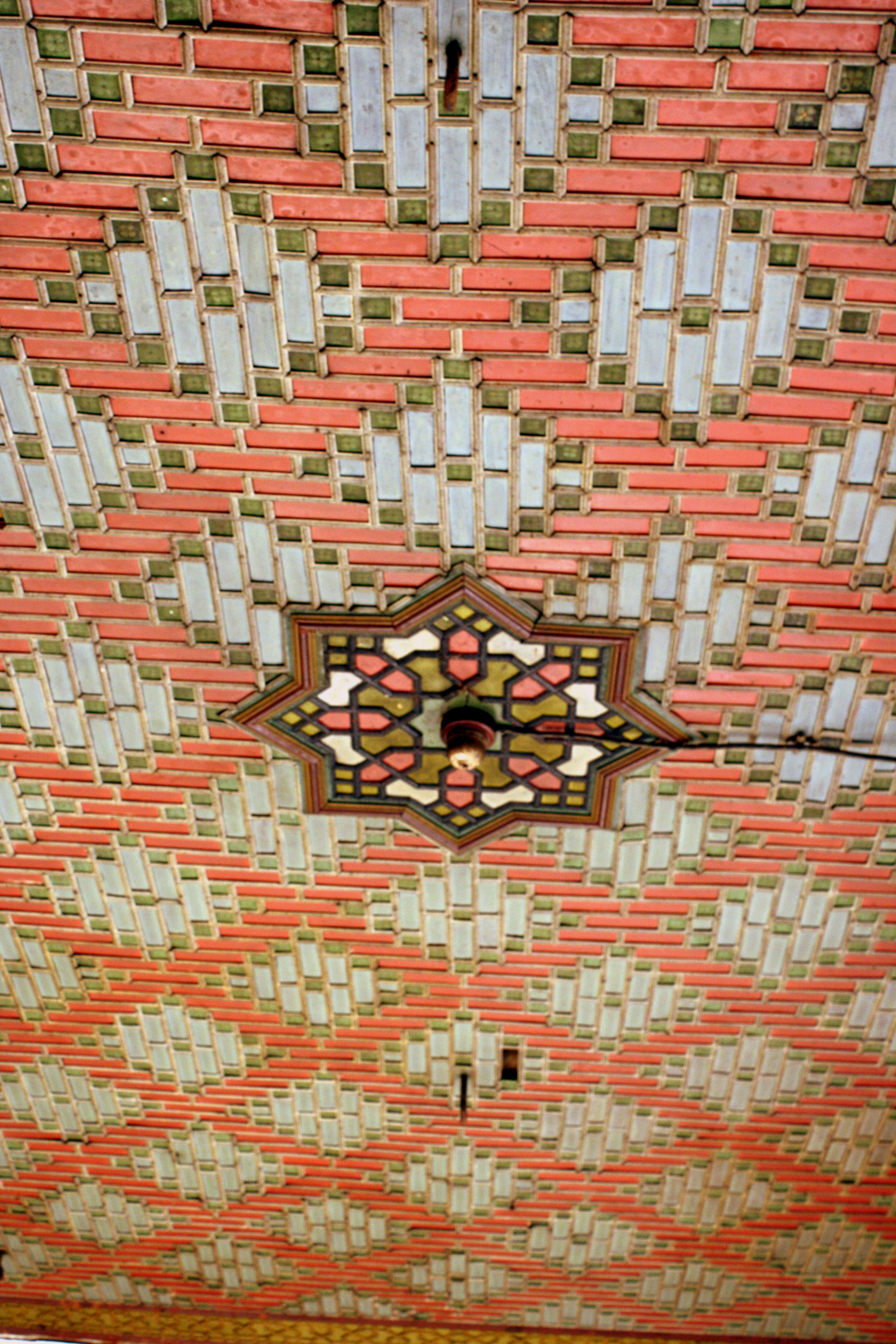
Ceilings in the homes are also decorated.

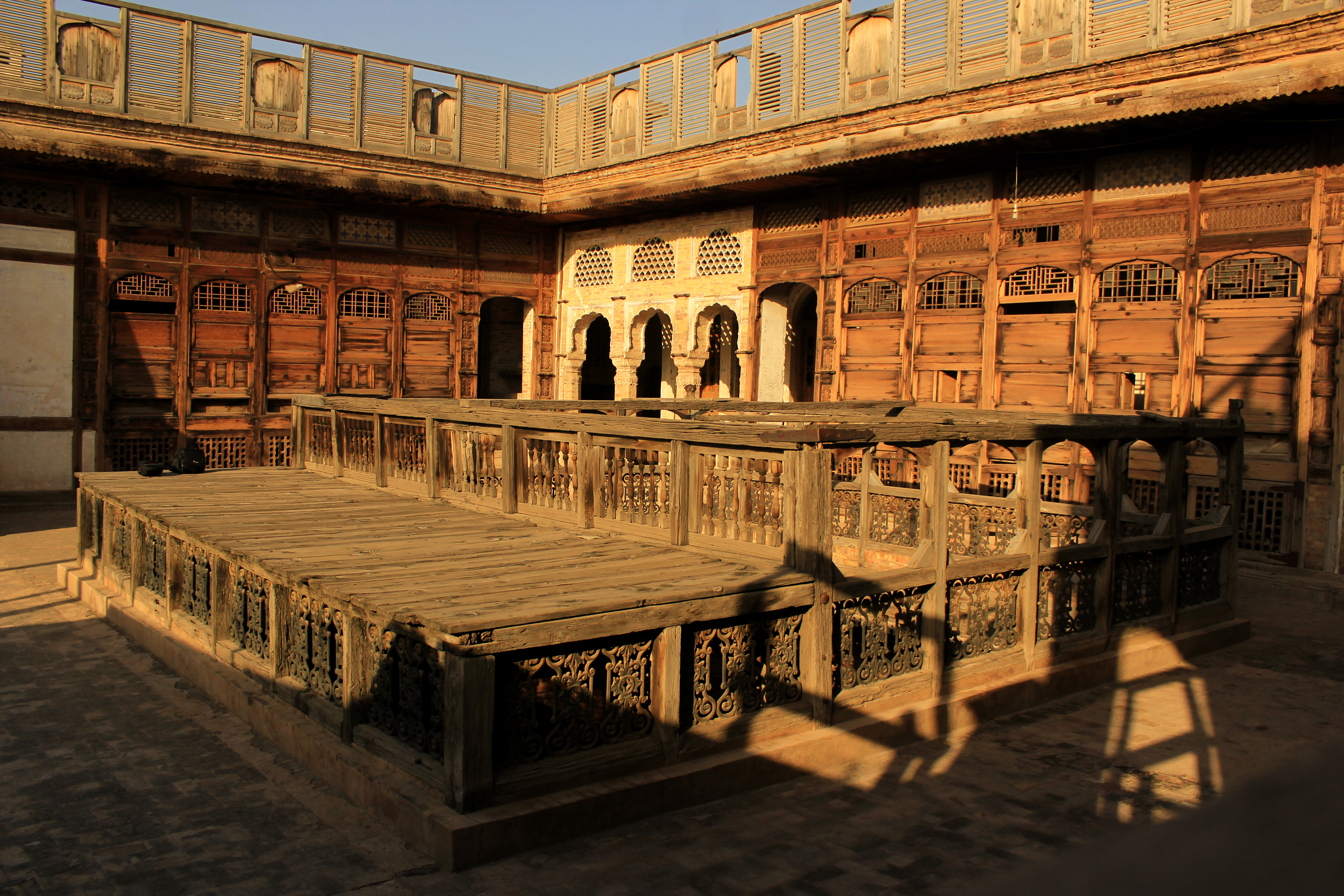

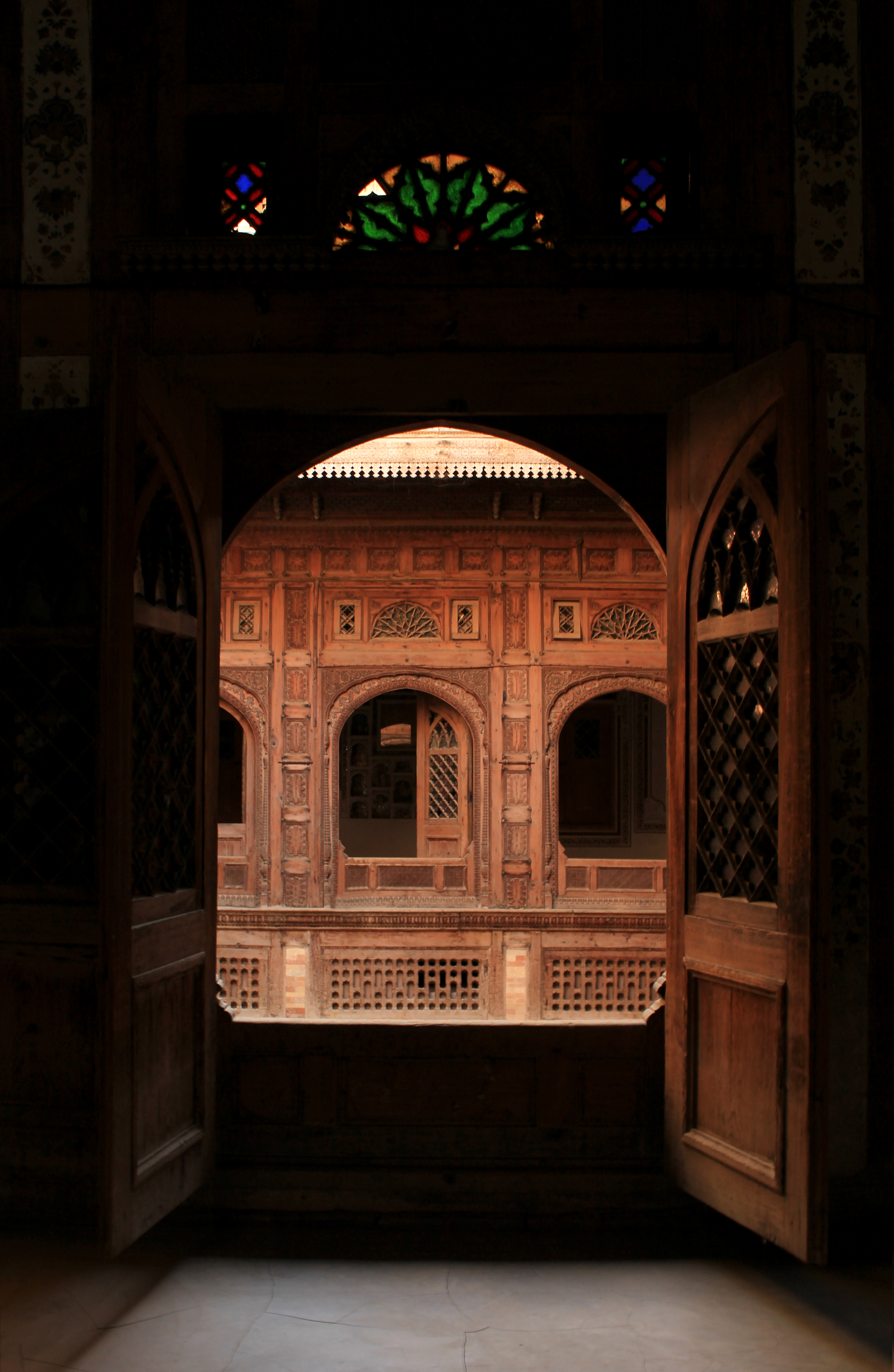

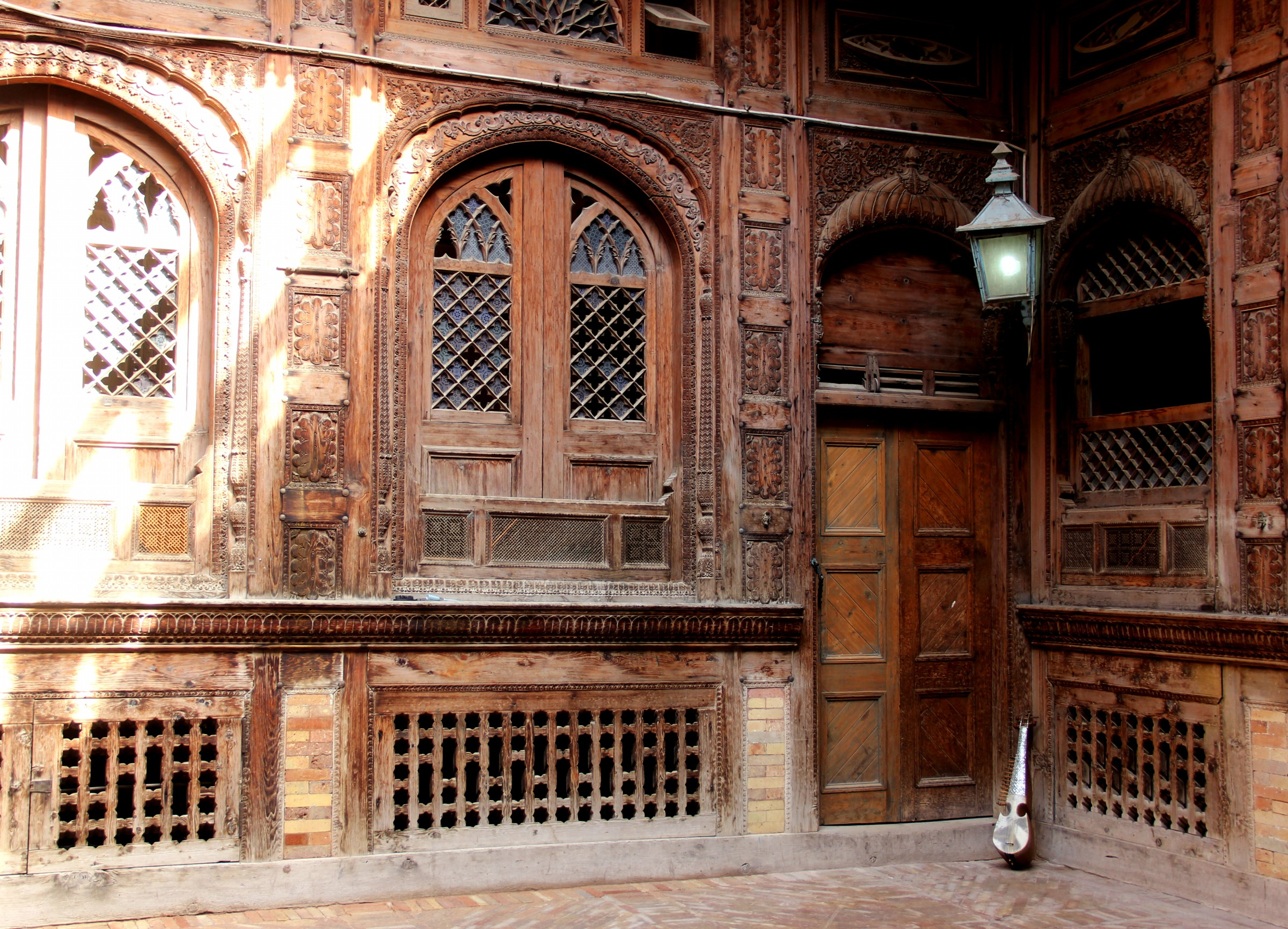
