= Sheth =

Sheth (also Seth) is an Indian surname, found in northern India and in Rajasthan, Gujarat, Maharashtra, Odisha and West Bengal. It derives from Sanskrit श्रेष्ठिन् (IAST: śreṣṭhin), meaning "banker/head of a guild".

It may also be a variant of the Western European surname Seth; if Scottish or Irish, a reduced Anglicized form of Gaelic Mac Sithigh or Ó Síthigh (see Sheehy); or of the Indian surnames Shah or Shett.

Notable people with this surname include:

- Brian Sheth (born 1975), American businessman
- Jagdish Sheth (born 1938), professor at Emory University
- Sheetal Sheth (born 1976), American actress
- Vatsal Sheth (born 1980), Bollywood actor

== See also ==
- Sethi
- Shett
- Chettiar
- Seth (surname)
