= Derek Seth-Smith =

English cricketer

Personal information
- Full name: Derek John Seth-Smith
- Born: 11 August 1920; Church Crookham, Hampshire, England
- Died: 24 June 1964 (aged 43); Chelsea, London, England
- Batting: Right-handed
- Bowling: Right-arm fast-medium

Career statistics
Competition	First-class
Matches	1
Runs scored	3
Batting average	1.50
100s/50s	–/–
Top score	3
Balls bowled	36
Wickets	0
Bowling average	–
5 wickets in innings	–
10 wickets in match	–
Best bowling	–
Catches/stumpings	-/-
- Source: Cricinfo, 25 December 2018

Derek John Seth-Smith (11 August 1920 – 24 June 1964) was an English first-class cricketer.

Born at Church Crookham, Seth-Smith was the son of the Berkshire minor counties cricketer Keith Seth-Smith. He served during World War II in the Royal Hampshire Regiment as a second lieutenant. He married Jean Halcro Erskine-Hill, the daughter of Alexander Erskine-Hill, on 16 September 1950. In that same year he appeared in a first-class cricket match for the Free Foresters against Oxford University at Oxford. He bowled six wicketless overs with his right-arm fast-medium bowling in Oxford's first-innings, while with the bat he was dismissed without scoring by Anthony Jessup in the Free Foresters first-innings, while in their second-innings he was dismissed by the same bowler for 3 runs. He died at Chelsea in June 1964.
