= Sheehy Inquiry =

The Sheehy Inquiry, officially, the Inquiry into Police Responsibilities and Rewards, was commissioned in 1992 by the United Kingdom's then Home Secretary, Kenneth Clarke (before being published in 1993), to "examine the rank structure, remuneration, and conditions of service of the police service of England and Wales, in Scotland and in Northern Ireland," and to present recommendations if found necessary. The inquiry committee was chaired by Sir Patrick Sheehy, with members John Bullock, Professors Eric Caines and Colin Campbell, and Sir Paul Fox among the committee. The committee released its report, commonly known as the Sheehy Report, in 1993, with recommendations for significant restructuring of ranks and remuneration, detailed in seven sections in over 200 pages.

== Findings ==
The report, calling for restructuring of the ranks of UK police forces, listed seven sections related to ranking, pay, conditions, and budgeting of the police, offering implementation advice in one section. Detailing the need for change within police forces around the United Kingdom, also taking into account "the special and difficult circumstances of the Royal Ulster Constabulary", the inquiry raised the issues of ineffective resource management; a lack of accountability; a "top heavy" rank structure and management; a need for focus on frontline policing; a need for recognition of police efforts, and a need for employment of civilian staff within the police - referred to in the report as 'Civilianisation'.

The report called for the abolition of the ranks of chief inspector and chief superintendent, claiming that there were "significant overlaps between ranks", and also called for the abolition of the rank of deputy chief constable, intending to have them replaced by an assistant chief constable, claiming that the duties of a deputy can still be taken on by an assistant. It also called for responsibility reallocation of current serving officers, recommending ranks such as 'operational officer', 'team leader', 'policy formulator' and 'chief executive' should be created, while also offering the chief constable more responsibilities over their police forces, also finding the 'gold', 'silver' and 'bronze' command system, already in use by the Metropolitan Police at the time, an effective means of command by means of rank flexibility.

== Reception ==
The report was widely condemned by the police in the UK, and most of its recommendations were rejected by the subsequent Home Secretary, Michael Howard.
