= Sethi Town (Haji Camp) =

Pakistani neighbourhood

Coordinates: 34°01′N 71°37′E

Sethi Town, Haji Camp سیٹھی ٹاؤن
- Interactive map of Sethi Town, Haji Camp
- Country: Pakistan
- Province: KhyberPakhtunkhwa
- City District: Peshawar
- Union Councils: 1

Population (1998 Census)
  - Total: 34,000 (3% growth rate)
- Postal code: 25000
- Area code: 091

Sethi Town (Urdu: سیٹھی ٹاؤن) is a neighborhood in Haji Camp, Peshawar, Pakistan located in the east of historic Peshawar city near Haji Camp Bus Terminal of Peshawar.

== Geographical location ==
Sethi Town is the first Union Council of Pakistan because it is represented in the UC-1, PK-1, NA-1 electoral constituencies at different tiers of government. The township is located at the east of Peshawar city, exactly at its entrance. At its south-east, the three main routes GT Road, Ring Road, Peshawar and Motorways of Pakistan join. This renders the township as strategically important area.

== Ethnic groups and cultural diversity ==
Ethnic groups in Sethi Town (Haji Camp) include Pakhtuns, Hindkowans & Afghan refugees, especially Hazaras and Tajiks. More than 99% of the population of Sethi Town is Muslim. This endows the township with a substantial cultural diversity. In a single street, it is common to find people speaking Urdu, Pashto, Hindko and Farsi. The famous tribe of Khalisa are the descendants of Abdul Qadir Khan and his sons Abdul Jalil Khan and Abdul Rashid Khan.

== History ==
This township was mainly developed in early 90s after the settlement of Afghan refugees in this area. This also resulted in an increase of the rent in the region. However, most of the residents of this township are now Pakistanis.

== Political views ==
As for cultural diversity, the area has a large diversity for the political support, mainly for Pakistan Tehreek-e-Insaf (PTI) and ANP with limited support JUI-F. However, currently majority of the young and most of elders are strong supporters of the Pakistan Tehreek-e-Insaf. Several senior Pakistan Tehreek-e-Insaf leaders have visited the area.

== Hand-made carpet industry ==
During 90s, most of the Afghan refugees settled in the area were craftspeople weaving handmade carpets. This became a major livelihood for these refugees in Sethi Town. However, in 2013, the law and order situation and the return of refugees to Afghanistan, had adversely affected the industry.

== Main sites ==
- Hussain Chawk - Sir Buland Pura - Ghalib Street - Pakistan International Public School - Nasim Masjid (main mosque of the township) - Khan Colony

[syedabad street]
