= Faiza Seth =

Entrepreneur and philanthropist

- Born: Hyderabad, India
- Education: Northwestern University, Stanford University
- Occupations: Entrepreneur, Philanthropist
- Years active: 1999–present
- Title: Co-Founder of Norwest Industries Ltd. (PDS Multinational), Founder of Casa Forma, Founder of Soham for Kids
- Board member of: Member of the board at PDS Multinational Fashions Ltd, Member of the board at Weinberg College of Arts and Science, Vice Chairperson of the Northwestern University's International Campaign Committee (ICC), Board of Directors Member Northwestern Alumni Association (NAA), Board of Directors Member Northwestern College of Arts and Sciences Board of Visitors, Trustee on the Northwestern UK Foundation; Patron of the British Fashion Council; LGT Sustainable Textile Committee; Serpentine International Council

Faiza Seth (born c. 1977 in (Hyderabad, India) is an American entrepreneur and philanthropist based in London.

== Early life and education ==
Seth grew up in Chicago and after graduating from Northwestern University in Evanston, Illinois in 2000 with a BA in Economics, she moved to Hong Kong and worked on the Equity Capital Markets team at Lehman Brothers. She continued her education at Stanford Graduate School of Business from 2004-2006 where she obtained her MBA. Faiza Seth founded Casa Forma, an architectural and interior design firm headquartered in London in 2007.

== Career ==
In 1999, she co-founded Norwest Industries Ltd, an apparel sourcing and distribution business in Hong Kong.

Casa Forma:

Casa Forma Limited is a London-based architectural and interior design company specialising in creating bespoke luxury real estate & luxury turnkey interior design. Casa Forma was founded in 2007 to develop properties in super prime locations of London and also offers its interior and architectural design services to third parties. Since inception, Casa Forma has successfully completed over 60 luxury residential and commercial projects in London as well as internationally. This international practice provides a comprehensive interior design and architectural design service for residential, commercial and hospitality properties.

Faiza Seth leads Casa Forma’s strategy and development initiatives as the founder and CEO of Casa Forma. After she finished business school at Stanford University (in 2006) and moved to London, she was interested in taking advantage of the property market in super prime locations of London which she felt had long term growth prospects due to international demand. Therefore, she started Casa Forma initially as a property development business and bought properties to develop.

Casa Forma won 18 design and architectural awards between 2011 and 2019 with The International Design & Architectural Awards, The UK Property Awards, and The Society of British Interior Designers (SBID) awards companies.

Soham For Kids:

As founder of a charitable school in India, Soham For Kids, Seth took part in a Q&A panel discussion in 2011, organised by the National Council of Voluntary Organisations.

== Recognition ==
- Shortlisted for the Asian Women of Achievement Awards 2011 for her work with Soham For Kids
- Hello Magazine Hall of Fame Awarded Faiza Seth of Casa Forma Celebutante of the Year 2011
- Be a leader it's the only way to survive - money control
- India Inspiration - Edition Page Suite
- 35 Women under 35
- Frost Magazine
- The International Design & Architectural Awards 2011, 2012, 2013, 2014, 2015, 2016, 2017 and 2019
- UK Property Awards 2012, 2014, 2017 and 2018
- SBID Awards 2013
- Between Worlds
- Everybody wants his house to look like a hotel
- A taste for excellence
- Faiza Seth Interior designer - Fortune India
- A Woman’s Luxury Business - Wall Street Journal
- Saved by the BRICs - Wall Street Journal
