= Meera Sethi =

Indian-Canadian visual artist (born 1975)

- Born: 1975 (age 50–51); Delhi, India
- Education: York University
- Occupation: Visual artist

Meera Sethi (born 1975) is a Toronto-based visual artist. Sethi was born in Delhi, India and immigrated to Toronto early in her life, her art sits between the space of diaspora and homeland.

== Education ==
She received a BA in Fine Arts in 1998 and then gained an MA in Arts in 2001, both from York University.

== Art practice ==
Sethi is a multidisciplinary artist whose research based includes painting, drawing, soft sculpture, illustration, social practice and performance. Throughout her oeuvre, Sethi looks at the meaning that people inscribe onto their clothing. Her research-based practice, delves into the intricacies of the history of cotton, the contemporary life cycle of clothing production from the growing cotton to the weaving of fabric to the labour conditions of construction of articles to the disposal of the clothing.

Sethi's early projects Firangi Rang Birangi and Begum evolved as meditations on the fashion of queer diasporic people, paying special attention to the patterns, silhouettes and colours. These investigations are broadened to include figures, both imagined and based on real people in subsequent works.

=== Upping the Aunty ===
Sethi's Upping the Aunty was a three-part project consisting of paintings, street photography, and an adult colouring book to celebrate the sartorial culture of the South Asian aunty. This project has been the subject of numerous academic studies.

=== Recent work ===
Sethi's recent work has two separate but related strains. One strain focuses on the historical and contemporary conditions of cloth manufacturing while the other expands her figurative painting practice beyond the focusing on clothing and brings in her existing interest in domestic interiors. In the Who's your Dadi? series, Sethi picks off on her Upping the Aunty series looking at the space that paternal grandmother's hold.

In 2023, she had a two simultaneous solo exhibitions with two new bodies of work. Outerwhere series are twelve winter coats which have been made into soft sculpture of collaged textiles and found objects. Each of these coats tell a political and personal story woven together. Cotton Exchange is a series seven paintings that reproduced a bas sculpture relief on the Cotton Exchange building in Mumbai, India. The original sculpture depicts the entire journey of cotton textile production in the early 20th century. Included in this exhibition was Articles of Clothing in which Sethi magnified images of protesting textile workers after the collapse of Rana Plaza. Through drawing, she reproduced the workers' textiles.

In 2024, Sethi had a solo mid career retrospective exhibition titled Meera Sethi: A Brief History of Wear at the Varley Art Gallery of Markham. This exhibition featured a span of work from over 15 years including painting, drawing, collage, soft sculpture, performance documentation, and illustration. Sethi produced a second edition of Upping the Aunty colouring book for this retrospective exhibition.

Her artwork has appeared on the CBC television shows Sort Of and Kim's Convenience.

== Exhibitions ==
=== Solo exhibitions ===
- 2013 Foreign Returned, Sofitel on Collins / Melbourne, Australia
- 2016 Upping The Aunty / Daniels Spectrum, Toronto, ON, Canada
- 2017 Begum, The Freedom Factory, Toronto, ON, Canada
- 2022 Who's Your Dadi?, exhibition text Laila Malik, Hamilton Artists Inc., Hamilton, ON, Canada
- 2023 ritual intimacies, curator Noor Bhangu, Dunlop Art Gallery, Regina, Canada
- 2023 Cotton Exchange, exhibition text by Natasha Bissonauth, Cambridge Art Galleries Preston, Cambridge, ON, Canada
- 2023 Outerwhere, exhibition text by Natasha Bissonauth, Cambridge Art Galleries Queen's Square, Cambridge, ON, Canada
- 2025 Meera Sethi: A Brief History of Wear, Varley Art Gallery of Markham, Markham, ON, Canada

=== Group exhibitions ===
- 1998 Dirty Laundry and Parting Thoughts, curated Pamila Mathuru Propeller Gallery, Toronto, ON, Canada
- 1999 (w)hole, Emittance, Gallery 76, Toronto, Canada, brochure
- 2000 Private Thoughts/Public Moments, Art Gallery of Ontario, Toronto, ON, Canada
- 2009 Transpulsations: New Asian Canadian Imaginings, curated Doris Sung and Jooyeon Rhee, Gales Gallery, Toronto, ON, Canada
- 2010 Environmental Warnings, A Space (vitrines), 401 Richmond Street West, Toronto, ON, Canada
- 2010 Life of a Vagabond: Contemporary Art from Canada / curator Ali Adil Khan, Tivoli Art Gallery, Dhaka, Bangladesh
- 2013 011+91 | 011+92 / Art Gallery of Mississauga / Mississauga, ON, Canada
- 2017 On the Margins of the Divine, Trinity Square Video (vitrines) / Toronto, ON, Canada
- 2018 Convenience, curator Belinda Kwam & Tak Pham, 187 Augusta Gallery / Toronto, ON, Canada
- 2021 Upping The Aunty and Begum, In Visible / curator Hitoko Okada, Art Gallery of Burlington, Burlington, ON, Canada
- 2021 Articles of Clothing, Fashion Forward & Adelante Siempre, curator Hitoko Okada, WAHC, Hamilton, ON, Canada

== Public art ==
- 2013 Church Street Mural Project / Toronto, Canada
- 2017 Friends of the Pan Am Path Mural / Toronto, Canada
- 2022 Colour of the Year, curated Julie Nagam Nuit Blanche Toronto / Commissioned Artist

== Residencies ==
- 2019 Distributed Identities, Banff Centre for the Arts, led by Deanna Bowen and Brendan Fernandes, Alberta, Canada
- 2019 InterAccess x South Asian Visual Art Centre, 12-month Studio Bursary Program
- 2020 Centre for South Asian Civilizations, University of Toronto Mississauga, 3-month Artist-in-Residence
- 2021 MAG Exchange Program, Mentor to artist Sanaa Humayun
- 2023 Rewilding the Body Eclectic, led by Zachari Logan and Siddhartha V. Shah, Banff Centre for the Arts, Banff, Alberta, Canada
- 2024 Pierre Lassonde Artist-in-Residence Program, Mount Allison University (6 month)

== Collections ==
Sethi's work is held in the following permanent collections:

- Royal Ontario Museum, Wedge Collection (2 works, as of 23 January 2024)
