= Michael Seth Silverman =

Canadian specialist in HIV/AIDS and infectious disease

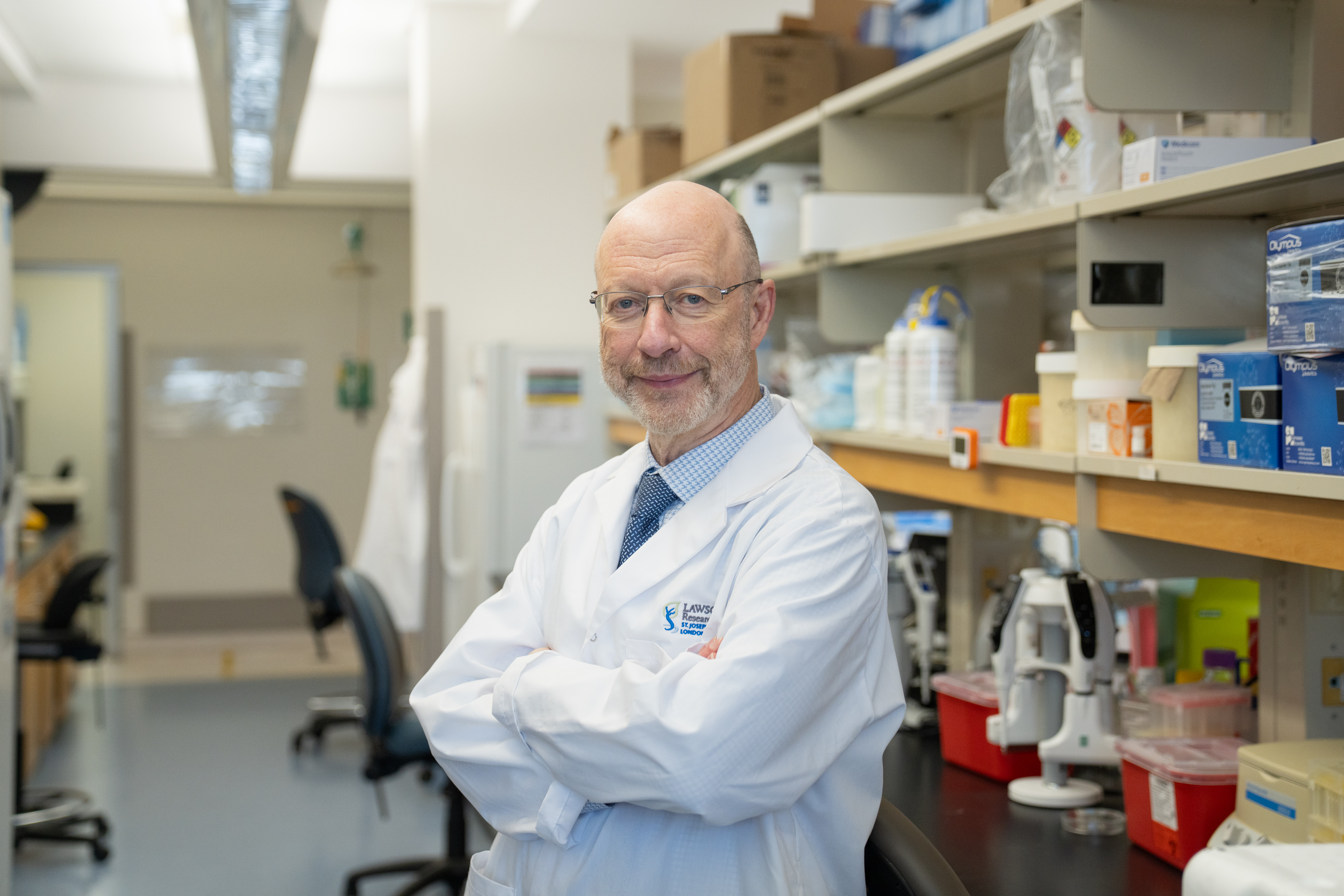
- Born: Toronto, Ontario, Canada
- Citizenship: Canadian
- Occupation: Specialist in Infectious Diseases
- Employer(s): Lawson Research Institute of St. Joseph's Health Care, London.
- Website: https://www.sjhc.london.on.ca/

Michael Seth Silverman is a Canadian specialist in HIV/AIDS and infectious disease specialist, and clinical researcher. He is Chief of Infectious Diseases at St. Joseph's Health Care London and London Health Sciences Centre and holds academic appointments at Western University in London, Ontario and the University of Toronto. Silverman is recognized for his early clinical use and research into Fecal Microbiota Transplantation (FMT) in North America, initially for recurrent C. difficile (Clostridioides difficile) infection and later for broader immune-related and metabolic conditions, including ongoing investigations into its role alongside cancer immunotherapy. His work has also included international clinical and public health initiatives in Guyana and several African countries, alongside research in HIV/AIDS prevention, antimicrobial stewardship, and infections among intravenous drug users. In 2026, Silverman was a co-author on peer-reviewed clinical research published in Nature Medicine examining the use of fecal microbiota transplantation as an adjunct to cancer immunotherapy.

== Background ==
Silverman has described his work in infectious diseases as intersecting medicine with social justice. He has identified stigma and intolerance as major barriers to caring for people living with HIV and other complex health conditions. He has also sought to counter misinformation surrounding HIV, particularly misconceptions about casual transmission, which he has said cause people to avoid those living with HIV and contribute to harmful stigma.

He earned his medical degree and completed his residency in internal medicine at the University of Toronto. He subsequently completed a fellowship in infectious diseases at the University of Manitoba and an HIV postdoctoral fellowship at the University of California, San Francisco, from 1991 to 1992.

Silverman was a founding director and the original director of medical operations of Ve'ahavta, a Toronto-based Jewish humanitarian organization. He later served as its vice-president and head of international medical programs. Ve'ahavta subsequently recognized his contributions to addressing the global HIV/AIDS epidemic with its Tikkun Olam Award for Medicine.

== Treatment of C. difficile with fecal transplantation ==
Silverman was one of the first North American physicians to use fecal transplantation in the treatment of recurrent C. difficile infection. He demonstrated that the procedure could be both efficacious and made simple enough for patients to do on their own at home. He also studies ways to try to reduce the overuse of antibiotics in the community. This may help reduce the incidence of C. difficile.

== Fecal microbiota transplantation plus anti-PD-1 immunotherapy in advanced melanoma: a phase I trial ==
In a world-first clinical trial published in the journal Nature Medicine, a multi-centre study from Lawson Health Research Institute, the Centre hospitalier de l'Université de Montréal (CHUM) and the Jewish General Hospital (JGH) has found fecal microbiota transplants (FMT) from healthy donors are safe and show promise in improving response to immunotherapy in patients with advanced melanoma.

== Fecal microbiota transplantation research in anorexia nervosa ==
In September 2026, researchers in London, Ontario, began recruiting for a clinical trial investigating oral fecal microbiota transplantation (FMT) in people with anorexia nervosa. Led by researchers at London Health Sciences Centre Research Institute, Lawson Research Institute and Western University, the study examines whether the capsules affect participants’ gut microbiomes, nutrition and food choices. Silverman and Seema Nair Parvathy lead Lawson's FMT team, which screens donors and prepares capsules customized for the trial. Elizabeth Osuch and Jeremy Burton are the study's co-leads.

According to Osuch, the researchers also plan to assess changes in participants’ immune status, cognitive functioning, mood, food cravings and body image. These assessments form part of the investigation into whether altering the gut microbiome could help manage anorexia nervosa.

The researchers planned to recruit 20 participants aged 16–35 with restricting-type anorexia nervosa and assess them using questionnaires and stool samples collected before and at several points after taking the capsules. The study is funded by the Academic Medical Organization of Southwestern Ontario.

== Treatment of metabolic disease and weight gain with fecal transplantation ==
In a Canadian study where Silverman served as principal investigator, the effects of fecal transplants on liver fat in people with fatty liver disease showed changes in the recipients' guts, making the gut membrane less permeable, or "leaky."

"This is important because one hypothesis for how an abnormal microbiome could contribute to metabolic disease and weight gain is by damaging the gut barrier that keeps toxins and pathogens from crossing into the bloodstream. When this occurs, it can set off a cascade of inflammation, contributing to insulin resistance, cardiovascular disease and autoimmune conditions, said Dr. Michael Silverman, the lead author of the study and the chairman of infectious diseases at Western University in Ontario", the New York Times reported.

=== First-move advantage: advanced pancreatic cancer treatment trials using fecal transplant pills ===
With the lower survival rates of advanced pancreatic cancer, Doctor's Silverman, Maleki, and Lenehan have started a trial using fecal transplant pills to work concurrently with chemotherapy treatments at the Lawson Research Institute of St. Joseph's Health Care London and London Health Sciences Centre Research Institute (LHSCRI). Fecal transplant pills are donated from healthy-gut candidates. Silverman explained that they need to screen 43 individuals to find one who qualifies, which makes it challenging finding suitable fecal donors.

"We're involved in more studies with lung cancer, and we're hoping to start a further one with lung cancer and early stages of the study impact on lymphoma," said Silverman, who is the Clinical Director of the Fecal Microbiota Transplantation (FMT) team.

"Project 'Poop'" was the name given to the Fecal Microbiota Transplantation (FMT) initiative led by researchers at St. Joseph's Health Care London, in collaboration with Lawson Health Research Institute. Originally developed to treat life-threatening Clostridioides difficile (C. difficile) infections, the project has evolved into a pioneering clinical research platform with broad implications for cancer care. in 2025, as part of the 2024-2025 Community Impact Report, Dr. Michael Silverman was featured for his work in FMT. Dr. Silverman played a central role in advancing the project's methodology. In 2018, with Dr. Parvathy, he developed oral FMT "poop pills" (capsules containing healthy gut bacteria) becoming the first in Ontario and only the second team in Canada to do develop the treatment. The treatment has been used with other conditions, such as Anorexia Nervosa, M.S., Liver disease, and SIlverman states that FMT is showing progress with cancer as well. with the success from these findings, St Joseph's is expanding FMT research in pancreatic cancer and melanoma.

== 2026 Phase I trial at the London Health Sciences Centre Research Institute ==
On January 30, 2026, Michael J. Silverman was featured in a CTV News report discussing ongoing Canadian clinical research examining the use of fecal microbiota transplantation (FMT) to improve outcomes in cancer immunotherapy. The research, conducted in London, Ontario, involves administering orally delivered FMT capsules derived from rigorously screened healthy donors to patients receiving immune checkpoint inhibitors, particularly those with advanced kidney cancer. According to the report, early findings suggest that combining FMT with immunotherapy may improve treatment response while reducing serious immune-related side effects such as colitis and severe diarrhea from cancer drugs.

Silverman emphasized the role of gut microbiome diversity in influencing immune response and noted the potential for future personalized FMT approaches tailored to specific cancer therapies. Related studies referenced in the report, including research conducted in Montreal, Quebec, have explored similar microbiome-based strategies in lung cancer and melanoma.

== 2026 Phase II Trial at the London Health Sciences Centre Research Institute ==
On May 20, 2026, the Canadian Cancer Society announced the LUNA-2 clinical trial, described as the largest Canadian clinical trial of its kind testing fecal microbiota transplantation capsules, informally called "poop pills," alongside chemotherapy and immunotherapy for non-small cell lung cancer. The phase II trial is backed by a $4 million joint investment from the Canadian Cancer Society and the Weston Family Foundation and is expected to enrol 160 patients across Canada. The study is being conducted by the Canadian Cancer Trials Group and led by researchers at London Health Sciences Centre Research Institute and Lawson Research Institute of St. Joseph's Health Care London. Lawson researchers are producing the FMT capsules, which contain carefully screened gut microbes from healthy donors.

Silverman, named as one of the researchers involved in LUNA-2, and was identified as the medical director of the FMT program, and infectious diseases expert at St. Joseph's Health Care London and Western University, is one of the researchers involved in the LUNA-2 trial. In the announcement, Silverman said "This clinical trial represents a leap forward in using FMT to create new pathways of personalized medicine. We have developed a world-first formulation of FMT, specific to cancer immunotherapy - a unique approach to care and a Canadian innovation that puts patients at the vanguard of medical discovery."

They're not just poop pills. A simple way to think about FMTs is by giving an ideal healthy group of organisms from young healthy donors, we are able to turn up the immune system so that it can attack cancer and do so safely. London has the most experience in doing FMTs in patients with cancer of any center in the world.

— Dr. Michael Silverman, Lawson Research Institute

== Work to protect injection drug users from infection ==
Silverman is involved in trying to reduce the incidence of life-threatening infections such as HIV, hepatitis and endocarditis (a heart valve infection) in people who inject drugs.

He demonstrated that the sharing of equipment used to inject drugs could help to spread HIV and Hepatitis C. The reuse of the equipment could also help to lead to bacterial contamination and then endocarditis, an infection with a high mortality. He demonstrated that this was especially problematic when long acting opiates were used. He initiated a novel community program to "cook your wash" and thus partially sterilize the fluid which would be injected using a cigarette lighter. This program helped to end an HIV outbreak in London, Ontario

Silverman also showed that starting addiction counselling while in hospital (as opposed to after their release) for persons who inject drugs with heart valve infections, was associated with a reduced risk of death, possibly because patients were more receptive to change when they realized the lethal potential of this highly fatal complication.

== Methamphetamine Use Research ==
Silverman led a study published in the Canadian Journal of Addiction in 2025 examining methamphetamine and amphetamine use in Ontario through physician-requested urine drug screening. The researchers analyzed results from 215,529 patients tested at selected community and hospital laboratories during 2017–2018. Patients who had filled a prescription for stimulants within the preceding 120 days were excluded.

Of those tested, 26,392 patients, or 12.2 percent, had presumptive positive results. Among these patients, 41.1 percent were women, 19.5 percent were over 50, and 40.5 percent were in the lowest income quintile. Concurrent positive tests for opioids and cocaine occurred in 27.0 and 29.2 percent, respectively. Patients with positive results also had greater use of primary care, emergency departments and hospital services during the two years preceding testing.

Western University's reporting on the study noted that urine testing identified use among women at approximately eight times the rate suggested by earlier studies relying on self-reported use. Silverman suggested that this discrepancy could reflect unrecognized exposure to the substances or reluctance to disclose drug use in surveys. He said the findings challenged assumptions that methamphetamine use predominantly affected young men and highlighted the need for treatment approaches addressing women and older adults.

== Canada's Response to COVID-19 ==
In December 2020, Silverman co-authored an article published in the American Journal of Public Health titled "Did Lessons from SARS Help Canada's Response to COVID-19?"

In the article, Silverman, Michael Clarke, and Saverio Stranges compared other countries' responses to Canada's, starting with the mortality rate, which was remarkably lower than that of the UK, Europe, and the United States. Silverman remarked that lockdown measures in Canada "flattened the curve" by implementing them on March 16, 2020, even though cases in Canada (measured in cases per million) were lower than in some US states. Canadians complying with these orders made a difference.

Looking back at Canada's response to severe acute respiratory syndrome (SARS), people in long-term care (LTC) were among the most affected. The authors stated that this pandemic helped to prepare the country for the COVID-19 pandemic by upgrading equipment, training staff, and stockpiling certain emergency supplies.

In conclusion, Silverman and his co-authors wrote, "Overall, Canada learned a great deal from the SARS epidemic, with improvements in public health organization, laboratory infrastructure, and hospital infection prevention and control. Unfortunately, in areas where SARS did not affect Canada, such as the LTC sector and a collapsing supply chain, vulnerabilities remained, resulting in major challenges in the COVID-19 response."

== Humanitarian Work ==
=== Guyana ===
Silverman first accompanied physicians Roy and Blaikey Rousell on a medical mission to Guyana in 1997. After joining the board of Ve'ahavta, a Toronto-based Jewish humanitarian organization, he enlisted the organization's support for a larger mission in February and March 1998. Serving as the mission's medical coordinator, Silverman joined a multidisciplinary Canadian-American team that travelled by boat to remote communities in southern Guyana. The team established temporary clinics in local schools, treated approximately 1,500 people over eight days and taught basic healthcare practices.

Ve'ahavta secured approximately $12,000 worth of pharmaceuticals for the mission, including two emergency shipments requested by Silverman after the team encountered malaria and typhoid among children. The medications were donated by Barry Sherman of Apotex, Leslie Dan of Novopharm and pharmacist Norman Stern, with additional contributions from Bayer, Parke-Davis and Becton Dickinson. The team treated conditions including malaria, typhoid, tuberculosis, yaws, leptospirosis, elephantiasis, scabies and sexually transmitted infections. Silverman also identified a case of Minamata disease believed to be associated with mercury contamination from a nearby gold mine.

Between 1994 and 2012, Silverman led diverrse medical teams of Canadian and American physicians, nurses, pharmacists and administrators on medical missions to remote communities in southern Guyana. The teams provided free medical care and taught basic healthcare skills in communities with limited access to the country's healthcare system.

During his work in Guyana, Silverman studied the association between the widespread use of antimalarial medications and bacterial resistance to quinolone antibiotics. His research highlighted how malaria-control measures, including insecticide-treated bed nets, could reduce reliance on antimalarial drugs and help preserve the effectiveness of certain antibiotics.

Silverman also contributed to research examining the origins of syphilis. The findings supported the theory that an ancestral, nonvenereal form of the bacterium was carried from the Americas to Europe following the voyages of Christopher Columbus and subsequently evolved into a sexually transmitted form.

=== Africa ===
Silverman's medical and research activities extended to several African countries, including Zimbabwe and Uganda. In rural Zimbabwe, he co-authored research examining the use of highly active antiretroviral therapy (HAART) during pregnancy and breastfeeding. The study found that the treatment was associated with reduced mother-to-child transmission of HIV.

In rural Uganda, Silverman contributed to research evaluating whether advertising the availability of prenatal ultrasound could encourage pregnant women who might otherwise rely on traditional birth attendants to attend antenatal clinics. The study found that the initiative increased the use of antenatal care.

Silverman also co-authored research examining the relationship between economic collapse, food insecurity and tuberculosis in Zimbabwe. The researchers found that tuberculosis incidence rose during the country's economic crisis and subsequently declined as economic conditions and food security improved. They identified Zimbabwe's large HIV-positive population as particularly vulnerable to the effects of food insecurity and malnutrition.

In 2009, Silverman reported that HIV prevalence among pregnant women studied at a rural Zimbabwean clinic had declined from 23 percent in 2001 to 11 percent in 2008. He suggested that the country's economic collapse may have contributed to the decline by limiting travel, commercial sex and concurrent sexual relationships, while acknowledging that other factors may also have played a role.

== Awards ==
For his contributions to the fight against the global AIDS epidemic, Silverman was honoured by Ve'ahavta with the Tikkun olam award for medicine in 2010.
