= Anthony Jessup =

English cricketer

Personal information
- Full name: Anthony Jessup
- Born: 31 August 1928; Blindley Heath, Surrey, England
- Died: 19 December 1996 (aged 68); Kensington, London, England
- Batting: Left-handed
- Bowling: Slow left-arm orthodox

Domestic team information
- Years: Team
- 1950–1951: Oxford University

Career statistics
Competition	First-class
Matches	7
Runs scored	18
Batting average	6.00
100s/50s	–/–
Top score	7*
Balls bowled	1,213
Wickets	19
Bowling average	22.73
5 wickets in innings	3
10 wickets in match	1
Best bowling	5/30
Catches/stumpings	4/–
- Source: Cricinfo, 15 May 2020

Anthony Jessup (31 August 1928 – 19 December 1996) was an English first-class cricketer.

Jessup was born in August 1928 at Blindley Heath. He later studied at Jesus College at the University of Oxford. While studying at Oxford, he played first-class cricket for Oxford University against the Free Foresters at Oxford in 1950. He played first-class cricket for Oxford until 1951, making a total of seven appearances. Playing as a slow left-arm orthodox bowler, he took a total of 19 wickets at an average of 22.73. He took a five wicket haul on three occasions and ten wickets in a match one, with best figures of 5 for 30 on debut against the Free Foresters. He took ten wickets in total in this match. Jessup died at Kensington in December 1996.
