= Patrick Sheehy =

British businessman (1930–2019)

- Born: 2 September 1930
- Died: 23 July 2019
- Occupation: Businessman

Sir Patrick Sheehy (2 September 1930 – 23 July 2019) was a British businessman who was chairman of British American Tobacco.

== Life and career ==
Sheehy was born in Rangoon, Burma, the son of John Sheehy, an Irish civil servant, and a mother of Scottish descent. He attended Saint Ignatius' College in Sydney, Australia, followed by Ampleforth College in Yorkshire.

Sheehy joined British American Tobacco as a sales manager in 1950. He was appointed deputy chairman of British American Tobacco in 1976.

Sheehy was appointed chairman of British American Tobacco in 1982. As global tobacco sales were growing slowly, Sheehy diversified the business into insurance and financial services, acquiring Eagle Star in 1984, and Allied Dunbar in 1985. Farmers Insurance of the United States was acquired in 1988, to render British American Tobacco as the largest UK-based insurance business. The retail and consumer businesses were sold off following a failed hostile takeover of British American Tobacco in 1989.

He was knighted in the 1991 New Year Honours.

In 1992 he was appointed chairman of the Inquiry into Police Responsibilities and Rewards (known as the Sheehy Inquiry), charged with reviewing police services in the United Kingdom.

Sheehy retired from British American Tobacco in 1995.
