= Karnika Seth =

Indian lawyer (born 1976)

- Born: 31 May 1976 (age 50); Noida
- Occupations: Cyber lawyer, author, educator, policymaker
- Years active: 2000-present
- Spouse: Amit Seth
- Website: www.karnikaseth.com

Karnika Seth (born May 31, 1976) is an Indian lawyer, writer, educator and policymaker. She specializes in cyber law, intellectual property law, media law, and the protection of women and children in the cyber space. She is a co-founder of the law firm Seth Associates, where she manages its Corporate & Cyber laws practice.

== Career ==
Seth is a proponent of net neutrality on the internet and advocates the principles of openness, fairness, and equal access to the internet. She spearheads the mission of promoting online safety, particularly among women and children, and is the author of the guidebook Protection of Children on Internet. She was consulted by UNICEF on laws combatting child online abuse to bring out a useful guidebook Child online protection in India in 2016 & other forums. She has actively voiced the need for India to sign a Cybercrime convention and strengthen its law enforcement to combat cybercrimes. She is empanelled advisor to the office of Controller of Certifying Authorities, Ministry of Information Technology, Government of India and National Internet Exchange Of India.

== Educator ==
Seth trains law enforcement on cyber laws and electronic evidence and is visiting faculty to the National Judicial Academy, Bhopal, the National Police Academy, Hyderabad, Central Bureau of Investigations and the National Investigation Authority and other bodies.

== Writer ==
Seth writes on key cyber law issues for legal journals and newspapers, and speaks at national and international forums on issues impacting the cyber world.

As a policymaker, she is involved with Internet Corporation for Assigned Names and Numbers ICANN forums, International Telecommunication Unions, Institution of Electronics and Telecommunication Engineers (IETE), ITU APT, Data Security Council of India, ICMEC, UNICEF, and other international and national bodies.

Her views on reforming cyber laws in India have been solicited by the Indian parliament and Ministry of Information Technology in India and the e-committee of the Supreme Court of India. She contributes her views on strengthening cyber laws in India through print, electronic media and television.

=== Publications ===
Seth has published two books:

- Computers, internet and new technology laws. Chennai, India: LexisNexis. 2012. ISBN 9789391211431.
- Protection of children on internet. Chennai, India: LexisNexis. 2015. ISBN 9789350355565.

== Awards and honors ==
Seth was conferred with the Law Day Award in 2012 and 2015 from the Chief Justice of India. She received the 2015 Digital Empowerment Award conferred by the Broadband India Forum and Ministry of Information Technology, India. She was conferred the title of honorary professor by Amity University on International Women's Day in 2017.
