= John Sheehy (administrator) =

Sir John Francis Sheehy CSI (12 October 1889 – 11 May 1949) was an Irish-British colonial official.

Sheehy was born in Tuam, County Galway, Ireland in 1889, the son of a local policeman. He received his education at Tuam Christian Brothers School and St Jarlath's College and later at St Patrick's College, Maynooth and University College Galway.

Sheehy passed the Indian Civil Service examination in 1913 and was posted to Burma where he was on active service from 1914 to 1918. After the First World War, he returned to Burma and was appointed to the Development Commission in Rangoon and in 1924 was made deputy secretary to the Burmese Government. In 1937, Sheehy was transferred to Delhi and was appointed to the Central Board of Revenue of the Finance Department of the Indian Government. He was made a Companion of the Indian Civil Service in 1939 and received a knighthood in 1943. Following India's independence from Britain in 1947, Sheehy joined the Allied Control Council in Germany. Here he served as Director of Public Revenue and Assistant Adviser to the British Military Governor.

Sheehy married Jean Newton Simpson in 1927. They had 3 children including Sir Patrick Sheehy (1930-2019), a former chairman of British American Tobacco.

Sheehy was shot to death by intruders at his house in Vlotho, Germany on 11 May 1949. He was 59.
