= Eugene Sheehy (banker) =

Irish banker

Eugene J. Sheehy (born 1954 in Carlow, Ireland) was Group Chief Executive of Allied Irish Banks Plc. He was educated at The Christian Brothers in Carlow and then Salesian College, Limerick.

He joined AIB in 1971 when he was 17 years old and spent 20 years in retail banking, including branch manager appointments in a number of Dublin branches at Capel Street, Dame Street and Phibsborough.

He completed an M.Sc. in organizational behavior at Trinity College, Dublin in 1992.

He executed a radical overhaul of AIB's branch banking operation in 1992 which entailed new and, in the view of many, unpopular changes to work practice. He also brokered a deal with staff to secure implementation. He was appointed general manager of retail operations in 1999, and managing director of AIB Bank (Republic of Ireland) in 2001. He was appointed chief executive officer of AIB's USA Division and six weeks later executive chairman-designate of Allfirst Financial Inc in March 2002 when it was in melt-down following the activities of John Rusnak.

Sheehy was appointed chairman and CEO, Mid Atlantic Division, M&T Bank, and to the executive management committee and board of M&T in April 2003, following the merger of Allfirst and M&T. Appointed AIB group chief executive-designate in March 2005, co-opted to the Board on 12 May 2005 and assumed responsibility as group chief executive with effect from 1 July 2005.

Sheehy has managed to avoid most of the controversy that affected his predecessors Michael Buckley, Tom Mulcahy and Gerry Scanlon at the bank. This included the John Rusnak affair, foreign exchange overcharging and the Deposit Interest Retention Tax evasion issue.

Sheehy retired alongside Chairman Dermot Gleeson and Finance Director John O'Donnell in 2009, following the Irish banking crisis. In October 2012, There was a Public outcry about 1 Billion Euro of Taxpayer's money being used to save AIB's pension fund and being used to finance his 529,000 Euro yearly Pension. This after during his tenure both AIB and its pension fund went bust and the taxpayer pumped in over 25 Billion Euro to save his bank.

== See also ==
- Allied Irish Bank
- M&T Bank
