= Starter =

Starter may refer to:

== Card games ==
- Booster pack § Starter deck, for collectible games
- Starter, the turned-up card in cribbage

== Food and meals ==
- Bread starter, a fermented mixture for baking
- Fermentation starter
- Starter, entrée and hors d'oeuvre, eaten to start a meal

== Science and technology ==
- Starter motors, for internal-combustion engines
- Motor starter, a motor controller for large electric motors
  - Motor soft starter
- Lamp starter, for fluorescent lights
  - Glow switch starter, a type of fluorescent starter

== Sports ==
- Starting pistol, in athletics competitions
- A player in the starting lineup
- A starting pitcher in baseball
- Operator of the starting barrier to begin a horse race

== Other uses ==
- Starter (clothing line), a brand
- Jan Janszoon Starter (1593–1626), Dutch poet
- Starter (comics), a Belgian comics series
- Starters (novel), a novel by Lissa Price

== See also ==
- Restarter (disambiguation)
- Start (disambiguation)
