= Ana Borovečki =

Croatian doctor and medical researcher

- Born: October 9, 1973; Zagreb, Croatia
- Education: School of Medicine, University of Zagreb; Faculty of Humanities and Social Sciences, University of Zagreb; Radboud University Nijmegen; Katholieke Universiteit Leuven
- Scientific career
- Fields: toxicology, clinical pharmacology, bioethics
- Workplaces: Croatian Academy of Sciences and Arts (1998–2002); School of Medicine, University of Zagreb
- Thesis: Ethics Committees in Croatia (2007)
- Doctoral advisor: Henk ten Have
- Other academic advisors: Biserka Belicze, Andrea Zlatar

Ana Borovečki (9 October 1973) is a Croatian female clinical pharmacologist and toxicologist.

== Biography ==
Borovečki is born in 1973 in Zagreb, where she attended Classical Gymnasium and graduated in 1998 at the School of Medicine at the University of Zagreb. She graduated in philosophy and comparative literature at the Faculty of Humanities and Social Sciences, University of Zagreb in 2000 with master's thesis "Marko Marulić- 'Glasgow verses'" under the mentorship of Andrea Zlatar. She mastered bioethics in 2004 at the Katholieke Universiteit Leuven. Borovečki earned her doctor's degree in bioethics in 2007 at the Radboud University Nijmegen with dissertation "Ethics Committees in Croatia", under the mentorship of Henk ten Have. She finished her specialisation in clinical pharmacology and toxicology in 2008.

She worked at the Department of History and Philosophy of Sciences of the Croatian Academy of Sciences and Arts (1998-2002). Currently, she is director of the Department of Social medicine and Healthcare protection at the School of Medicine in Zagreb.

== Selected bibliography ==
- A Guide to the History of Medicine in Old Dubrovnik (co-author with Slobodan Lang), School of Medicine, University of Zagreb, 2001, ISBN 953-6255-30-8.
- The use of checklists in clinical ethics (co-author with Hans-Martin Sass), School of Medicine, University of Zagreb and Institut fur Ethik in der Praxis, Recklinghause, 2008. ISBN 978-953-6255-39-9.
- Manual -HIV; testing and advising (co-author), Hrvatski zavod za javno zdravstvo, Zagreb, 2009. ISBN 978-953-7031-34-3.
- Public Health, Ethics and Human Rights, School of Medicine, University of Zagreb, 2014. ISBN 978-953-6255-45-0.
- Organizacija zdravstvene zaštite i zdravstvena ekonomika (co-author), Medicinska naklada, Zagreb, 2016. ISBN 978-953-176-739-2.
- Right to Live (co-editor with Stjepan Orešković and Sanja Babić), Manualia Universitatis studiorum Zagrabiensis - University of Zagreb, Zagreb, 2017.
- Introduction to Medicine and History of Medicine, Školska knjiga, Zagreb, 2021. ISBN 978-953-0-31005-6.
