= Restart =

Restart may refer to:

== Computing ==
- Reboot, the act of restarting a computer
- Reset (computing), bringing the system to normal condition or an initial state

== Music ==
- Restart (band), a Brazilian band
- Restart (Restart album), Restart's debut studio album
- Restart (Newsboys album), 2013
- Restart (Bilal song), 2010
- Restart (Nnadia Chan album), 2003
- "Restart" (Kotoko song), 2012
- The Restarts, a street punk band from London, England

== Other ==
- Restart (training course), a program in the United Kingdom for people who were long-term unemployed
- Re:START, a temporary shopping mall in Christchurch, New Zealand
- Restart, a novel by Gordon Korman.
- Restart (group), Iranian opposition group based in California, U.S.

== See also ==
- Booting
- Reboot (disambiguation)
- Reset (disambiguation)
- Restarter (disambiguation)
- Start (disambiguation)
- Start Again (disambiguation)
- Start Over (disambiguation)
