= Luis de Miranda =

French philosopher and novelist (born 1971)

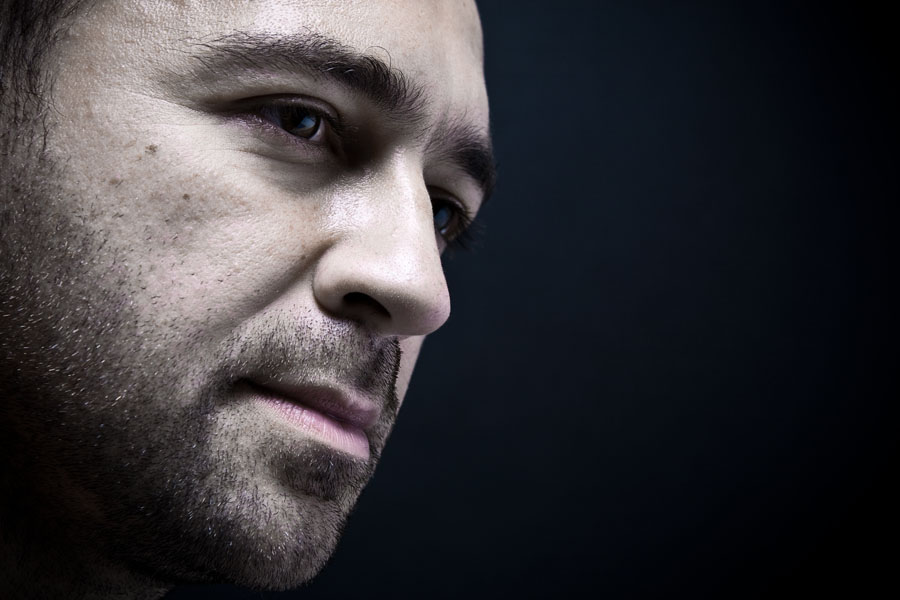
Luis de Miranda

Luis de Miranda (born 15 September 1971, Braga, Portugal) is a philosopher working in practical philosophy and bioethics, a philosophical counselor and a former novelist. He is an Associate Professor (Docent) in Bioethics at the Centre for Research Ethics and Bioethics, Uppsala University, and held a Marie Skłodowska-Curie Fellowship at the Turku Institute for Advanced Studies from 2023 to 2026. His research in practical philosophy concerns the conditions under which persons and communities live and act well: philosophical health as a dimension of care and bioethics, the ethics of artificial intelligence, the conceptual history of esprit de corps, and the moral and economic concept of goodwill. He developed the CIPHER model (Crealectic Intelligence and Philosophical Health for Eudynamic Realities), which joins the SMILE_PH dialogue method and the crealectic method. Before his academic career he published novels and essays in French and co-founded the Paris publishing house Max Milo.

== Early life and education ==
De Miranda was born in Braga and grew up in Paris. He acquired French citizenship in 1989 and Swedish citizenship in 2025. He graduated from HEC Paris in 1994, obtained a master’s degree in philosophy from Université Paris 1 Panthéon-Sorbonne in 2007, and received his PhD in philosophy from the University of Edinburgh in 2017 with a thesis on the conceptual and philosophical history of esprit de corps.

== Publishing and literary career ==
Between 1997 and 2011 de Miranda published novels and essays in French with publishers including Calmann-Lévy, Denoël, Plon and Max Milo. His novel Qui a tué le poète ? (2011) appeared in English as Who Killed the Poet? (Snuggly Books, 2017, translated by Tina Kover), and later in Chinese and Swedish editions; he discussed its translation history in World Literature Today (2017). In 2004 he co-founded the Paris publishing house Max Milo Éditions, which he co-directed until 2012.

== Academic career ==
At Edinburgh, de Miranda founded the Creation of Reality Group and the Anthrobotics Cluster, two interdisciplinary research platforms. From 2018 to 2019 he held a postdoctoral position in the philosophy of artificial intelligence at Örebro University, where he taught courses on the ethics of artificial intelligence and on humans and machines until 2020, and co-founded the CREA network on AI and effectual anticipation, funded by the Swedish Research Council and Riksbankens Jubileumsfond.

From 2021 to 2023 he was a postdoctoral fellow in medical humanities at Uppsala University, where he developed the concept and practice of philosophical health. In December 2025 he became Associate Professor (Docent) in Bioethics at Uppsala’s Centre for Research Ethics and Bioethics. Since 2025 he has been Philosophical Practitioner at the Stockholm School of Economics. From 2023 to 2026 he held a Marie Skłodowska-Curie Fellowship at the Turku Institute for Advanced Studies, University of Turku.

== Research ==
De Miranda’s work in practical philosophy examines how the ideas by which persons and institutions live shape their action and their flourishing, a concern he develops under the name bios ethikos, drawing on Aristotle.

=== Philosophical health and bioethics ===
Since 2019 de Miranda has developed philosophical health as a research field and a practice of care. He treats it as a holistic dimension of health alongside the physical and the psychological, concerned with the coherence between a person’s guiding ideas and the way they live, and the effect this may have on their general condition. He set out the framework in Philosophical Health: A Practical Introduction (Bloomsbury, 2024), reviewed in Teaching Philosophy (Shmidt, 2025), and in the edited volume Philosophical Health: Thinking as a Way of Healing (Bloomsbury, 2023).

In bioethics he has argued for understanding the field as reflection on forms of life as lived, in “Bioethics as Bios Ethikos” (Medicine, Health Care and Philosophy, 2026). In “Eudynamic Bioethics” (Medicine, Health Care and Philosophy, 2026) he revives the nineteenth-century medical notion of Eudynamie to describe the conditions under which persons and institutions approach the good life. Further work on person-centred care appears in the Journal of Evaluation in Clinical Practice (2023; 2026).

=== The CIPHER model ===
In Crealectics as a Creative Method (Palgrave Macmillan, 2025, open access) de Miranda presents the CIPHER model, which joins two methods he developed in parallel. The first, SMILE_PH (Sense-Making Interviews Looking at Elements of Philosophical Health), is a dialogue method covering six dimensions: bodily sense, sense of self, sense of belonging, sense of the possible, sense of purpose and philosophical sense (Methodological Innovations, 2023). The second, the crealectic method, proceeds in five steps: resetting, crealing, profusing, compossibilising and realising (Qualitative Inquiry, 2025).

Both methods are directed toward “eudynamic realities”, in which a person’s thinking is situated in four relations: person, earth, work and society. These relations remain open to what de Miranda calls the Creal, the ultimate possibility that exceeds any established state of affairs. He introduced the Creal in his novel Paridaiza (Plon, 2008) and developed it philosophically in Being and Neonness (MIT Press, 2019). From it he derived crealectics, a mode of creative reasoning that he contrasts with analytic and dialectical modes (The Palgrave Encyclopedia of the Possible, 2021; Human Affairs, 2020).

With co-authors he published the Philosophical Health Compass, a 48-item assessment instrument (Methodological Innovations, 2025). In 2019 he founded Philosophical Health International, a network of researchers and practitioners trained in the SMILE_PH method.

=== Esprit de corps and collective life ===
His doctoral research became Ensemblance: The Transnational Genealogy of Esprit de Corps (Edinburgh University Press, 2020). The book traces the concept from the eighteenth century to the present across French, British and American discourses. It argues that the unity of human groups is not given but performed and always incomplete, a process de Miranda calls ensemblance. It was reviewed in French Studies (Ousselin, 2021). Related articles in Global Intellectual History examine national esprit de corps (2018) and propose, with Émile Chabal, “histosophy” as an approach to long-term conceptual history (2019).

=== Philosophy of technology and artificial intelligence ===
De Miranda’s work on automation and AI began with L’art d’être libres au temps des automates (Max Milo, 2010). At Edinburgh he developed “anthrobotics”, the view that partial automation has always been part of what humans are, and applied his work on esprit de corps to social robotics (2016). He edited 30-Second AI and Robotics (Ivy Press, 2019), translated into more than fifteen languages. More recent articles examine whether AI can measure philosophical health (Open Philosophy, 2025) and the role of AI companions in care (Topoi, 2025). In a 2026 op-ed in Dagens industri he argued that AI can require human oversight without preserving human judgement, and described how the competence to oversee AI systems, which the EU Artificial Intelligence Act requires of those supervising high-risk systems, can be formed and maintained.

=== Goodwill ===
Since 2026 de Miranda’s research has partly focused on goodwill, from its moral sense in the philosophical tradition to its accounting sense as an intangible asset, and on what this shift means for care and work. His interest in the relation between economic value and human life predates his academic career: his essay Peut-on jouir du capitalisme ? Lacan avec Marx et Heidegger (Max Milo, 2009) examined capitalism through psychoanalysis and philosophy.

== Selected publications ==
=== Monographs ===
- Crealectics as a Creative Method: A New Approach to Holistic Innovation for Compossible Worlds. Palgrave Macmillan, 2025. Hardcover ISBN 978-3-032-00426-0, Softcover ISBN 978-3-032-00429-1
- Philosophical Health: A Practical Introduction. Bloomsbury Academic, 2024. ISBN 9781350405035
- Ensemblance: The Transnational Genealogy of Esprit de Corps. Edinburgh University Press, 2020. Print ISBN 9781474454193, Online ISBN 9781474480864
- Being and Neonness. Trans. Michael Wells. MIT Press, 2019. Paperback ISBN 9780262551984

=== Edited volumes ===
- Philosophical Health: Thinking as a Way of Healing. Bloomsbury Academic, 2023. ISBN 9781350353060
- 30-Second AI and Robotics. Ivy Press, 2019. ISBN 978-1782405474
