= PFS =

PFS may refer to:

== Government ==
- Provincial Forest Service, state civil service for forests in India

== Medicine ==
- Patellofemoral syndrome, a type of knee disorder
- Prefilled syringe, a syringe with a predetermined dosage of medication
- Prefrontal synthesis, in neurology, the conscious purposeful process of synthesizing novel mental images
- Progression-free survival, time without tumor progression in oncology
- Post-finasteride syndrome, a term associated with adverse effects that persist beyond the discontinuation of the medication finasteride

== Organisations ==
- Philadelphia Folksong Society, a Philadelphia organization promoting folk music
- Property and Freedom Society, a far-right conference and online blog

=== Finance ===
- Personal Financial Specialist, a financial planning credential granted by the American Institute of Certified Public Accountants
- Primerica Financial Services, an independent financial services company in North America

=== Education ===
- Penang Free School, a well-recognized English school in Malaysia, in the state of Penang
- Princeton Friends School, a coeducational Quaker school in Princeton Township, New Jersey

== Technology ==
- Perfect forward secrecy, a property in cryptography
- pfs:Write, an early PC word processor
- Planetary Fourier Spectrometer, an infrared spectrometer used by European Space Agency on their Venus Express Mission
- Professional File System, a third-party filesystem used on the Amiga
- PlaysForSure, a marketing certification given by Microsoft to media players
- Pre-Feasibility Study, an important preliminary study to determine if a mining project is economically feasible

== Other ==
- Peace and Friendship Stadium, an Indoor sports Arena in Piraeus, Athens, Greece
- Picture Frame Seduction, a Welsh punk rock band
- Port security (Port Facility Security)
- Pha̍k-fa-sṳ, an orthography designed for the Hakka Chinese language
- Puta falta de sacanagem, an expression related to the Brazilian rock band Restart
