= Starting line =

Starting line may refer to:

- A position marking the beginning of a race
- The Starting Line, a pop punk band
- "Starting Line", a song by Luke Hemmings from When Facing the Things We Turn Away From
- "The Starting Line", a song by Keane from Strangeland
- "The Starting Line", a song by Neil Cicierega from Mouth Moods
- "The Starting Line", an episode of the American action drama television series Drive

== See also ==
- Start (disambiguation)
