= Restarter (disambiguation) =

Restarter is a 2015 album by Torche.

Restarter may also refer to:

- Restarter, a module that restarts services in the Solaris Service Management Facility
- Restarters, failed entrepreneurs who attempt to launch a subsequent startup company

== See also ==
- Restart (disambiguation)
- Starter (disambiguation)
- Start (disambiguation)
