= Anthrobotics =

Study of human-like robots

Anthrobotics is the science of developing and studying robots that are either entirely or in some way human-like.

The term anthrobotics was originally coined by Mark Rosheim in a paper entitled "Design of An Omnidirectional Arm" presented at the IEEE International Conference on Robotics and Automation, May 13–18, 1990, pp. 2162–2167. Rosheim says he derived the term from "...Anthropomorphic and Robotics to distinguish the new generation of dexterous robots from its simple industrial robot forebears." The word gained wider recognition as a result of its use in the title of Rosheim's subsequent book Robot Evolution: The Development of Anthrobotics, which focused on facsimiles of human physical and psychological skills and attributes.

However, a wider definition of the term anthrobotics has been proposed, in which the meaning is derived from anthropology rather than anthropomorphic. This usage includes robots that respond to input in a human-like fashion, rather than simply mimicking human actions, thus theoretically being able to respond more flexibly or to adapt to unforeseen circumstances. This expanded definition also encompasses robots that are situated in social environments with the ability to respond to those environments appropriately, such as insect robots, robotic pets, and the like.

Anthrobotics is now taught at some universities, encouraging students not only to design and build robots for environments beyond current industrial applications, but also to speculate on the future of robotics that are embedded in the world at large, as mobile phones and computers are today. In 2016 philosopher Luis de Miranda created the Anthrobotics Cluster at the University of Edinburgh "a platform of cross-disciplinary research that seeks to investigate some of the biggest questions that will need to be answered" on the relationship between humans, robots and intelligent systems and "a think tank on the social spread of robotics, and also how automation is part of the definition of what humans have always been". To explore the symbiotic relationship between humans and automated protocols.
