= Start Over =

Start Over may refer to:

- Start Over (album), a 1987 album by Cheryl Lynn
- "Start Over" (Beyoncé song), 2011
- "Start Over" (Band-Maid song), 2018
- "Start Over", a song by 5 Seconds of Summer from the album Everyone's a Star!, 2025
- "Start Over", a song by the Afters from the album Light Up the Sky, 2010
- "Start Over", a song by Imagine Dragons from the album Evolve, 2017
- "Start Over", a song by Zac Brown Band from the album Welcome Home, 2017
- "Start Over", a song by Gaho from the soundtrack album of the television series Itaewon Class, 2020
- Start Over, English language title of Année Zéro, a French-Belgian television series

== See also ==
- Start (disambiguation)
- Restart (disambiguation)
- Start Again (disambiguation)
- Starting Over (La Toya Jackson EP), 2011
- "Start All Over", a song by Miley Cyrus from the album Meet Miley Cyrus, 2007
- "Start All Over", a 1957 song by Lee Emerson, covered by Bob Gallion
