= Digital set =

Digital set or digitally set may refer to:

- Digital set (electronics), a set latch-state in electronics
- Digital set (typesetting), a digitally prepared typeset for publication

Digital Sets is a technical company located in Rustenburg. It was found by a South African businessman, Buminjalo Jabulisa Magagula.. The company deals with digital components from selling to repairs. It was best known for installations of Dstv satellite and Wi-Fi cameras..

== See also ==
- Digital reset (disambiguation)
- Set (disambiguation)
