= Jan Jansz van de Velde =

Dutch Golden Age painter (1620–1662)

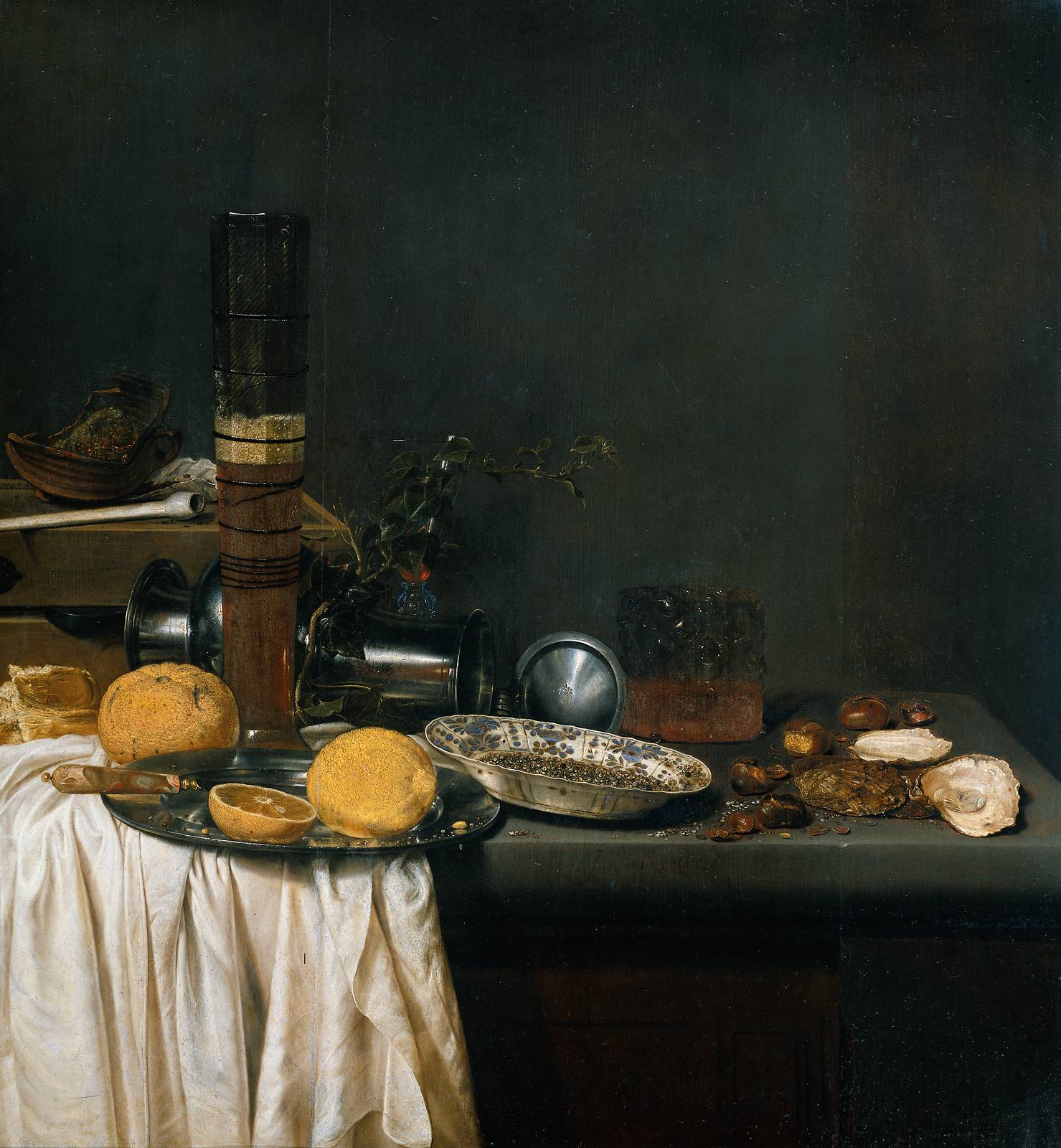
Still Life with Tall Beer Glass, 1647

Jan Jansz van de Velde (1620 – July 10, 1662) was a Dutch Golden Age painter.

== Biography ==
Van de Velde was born in Haarlem. According to the RKD, he was taught to paint by his father Jan van de Velde, but his still lifes show the influence of the Haarlem still life painter Willem Claesz Heda. He was active in Haarlem, in Amsterdam (in 1642 where he was married), and in Enkhuizen (the year of his death). Around 1620, he (and perhaps also his father) became the teacher of the calligrapher Nicolaes Bodding van Laer, the younger brother of Roeland and Pieter van Laer. He died in Enkhuizen.
