= Puta falta de sacanagem =

Brazilian Internet meme

The moment when Georgia Massa says puta falta de sacanagem

Puta falta de sacanagem is an Internet meme that appeared in Brazil in 2010. It originated from a phrase said by Georgia Massa, who was present in an autograph session of the Brazilian rock band Restart.

After the information that the event had to be cancelled, the Brazilian newspaper Folha de S.Paulo interviewed some of the angry fans, one of them being Georgia Massa. Massa, who was nervous, got confused and said the cancellation had been a "puta falta de sacanagem" (something like "fucking lack of immorality" in English).

That phrase, together with "vou xingar muito no Twitter" ("I'm going to curse a lot on Twitter"), became a popular Internet meme in Brazil and was noticed even by Restart itself, that presented a song in tribute to this episode. Afterwards, Georgia Massa and other fans who were present at the event were invited to watch a show of the band.

Puta falta de sacanagem is considered one of the reasons for the success of Restart, as well as having boosted its on-line popularity. The meme was also nominated for the 2010 MTV Video Music Brazil in the category Web Hit of the Year.

== History ==
=== Event ===
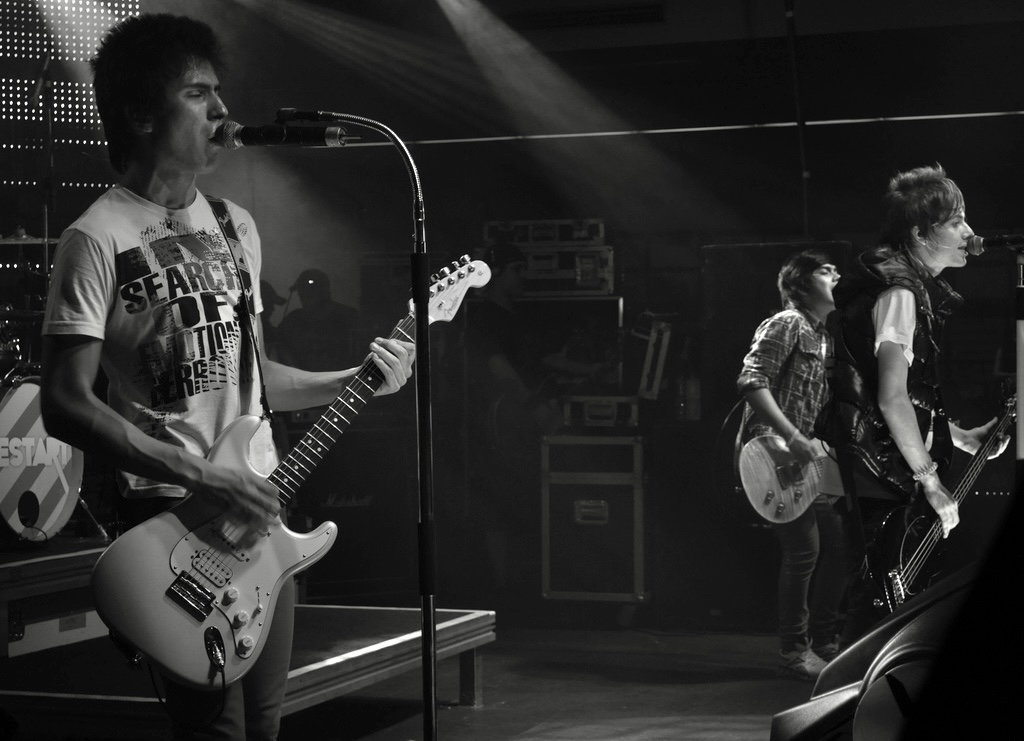
Restart performing in 2010

On 28 April 2010, an autograph session and a small concert by the Brazilian band Restart were scheduled to take place at a Fnac library on the Paulista Avenue in São Paulo. One of the band's intentions was to promote their self-titled debut album. The event organizers planned to distribute 250 wristbands to young people who wanted to meet the band. However, estimates suggest that the total number of attendees reached three thousand. Because the crowd exceeded expectations, the bookstore canceled the event shortly before it was due to begin, citing safety concerns.

This news created an atmosphere of outrage among fans, both those who had permission to enter (with a wristband) and those who wanted to enter at any cost; some of these fans had been queuing since dawn. There was criticism of the event's lack of communication, as many people did not know that a wristband would be required to participate. The library usually had twelve security guards, and even doubling that number before the event began, the commotion generated by the cancellation announcement could only be contained with the support of the Military Police.

Later, the band Restart published an apology note on their Twitter account, saying: "We apologize to everyone who went there and unfortunately couldn't be with us. Our greatest wish was to be there with you, but we can never afford the lack of security that you deserve."

=== Video from Folha de S.Paulo ===
Amid the commotion, Inara Chayamiti, a video reporter for Folha de S.Paulo, went to the site to interview fans who were to attend the event on video. One of them was Georgia Massa, then 16 years old. Nervous and crying, she confused the phrases "puta sacanagem" (a fucking immorality) and "falta de respeito" (lack of respect), saying: "I think [the cancellation] is a fucking lack of immorality on the people here, who are feeling sick. I haven't eaten, I'm feeling sick." In an interview, she justified the confusion: "I was nervous. There was pushing and shoving, and I was already dizzy. I meant that it was a fucking lack of consideration." Massa said that she did not consider herself a fan of Restart: "My friend decided to buy a CD by the band Restart and wanted to go to the autograph session that was happening that day. I went along, just to accompany her." Other phrases from the interview that had repercussions include "Vou xingar muito no Twitter" (I'm going to curse a lot on Twitter) and "Restart não presta mais" (Restart is no good anymore), said by Luis Carlos Marinho, who had been waiting since the morning and was indignant about the cancellation; (Note: Luis said, in full: "Restart is no good anymore, because I arrived at eight in the morning and they didn't come to talk to us. I'm not going to forgive them. I'm going to curse on Twitter today, a lot. Seriously.") and "A 'Família Restart' não vai deixar barato" (The 'Restart Family' won't let this go easily). (Note: "Família Restart" ("Restart Family") was how the band's fans referred to themselves.)
