= Jan van de Velde =

Dutch artist (1593–1641)

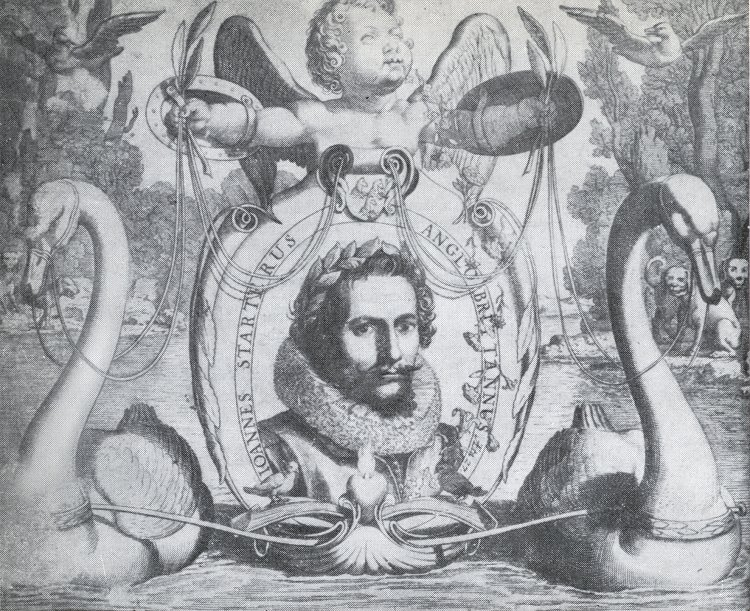
Engraving by Jan van de Velde of songwriter Jan Jansz Starter portrayed as poet of the lyric of love in 1621. The swans symbolize himself and pull Cupido away from The Isle of Dogs.

Jan van de Velde the younger (1593 – c. 1 November 1641) was a Dutch Golden Age painter and printmaker, mostly of animal, landscape and still-life subjects. He was the son of Jan van de Velde the Elder and the father of the still life painter Jan Jansz van de Velde.

== Biography ==
Van de Velde was born in either Delft or Rotterdam, to the calligrapher Jan van de Velde the Elder from Antwerp and Maijcken Van Bracht from Turnhout. He was apprenticed to engraver Jacob Matham in 1613, entered the Haarlem guild in 1614, and then probably visited Italy. He is better known for his etching and engraving than for his painting. According to Houbraken, he was the brother of Esaias van de Velde and Willem van de Velde the Elder, but according to John Denison Champlin, Esaias was his cousin, and he was no relation at all to the family of Willem. He died in Enkhuizen.

== Drawings of Haarlem ==
In 1616, he drew several scenes of Haarlem as a series of 26 landscape prints. The success of this venture led him to expand it thirty years later to 60 prints, most of which are in the possession of the North Holland Archives. In the archives are also a few prints from a series of 12 local landscapes by Esaias, which indicates that they may have collaborated on this project.

Upon the death of his publisher, his works were offered for sale in 1674 in an advertisement in the Haarlems Dagblad:

May 15th, 1674

Op den 16 Mey en volgende dagen sal men tot Haerlem, op de Zael van 't Princen-Hof, verkopen de Boeckwinckel van Passchier van Wesbusch, bestaende in Nederduytsche Boecken; mitsgaders 36 Folio Kopere Platen tot 3 seer bequame Matery-boecken van Jan vande Velde.

Translation: On the 16th of May and following days, the contents of the book store of Passchier van Wesbusch (Haarlem publisher) shall be sold in the Princenhof room of the City Hall, consisting of many Middle-Dutch books, including 36 folio copper plates and three very skilled sketch books by Jan vande Velde.
