= Digital reset =

Digital reset or digitally reset may refer to:

- Digital reset (computing), the reset of a digital computer
- Digital reset (electronics), a cleared latch-state in electronics
- Digital reset (typesetting), a digitally prepared typeset for publication either from a previous digital typeset or a complete rework of a work previously published with traditional typeset

== See also ==
- Digital set (disambiguation)
- Reset (disambiguation)
