= Ami (camera) =

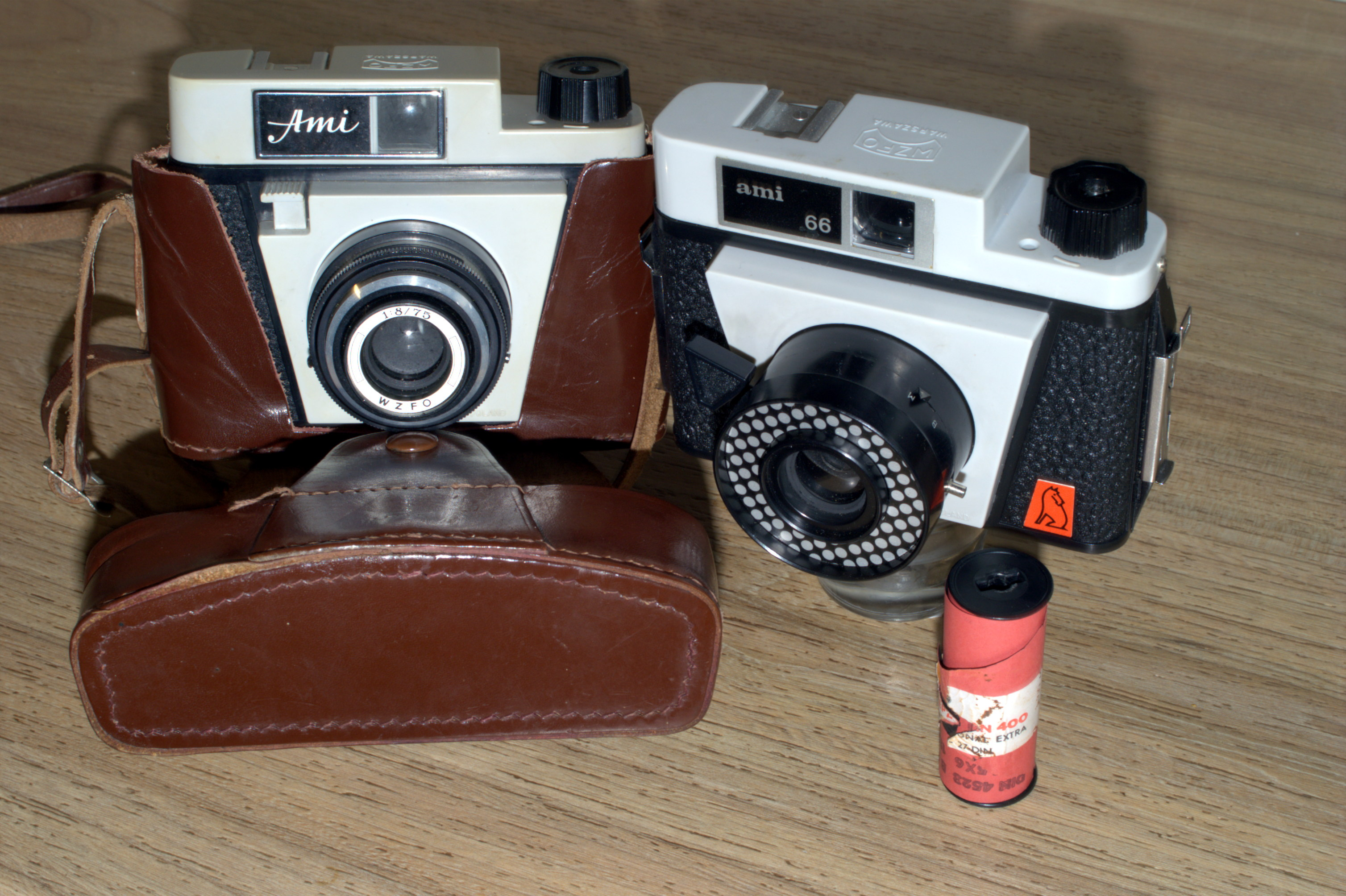
Ami and Ami 66

The Ami is a viewfinder camera made of plastic, produced during the communist era of Poland era by the Polish firm Warsaw Photo-Optical Works or WZFO. It was the successor to their Bakelite-cased Druh camera, which was popular with youth due to its simplicity. The Ami was also quite popular, although its availability was sometimes restricted due to production limits in the economy imposed by the government.

The word ami does not have any particular meaning in Polish, but French was a widely known language in Poland at the time and it is thus possible that the name refers to the French word ami ("friend").

== Models ==
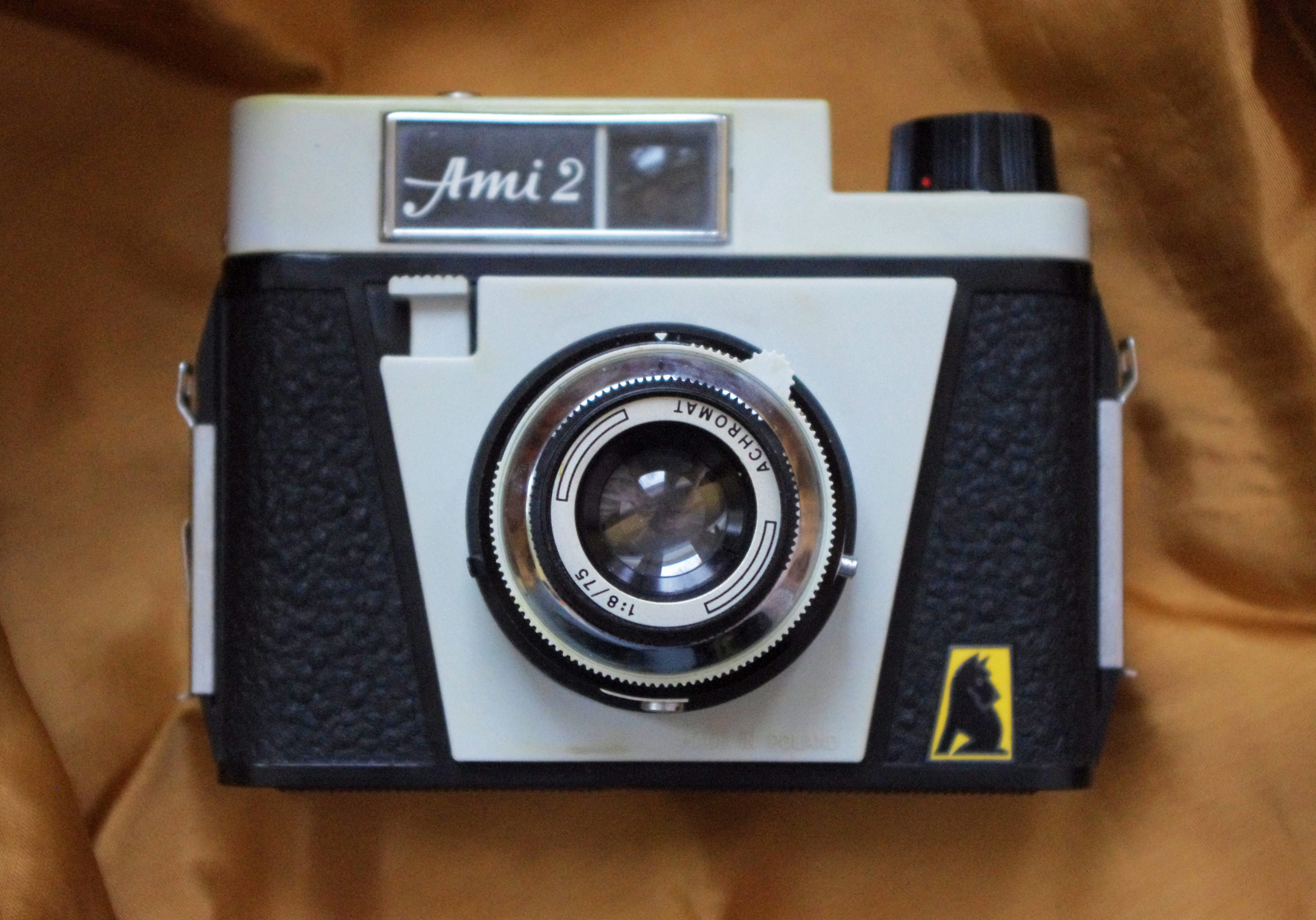
Ami 2

Three models of the Ami were released: the original Ami, the Ami 2, and the Ami 66. All three had bodies made from styropol, a high-impact polystyrene, which substantially reduced the weight compared to the Druh. The Ami was intended for use by amateurs, and as such, was intentionally made to be simple to use. There was little in the way of custom settings to adjust; users could simply click the shutter and advance the film.

=== Ami 2 ===
The Ami 2 was a more sophisticated version of the Ami, including two focus points and three different shutter speeds.

=== Ami 66 ===
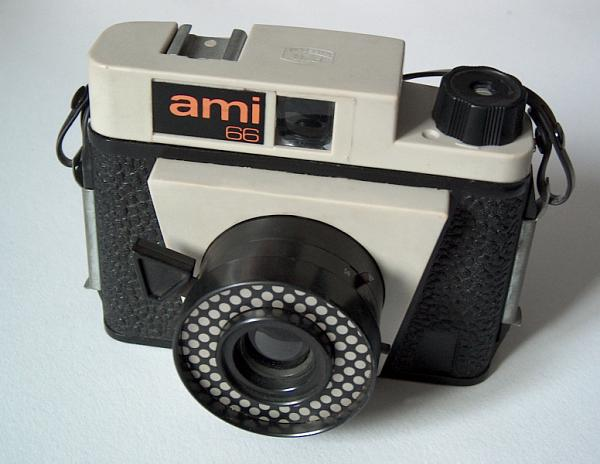
Ami 66

The Ami 66 was released towards the end of the 60s. It featured a completely redesigned body compared to its predecessor, although it was still made of stryopol. The shutter was simplified further for ease of use. A pop art design of white dots around the lens (which resembled photocells) was meant to attract attention. A logo in its lower right corner printed on flame-red background depicted a dog.

The camera has a B (bulb) option that allowed for keeping the exposure open indefinitely, for use in a dark environment or indoors.

Ami 66 was accompanied by an all-leather case designed for this camera with production dates marked inside the snout of the case and inside the strap; a slightly tight fit. The convex back of the camera indicates that it was made for a camera without a film plane.

== Technical data ==
Ami

- Film: 120
- Lens: meniscus lens 1:8/75mm, achromatic
- Aperture: f/8 (cloudy) and f/16 (sunny)
- Shutter: sector shutter ca. 1/50 only
- Focus: fixed
- Flash: mountable, synchronized for flash bulbs only
- Body: high-impact polystyrene

Ami 2

- Film: 6×6 cm
- Lens: meniscus lens 1:8/75mm, achromatic
- Aperture: f/8 (cloudy) and f/16 (sunny)
- Shutter: central at 1/30, 1/60, 1/125 and B
- Focus: adjustable from 2.5 meters to hyper focal infinity
- Flash: mountable, synchronized for flashbulbs and electronic flashes
- Body: high-impact polystyrene

Ami 66

- Film: 6×6 cm
- Lens: meniscus lens 1:8/75mm, achromatic
- Aperture: f/8 (cloudy) and f/16 (sunny)
- Shutter: 1/50 (labelled as 'M') and B (Bulb)
- Focus: fixed, from the hyperfocal distance of 2.5 meters to infinity
- Flash: mountable, synchronized for flashbulbs and electronic flashes
- Body: high-impact polystyrene
