= Warsaw Photo-Optical Works =

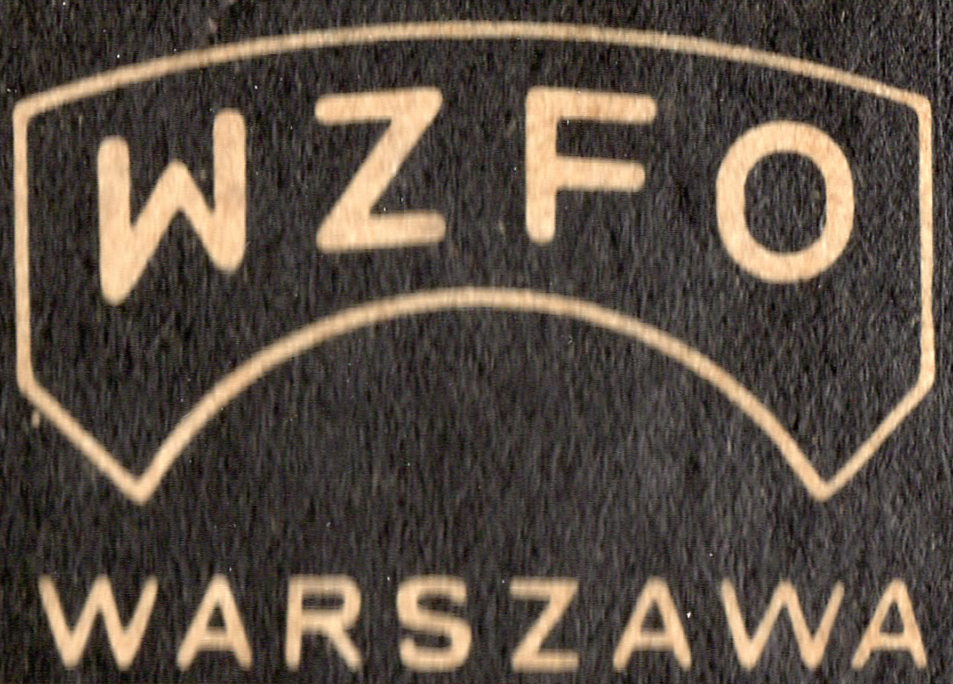
- Native name: Warszawskie Zakłady Fotooptyczne
- Company type: State-owned enterprise
- Industry: Optical instruments Photography equipment
- Predecessor: Warsaw Cine-Technical Works
- Founded: 1951
- Founder: Government of Poland
- Defunct: 1968
- Fate: Merged into Polish Optical Industries
- Successor: Polish Optical Industries
- Products: Cameras; Lenses; Photographic accessories

Warsaw Photo-Optical Works (Polish: Warszawskie Zakłady Fotooptyczne or WZFO) was a Polish firm that built optical and photographic equipment. The company was initially founded in 1951 as the Warsaw Cine-Technical Works at the direction of Prime Minister Bolesław Bierut. Oversight of the company was given to the Central Cinematography Committee of Poland, which passed the company to the Heavy Industry Ministry in 1952. The company's name was then changed to the Warsaw Photo-Optical Works, and they began to focus exclusively on producing cameras and related equipment.

The WZFO was the first company to mass-produce photographic equipment in Poland, beginning with the Start camera in 1953-1954. Between 1954-1957, WZFO introduced the Fenix, a relatively higher-end viewfinder camera, and the Druh, a simple Bakelite-cased camera popular with young people. When the Druh series ceased production around 1958, the Ami series was introduced as its replacement. In 1962, the firm released the Alfa, a small 35-mm camera that came in unconventional colors such as powder blue.

During its years in production, WZFO also produced a range of photographical equipment such as lenses, flash bulbs, magnifiers, and similar items.

In 1968, at the direction of the Heavy Industry Ministry, WZFO was merged with Polish Optical Industries.

== Gallery ==
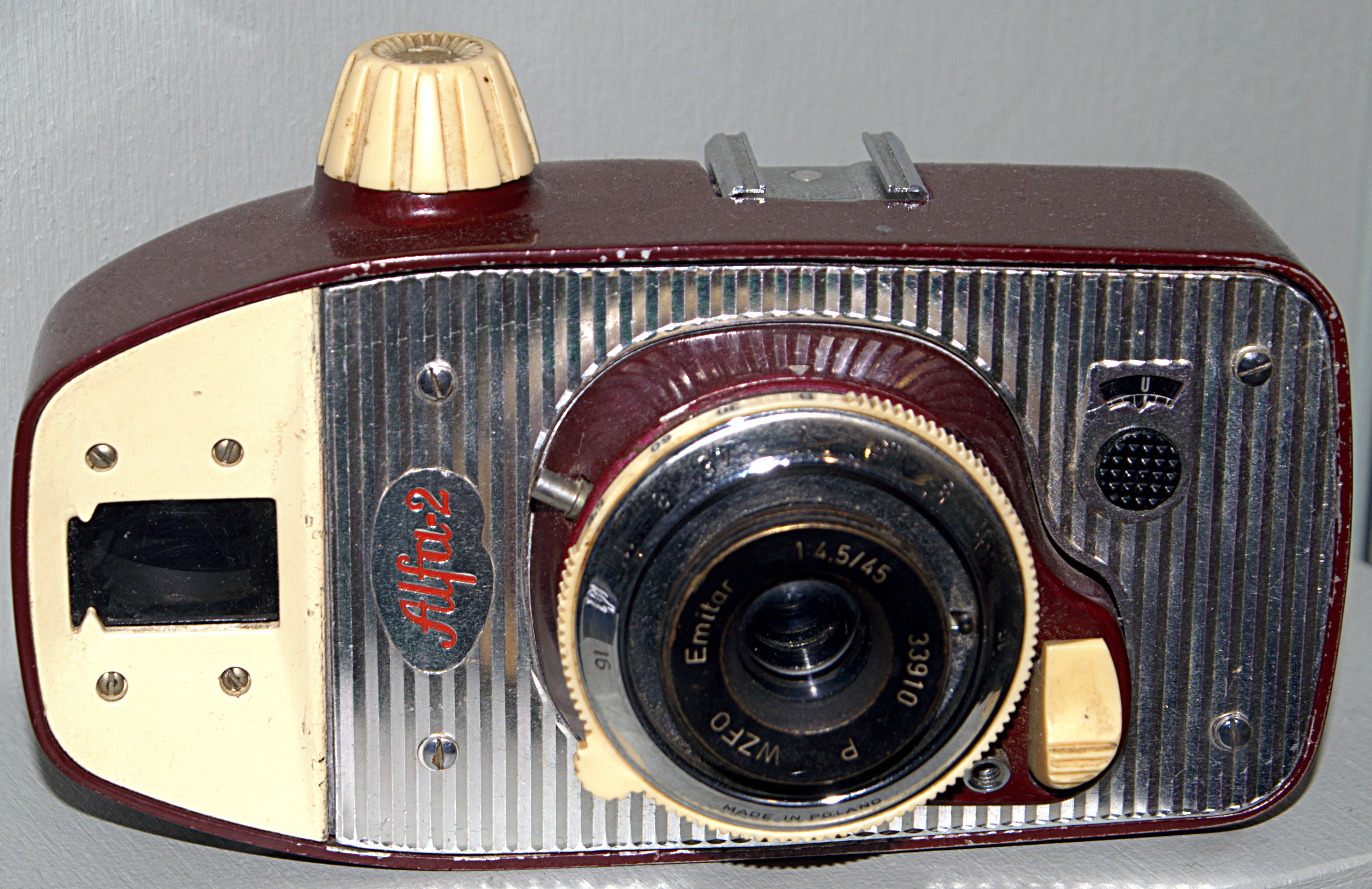
Alfa 2 in burgundy

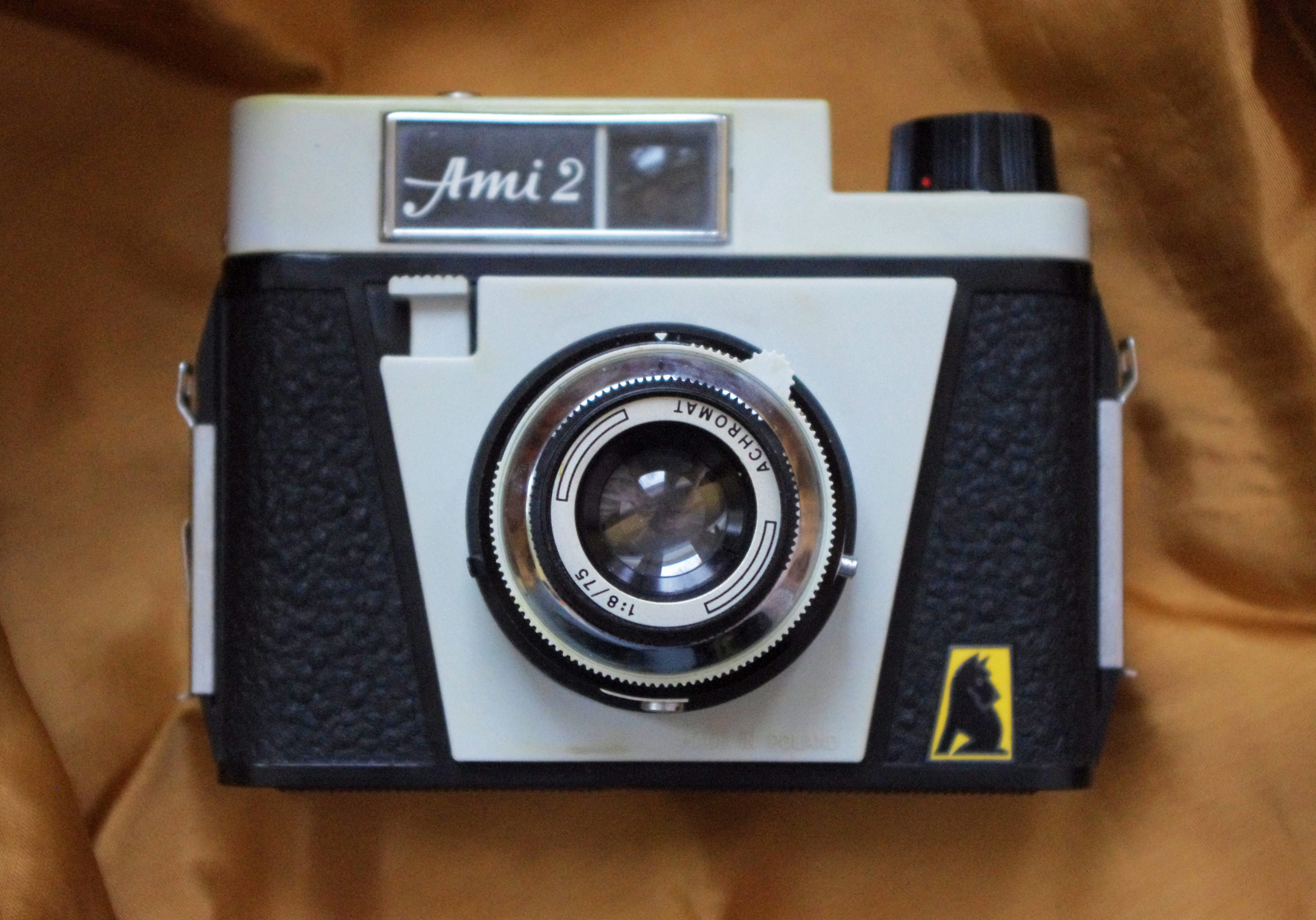
Ami 2

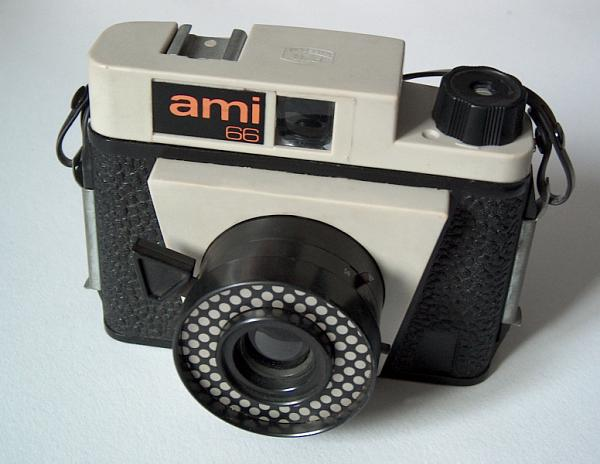
Ami 66

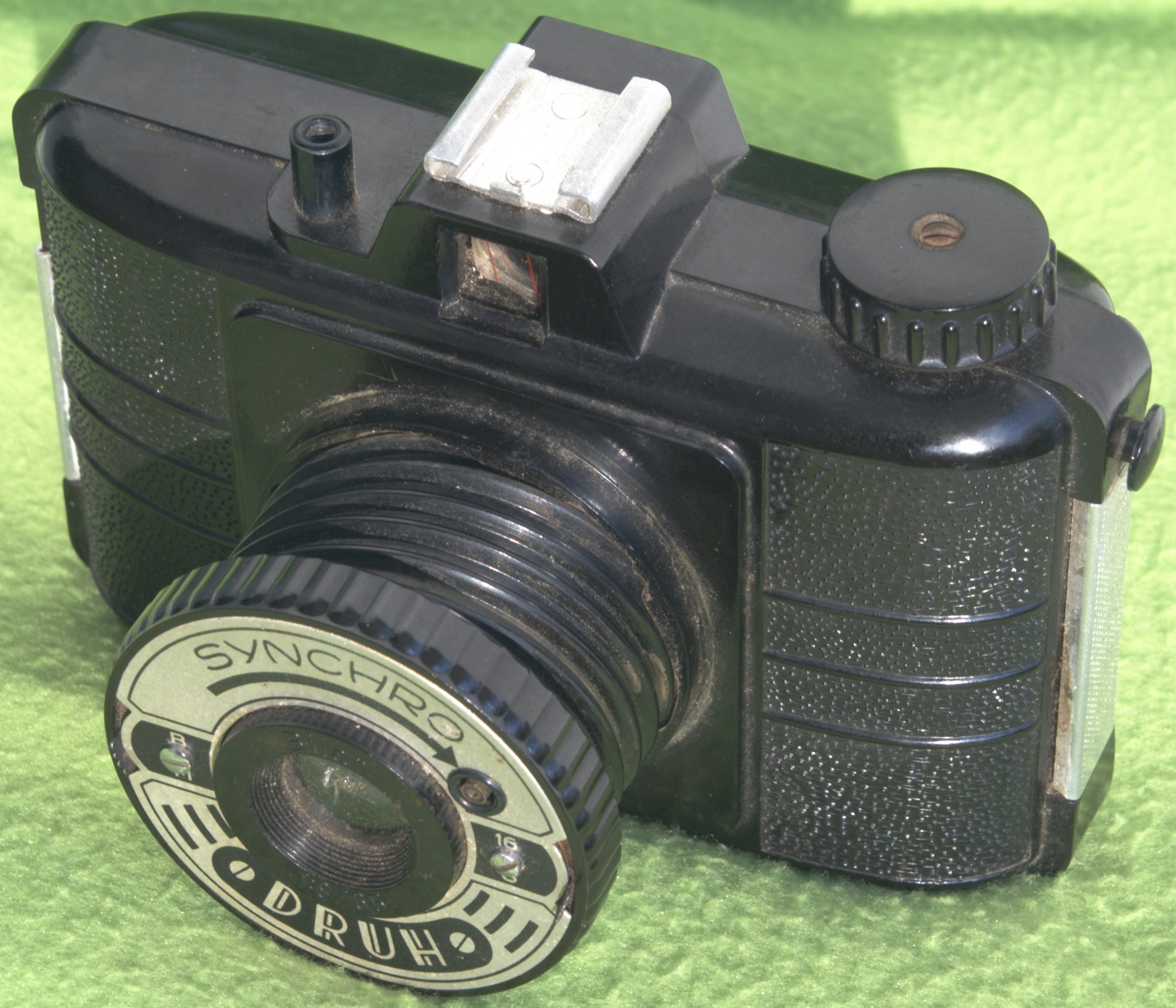
Druh Synchro

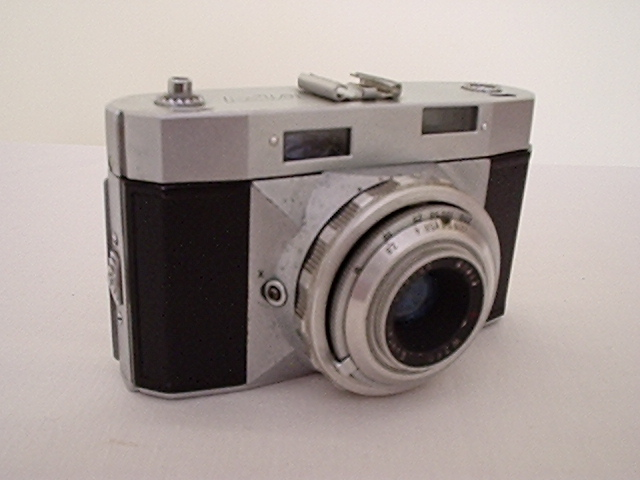
Fenix II

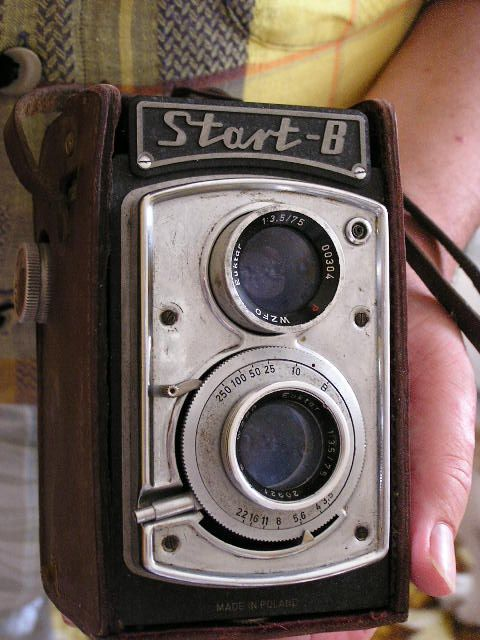
Start B

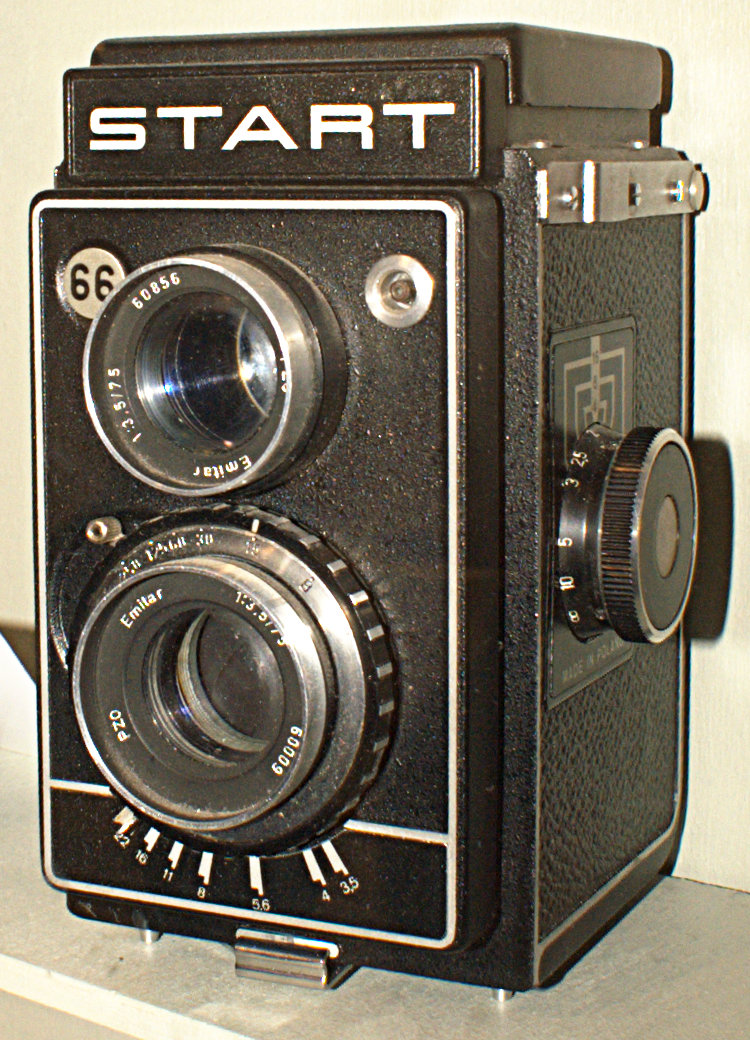
Start 66
