= Reboot (disambiguation) =

A reboot is the process of restarting a computer system.

Reboot may also refer to:

== Arts, entertainment, and media ==
- Reboot (fiction), to discard all previous continuity in a fiction series and start anew

=== Music ===
- Reboot (Brooks & Dunn album), 2019
- Reboot (London album), 2012
- ReBoot (Sam Brown album), 2000
- Reboot (Wonder Girls album), 2015
- Reboot (Treasure album), 2023
- Re-boot (album), a 2019 album by Golden Child
- Re-Boot: Live '98, a 1998 album by the band Front 242
- "Reboot" (song), by Tohoshinki, 2017
- "[Reboot]", a single from the 2019 Waterparks album, Fandom
- "Reboot", by Ummet Ozcan, 2011

=== Television ===
- ReBoot, a Canadian CGI-animated television series which debuted in 1994
- ReBoot: The Guardian Code, a CGI / live-action reimagining of the 1994 series released in 2018
- Reboot (Adventure Time), a 2016 episode of Adventure Time
- Reboot (2022 TV series), a 2022 TV series
- "Reboot" (VisionQuest), an episode of the television miniseries VisionQuest

=== Other ===
- ReBoot (video game), a 1998 video game based on the television series
- Reboot (novel), a novel by Amy Tintera
- Raaz: Reboot, a 2016 Indian film by Vikram Bhatt

== See also ==
- Booting
- Reset (disambiguation)
- Restart (disambiguation)
- Revival (television)
