= Start =

Start can refer to multiple topics:

- Takeoff, the phase of flight where an aircraft transitions from moving along the ground to flying through the air
- Starting lineup in sports
- Starts use in sport race
- Standing start, and rolling start, in an auto race

== Acronyms ==
- National Consortium for the Study of Terrorism and Responses to Terrorism
- Strategic Arms Reduction Treaties, a series of arms reduction treaties between the US and USSR
  - START I (1991)
  - START II (1993)
  - START III (1997), never signed into effect
  - New START (2010), initiated to continue the effects of previous START treaties
- "START" (The Americans), a 2018 episode and the series finale of the period spy thriller The Americans
- Simple triage and rapid treatment
- Small Tight Aspect Ratio Tokamak
- Spanish Technical Aid Response Team
- Stanislaus Regional Transit, predecessor to the Stanislaus Regional Transit Authority

== Books and publications ==
- STart (magazine), an Atari ST computer magazine published 1986–91
- Start (Yugoslav magazine), a popular entertainment magazine for men published 1969–91
- Start, a 1999 book by Terry Virgo
- Start (Bosnian magazine), a bi-weekly magazine published in Bosnia and Herzegovina since 1998

== Places ==
- Start, Louisiana, a town in the United States
- Start Point, Devon, site of many shipwrecks often referred to as "Start"
- Start Point Lighthouse, built in 1836

== Songs ==
- "Start!", 1980 song by The Jam
- Start (Rina Aiuchi song), 2004
- "The Start", 2013 song sung by Gaia Cauchi for Malta in the Junior Eurovision Song Contest
- "The Start", single and EP by Headway
- "Start", a single by Korean singer Bada
- "Start", a song by Peter Gabriel from Peter Gabriel
- "Start", by Single Cell Orchestra from their eponymous album
- "Start", 2010 song by Bomb the Bass from Back to Light
- "Start", song by Ellie Goulding from her 2020 album Brightest Blue

== Technology ==
- Start-1, a Russian launch vehicle
- Start (command), a command in Windows
- Start button
- Start menu, element in the Windows GUI
- Start screen (Windows)
- Start signal, in telecommunications

== Sport ==
- Start Nizhny Novgorod, a Russian bandy club
- IK Start, a Norwegian football club from the town of Kristiansand

== Music, arts, and entertainment ==
- Start (Stefanie Sun album), 2002
- Start (Mameshiba no Taigun album), 2020
- theStart (band), an American punk rock band
- "The Start", 2020 television series episode of Most Dangerous Game

== Media ==
- Start TV, an American TV network
- Start (streaming service), a Russian streaming service
- NPO Start, a Dutch video-on-demand service; see Dutch public broadcasting system

== Other uses ==
- Start (cereal), a breakfast cereal produced by Kellogg's since the 1980s, mainly in the UK
- Start (Polish camera), twin-lens reflex camera
- Start (Soviet camera), single lens reflex camera
- Screw starts, the number of threads on a screw

== See also ==
- Begin (disambiguation)
- Origin (disambiguation)
- Restart (disambiguation)
- Source (disambiguation)
- Start Again (disambiguation)
- Start Over (disambiguation)
- Start Point (disambiguation)
