= Jan Janszoon Starter =

Jan Jansz. Starter
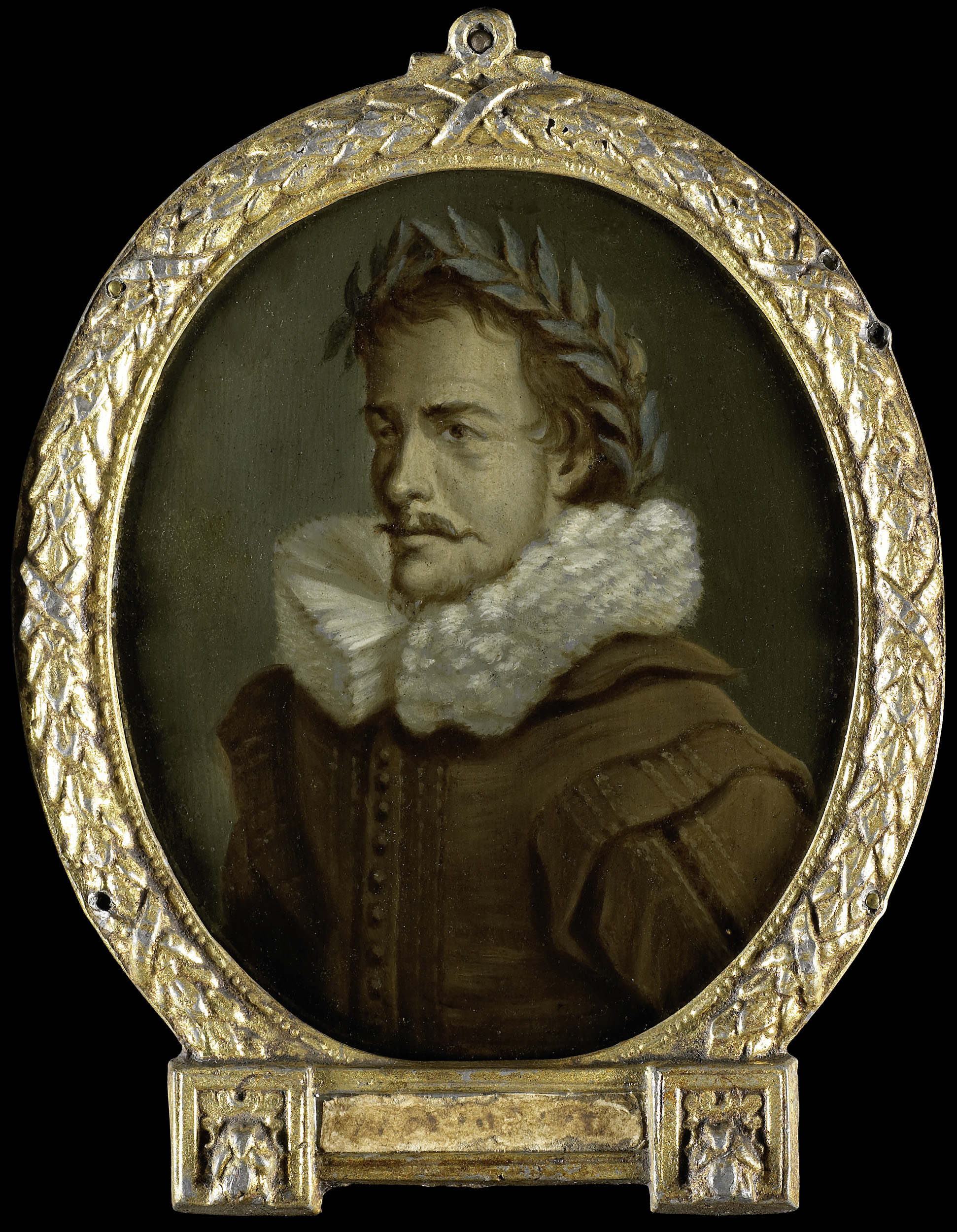
- Portrait of Starter in the Pan Poeticon Batavum
- Born: 1593; Amsterdam
- Died: 1626 (aged 32–33)

Jan Jansz. Starter (1593 – 1626) was a poet from the Dutch Republic.

Starter was born in Amsterdam and became a prolific writer, whose poems were set to melody in his lifetime. He died young in battle. Many of his poems became the subject of other artworks such as plays or paintings. He is best known for his poem about the "Mennonite Sister".

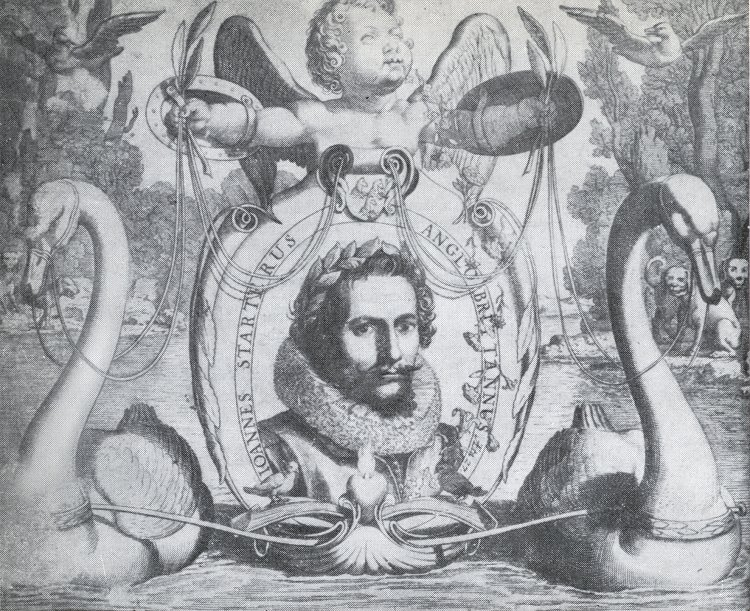
engraving of Starter for the title page of his Friesche Lusthof, by Jan van de Velde
