= Reset =

Reset may refer to:

== Film and television ==
- Reset (2017 film), a 2017 Chinese film
- Reset (2024 film), a 2024 Sri Lankan short film
- Reset (Chinese TV series), a 2022 Chinese time-travel/whodunit streaming television series
- Reset (South Korean TV series), a 2014 South Korean television series
- "Reset" (Arrow), the sixth episode of the eighth season of Arrow
- "Reset" (Torchwood), the sixth episode of the second series of science-fiction series Torchwood

== Music ==
- Reset (Canadian band), a French-Canadian punk band
- Reset (Norwegian group), a Norwegian Eurodance group
- "Reset" (song), a song by Outkast from their 2003 album Speakerboxxx/The Love Below
- Reset Records, a British record company

=== Albums ===
- Reset (Tina Arena album), 2013
- Reset (Atari Teenage Riot album), 2014
- Reset (Flying Lotus EP), 2007
- Reset (Funky album), 2011
- Reset (Moneybagg Yo album), 2018
- Reset (Mutemath EP), 2006
- Reset (Panda Bear and Sonic Boom album), 2022
- Reset (Set Your Goals EP), 2006
- Reset (Turmion Kätilöt album), 2024
- Peace Orchestra: Reset, by the Peace Orchestra

== Other uses ==
- Reset (computing), to bring a system to normal condition or initial state
- Reset (horse), an Australian racehorse
- Reset (law), in Scotland the crime of possessing stolen goods
- Reset (military), an equipment refurbishment process
- Ramsey RESET test, in statistics a general specification test for the linear regression model
- Resetting (typesetting), the act of renewing the typeset of a publication, often in the process of preparing a digital republication of a traditionally set work
- Russian reset, an attempt by the Obama administration to improve relations between the United States and Russia in 2009
- Virgile Reset (born 1985), French footballer
- Reset, a 2017 book by Ellen Pao

== See also ==
- Reboot (disambiguation)
- Restart (disambiguation)
- Set (disambiguation)
- Digital reset (disambiguation)
