= Henk A. M. J. ten Have =

Dutch ethicist

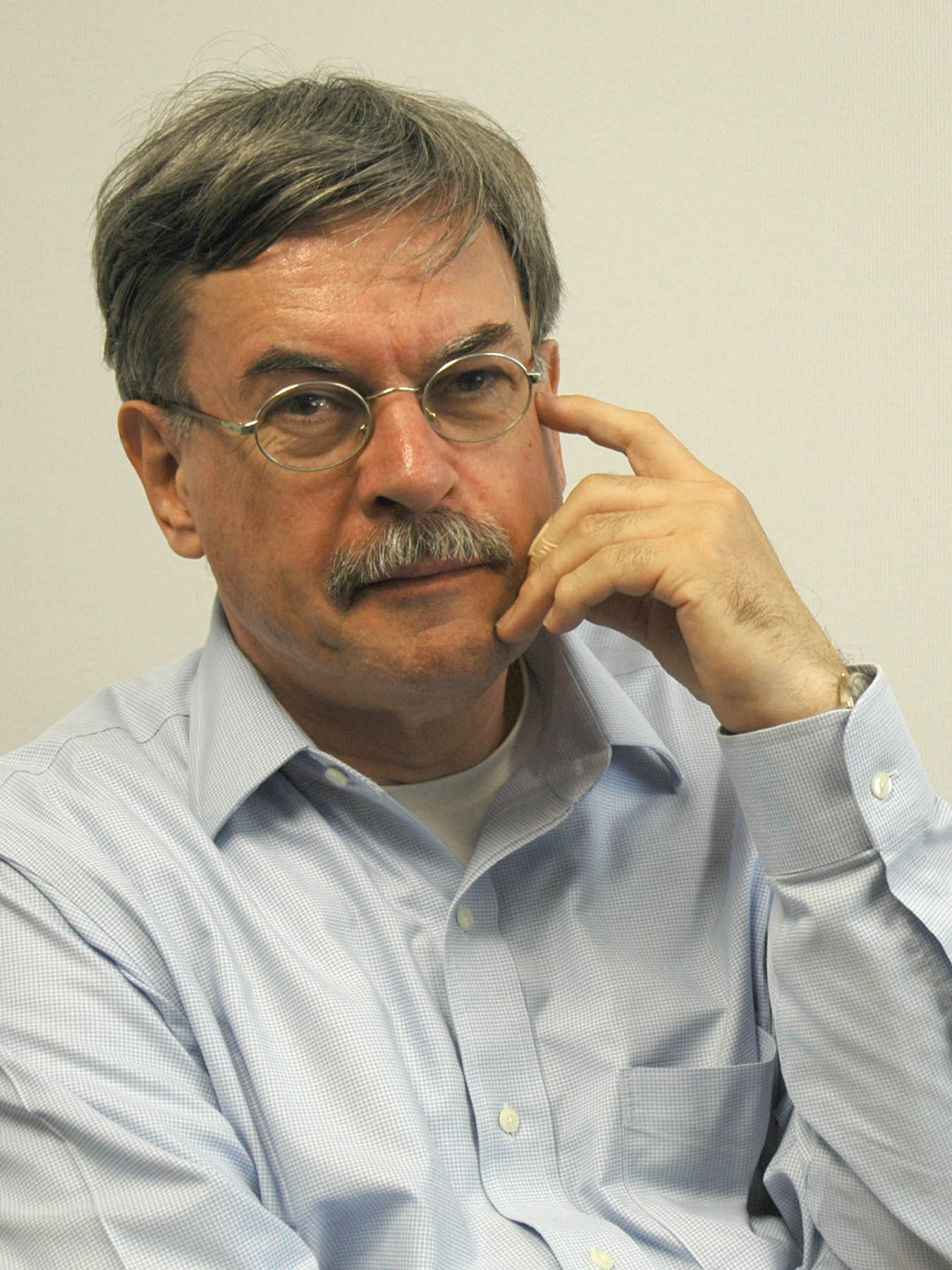
- Born: June 1951 (age 75); Voorschoten, Netherlands
- Occupation: Professor of healthcare ethics

Academic background
- Education: Medicine (MD; PhD) and philosophy (PhD)
- Alma mater: Leiden University

Academic work
- Discipline: Bioethics
- Institutions: Duquesne University

Henk Antonius Maria Johannes ten Have (born 1951) is a Dutch ethicist. He is Professor emeritus at the Center for Healthcare Ethics at Duquesne University in Pittsburgh, United States where he has been director since 2010. Previously, he served in UNESCO as Director of the Division of Ethics of Science and Technology (2003–2010). His recent works are: Global Bioethics—An Introduction (2016), Vulnerability—Challenging Bioethics (2016), Encyclopedia of Global Bioethics (2016), and Wounded Planet (2019).

== Biography ==
Henk ten Have was born in Voorschoten, Netherlands in June 1951. After completing his secondary school (grammar school, 'alpha') in May 1969 he started studying medicine at the University of Leiden and was awarded the Medical Degree in April 1976. In 1978 and 1979 ten Have worked as a physician in the Municipal Health Services (GG&GD) in the city of Rotterdam. In June 1982, Henk ten Have was appointed as part-time Instructor at the Maastricht University in Maastricht, the Netherlands. In January 1983 he was awarded the PhD degree in philosophy at the University of Leiden. In July 1985 he was appointed professor in philosophy at the State University of Limburg. In September 1991 Henk ten Have was appointed to the Catholic University of Nijmegen (now Radboud University Nijmegen) as Professor of Medical Ethics. He became involved in many public debates as well as expert committees in the area of healthcare ethics and healthcare policies. He was also appointed as member of the newly founded Central Committee on Research involving Human Subjects (CCMO) in the Netherlands (1999–2003), and served in the Ethical Issues Review Panel of WADA (World Anti-Doping Agency) (2006–2008).

In September 2003, ten Have moved to UNESCO (United Nations Educational, Scientific and Cultural Organization) in Paris as Director of the Division of Ethics of Science and Technology. Shortly after he had arrived, the member states invited the Director-General to explore the possibility of developing a universal declaration of global bioethical principles. Under his guidance, the International Bioethics Committee drafted the text and carried out consultations in many countries and with various stakeholders. The Universal Declaration on Bioethics and Human Rights was unanimously adopted by all member states of UNESCO on 19 October 2005. Since then, ten Have has set up several UNESCO programs to implement the Declaration, such as the Ethics Education program, the Global Ethics Observatory, and the National Bioethics Committees program. Retiring from UNESCO in 2010, ten Have was appointed in July 2010 as Director of the Center for Healthcare Ethics at Duquesne University in Pittsburgh, U.S.A. He retired in 2019.

== Some recently published books ==
- H.A.M.J. ten Have, R.H.J. ter Meulen, M.C. de Vries, B.C. ter Meulen (2020): Leerboek ethiek in de gezondheidszorg. Bohn Stafleu Van Loghum, Houten, 287 pages. ISBN 978-90-368-2442-2 (plus online version).
- Henk ten Have (2019): Wounded planet. How declining biodiversity endangers health and how bioethics can help. Johns Hopkins University Press: Baltimore, 355 pages. ISBN 9781421427454.
- Henk ten Have (ed.) (2018): Global education in bioethics. Springer International Publishing, Cham, Switzerland, 198 pages. ISBN 978-3-319-78983-5.
- Ten Have, Henk (ed.) (2016): Encyclopedia of Global Bioethics. Springer International Publishing: Cham, Switzerland, 3 volumes, 3460 pages. ISBN 9783319094847.
- Ten Have, Henk (2016): Global bioethics. An Introduction. Routledge, London and New York, 272 pages, ISBN 978-1-138-12409-7 (hbk). ISBN 978-1-138-12410-3 (pbk). ISBN 978-1-315-64837-8 (ebk).
- Ten Have, Henk (2016): Vulnerability: Challenging bioethics. Routledge, London and New York, 252 pages, ISBN 978-1-138-65266-8 (hbk). ISBN 978-1-138-65267-5 (pbk). ISBN 978-1-315-62406-8 (ebk).
- Ten Have, Henk (ed.) (2015): Bioethics education in a Global Perspective. Springer Publishers, Dordrecht, 221 pages, ISBN 978-94-017-9231-8.
- Ten Have, Henk and Bert Gordijn (eds.) (2014): Handbook of Global Bioethics. Springer Publishers, Dordrecht, 4 volumes, 1650 pages, ISBN 978-94-007-2511-9.
- Ten Have, Henk, Ruud ter Meulen and Evert van Leeuwen (2013): Leerboek Medische Ethiek. [in Dutch; Textbook of Medical Ethics] Bohn Stafleu van Loghum, Houten, 4th revised edition, 357 pages, ISBN 978-90-313-9919-2.
- David F. Kelly, Gerard Magill and Henk ten Have (2013): Contemporary Catholic Healthcare Ethics. Georgetown University Press, Washington DC, 2nd edition, 432 pages, ISBN 978-1-58901-960-7.
- Ten Have, H.A.M.J (2011): Bioethiek zonder grenzen. Mondialisering van gezondheid, ethiek en wetenschap.[in Dutch; Bioethics without borders. Globalisation of health, ethics and science] Valkhof Pers, Nijmegen, 256 pages, ISBN 978 90 5625 3387.
- Ten Have, H.A.M.J. (ed.) (2010): Etica ambiental y politicas internacionales. Ediciones UNESCO, Paris, 238 pages, ISBN 978-92-3-304039-7.
- Ten Have, H.A.M.J., R.H.J. ter Meulen and E.van Leeuwen (2009): Medische ethiek. [in Dutch; Medical Ethics] Derde, herziene druk. Bohn Stafleu Van Loghum, Houten, 326 pag.; ISBN 978-90-313-5208-1.
- Ten Have, H.A.M.J. and Jean, M.S. (eds.) (2009): The UNESCO Universal Declaration on Bioethics and Human Rights. Background, principles and application. UNESCO Publishing, Paris, 370 pages; ISBN 978-92-3-104088-7.

== Awards and honors ==
As Executive Secretary of the European Society for Philosophy of Medicine and Healthcare (ESPMH), ten Have assisted in organizing its annual conferences. In 1989 in Częstochowa, Poland, the third conference was held with the theme of “European traditions in philosophy of medicine.” Czestochowa was chosen due to its history of activity in the field, notably late 19th century activism by Władysław Bieganski, medical doctor and philosopher. For his efforts, later that year Henk ten Have received the City’s Medal of Honor, as well as the Bieganski Medal from Towarzystwo Lekarskie Czestochowskie (Medical Association of Czestochowa, Poland).

In 1995, ten Have was elected as Miembro Correspondiente en el Extranjero, Real Academia Nacional de Medicine, Madrid, Spain. He was also elected as Corresponding Member of the Royal Netherlands Academy of Arts and Sciences in 2005.

Henk ten Have was awarded a visiting Professorship at the University of Central Lancashire, Preston, United Kingdom (1996–1999). He was Senior Visiting Fellow, Center for Health Policy and Ethics, Creighton University, Omaha, Nebraska, USA (March–June 2001). He was appointed as an Honorary Research Professor in the School of Philosophy, University of Tasmania, Australia (2007–2010). Henk ten Have received the Oscar M. Ruebhausen Visiting Professorship, Department of Bioethics, Case Western Reserve University, Cleveland, U.S.A. (September 2008). From 2011 to 2019 he was adjunct professor at King Saud bin Abdulaziz University for Health Sciences (Department of Bioethics, King Abdullah International Medical Research Center), Riyadh, Saudi Arabia.

In 2008, ten Have was awarded a Doctor Honoris Causa degree by the Medical University Pleven in Bulgaria. The same year he received the Ethos Prize for Bioethics, sponsored by the Calouste Gulbenkian Foundation in Lisbon, Portugal. He was elected as Fellow of the Hastings Center (New York, United States) in 2004.

In 2015 Henk ten Have was appointed as ‘Lifetime Honorary Member’ of the Bangladesh Bioethics Society. In 2017 he was appointed as Corresponding Member of the Pontifical Academy for Life, Vatican City.

== Activities ==
=== IAEE ===
Henk ten Have is one of the founders of the International Association for Education in Ethics, established in April 2011. He has been its Secretary and Treasurer until 2020.

The International Association for Education in Ethics will provide an international platform to: (a) exchange and analyze experiences with the teaching of ethics in various educational settings; (b) promote the development of knowledge and methods of ethics education; (c) function as a global center of contacts for experts in the field, and promote contacts between the members from countries around the world, and (d) enhance and expand the teaching of ethics at national, regional and international levels. IAEE has legally been established in Pennsylvania. The secretariat and treasury of the association are housed in the Center for Healthcare Ethics at Duquesne University in Pittsburgh, U.S.A. The association has organized International Conferences in 2012 (Pittsburgh, U.S.A.), 2014 (Ankara, Turkey), 2015 (Curitiba, Brazil), 2016 (Logroño, Spain), 2017 (Mangalore, India), 2018 (Stellenbosch, South Africa) and 2019 (Porto, Portugal).

=== International Journal of Ethics Education ===
The official journal of the International Association for Education in Ethics, the International Journal of Ethics Education has started to be published in 2016 with two annual issues. Henk ten Have is Editor-in-Chief.

=== Medicine, Health Care and Philosophy ===
This is the official journal of the European Society for Philosophy of Medicine and Healthcare (ESPMH). The ESPMH was established in August 1987 by a group of European scholars, interested in cooperation in the field of philosophy and ethics of medicine and healthcare. Henk ten Have was elected as Executive-Secretary of the new organization. The first annual conference took place in 1987 in Maastricht, the Netherlands with the theme ‘The growth of medical knowledge.’

Henk ten Have, as executive secretary, started a bi-annual newsletter in 1987 that developed into a more expanded bulletin. Because more and more ESPMH members were interested in publishing, the initiative was taken to create a new and real journal, entitled Medicine, Health Care and Philosophy. The journal started in 1998. Henk ten Have was the first Editor-in-Chief until 2003. He again became Editor-in-chief (with Bert Gordijn) in 2010.

=== Advancing Global Bioethics ===
Henk ten Have took the initiative (together with Bert Gordijn) to create a new book series in the field of global bioethics. Advancing Global Bioethics provides a forum for normative analysis of a vast range of important new issues in bioethics from a truly global perspective and with a cross-cultural approach. The series started in 2014 and includes now 15 volumes. Henk ten Have and Bert Gordijn are editors of the series.

== Videos ==
- February 2020 "Artificial intelligence and ethics" EWTN, Rome
- July 2018 "Global bioethics and education Pontifical Academy for Life
- October 2016 "Palliative sedation: European Perspectives" University of Chicago
- April 2014 "Vulnerability – Challenges to bioethics in a global context" Creighton University Medical Center, Omaha
- September 2008 "Why do we need bioethics?" Lecture, City Club Friday Forum Series, The City Club of Cleveland, Cleveland, USA
