= Start Again =

Start Again may refer to:

== Music ==
=== Albums ===
- Start Again (EP), 2018
- Start Again EP, 2023
- Start Again, a 2004 album by Alfie Zappacosta
- Start Again, a 2013 album by Bill Deasy
- Start Again, a 2005 album by Rhubarb
- Start Again, an album by Ashley Robertson
- Start Again, a 2021 album by Donny Osmond

=== Songs ===
- “Start Again” (Ai song), 2022
- "Start Again" (Conrad Sewell song), 2015
- "Start Again" (OneRepublic song), 2018
- "Start Again", a song by Vanessa Williams from Next
- "Start Again", a song by Bret Michaels from Rock My World
- "Start Again", a song by Red from Innocence & Instinct
- "Start Again", a song by Ben Haenow from Ben Haenow
- "Start Again", a 1994 song by Stevie Salas
- "Start Again", a song by Lindisfarne from Sleepless Nights
- "Start Again", a 1998 song by The Montrose Avenue
- "Start Again", a 1997 song by Teenage Fanclub, covered by Counting Crows and Death Cab for Cutie
- "Start Again", a song by Fleetwood Mac, see Future Games
- "Start Again", a song by Alive Like Me from Only Forever
- "Start Again", a song by Professional Murder Music from Looking Through
- "Start Again", a song by The Folk Implosion from Take a Look Inside
- "Start Again", a song by Ayria from Debris
- "Start Again", a song by Harvey "Tex" Thomas Young, see Live at Lincoln Hall
- "Start Again", a song by The Electric Soft Parade from Holes in the Wall
- "Start Again", a song by Stan Walker and Samantha Jade from the Born to Dance soundtrack
- "Start Again", a song by War Tapes from The Continental Divide
- "Start Again", a song by the John Butler Trio, see Grand National
- "Start Again", a song by Ian McCulloch from Candleland
- "Start Again", a song by Rico Blanco from Your Universe
- "Start Again", a song by James Walsh from Lullaby
- "Start Again", a song by Annette Ducharme, theme song of the CBC Television teen soap opera Edgemont
- "Start Again", a song by Chris Lake
- "Start Again", a 2011 song by Sam Tsui
- "Start Again", a song by Nick Harper from Riven
- "Start Again", a song by Look See Proof
- "Start Again", a song by Bishop Allen
- "Start Again", a song by The Rabble from The Battle's Almost Over
- "Start Again", a song by Passion Killers from Bullshit Detector
- "Start Again", a song by The Blue Nile
- "Start Again", a song by Hardline from Leaving the End Open
- "Start Again", a song by Starpool
- "Start Again", a song by Bada
- "Start Again", a song by Tokimonsta, featuring Shing02
- "Start Again", a song by Eddie Bitar, featuring Christina Novelli
- "Start Again", a song by Ty Tabor from Trip Magnet
- "Start Again", a song by Driver Friendly from Unimagined Bridges
- "Start Again", a song by The Aston Shuffle feat. Lovers Electric from Sessions Eight
- "Start Again", a 2014 single by Hiroshi Kamiya

== See also ==
- Restart (disambiguation)
- Start Over (disambiguation)
