= Medicine, Health Care and Philosophy =

- Discipline: Health care, philosophy, bioethics
- Language: English
- Edited by: Bert Gordijn, Henk ten Have

Publication details
- Former names: European Philosophy of Medicine and Health Care
- History: 1987–present
- Publisher: Springer Science+Business Media/European Society for Philosophy of Medicine and Healthcare
- Frequency: Quarterly
- Impact factor: 1.450 (2018)

Standard abbreviations
- ISO 4: Med. Health Care Philos.

Indexing
- CODEN: MHCPF5
- ISSN: 1386-7423 (print); 1572-8633 (web)
- LCCN: sn99040981
- OCLC no.: 40820601

Links
- Journal homepage; Online archive

Medicine, Health Care and Philosophy is a quarterly peer-reviewed medical journal covering the intersection of philosophy and medicine, including bioethics.

== History ==
The journal was established in 1987 as European Philosophy of Medicine and Health Care, obtaining its current name in 1998. It is published by Springer Science+Business Media in association with the European Society for Philosophy of Medicine and Healthcare, of which it is the official journal.

The editors-in-chief are Bert Gordijn (Dublin City University) and Henk ten Have (Duquesne University). According to the Journal Citation Reports, the journal has a 2018 impact factor of 1.450.
