= Stjepan Orešković =

Croatian researcher

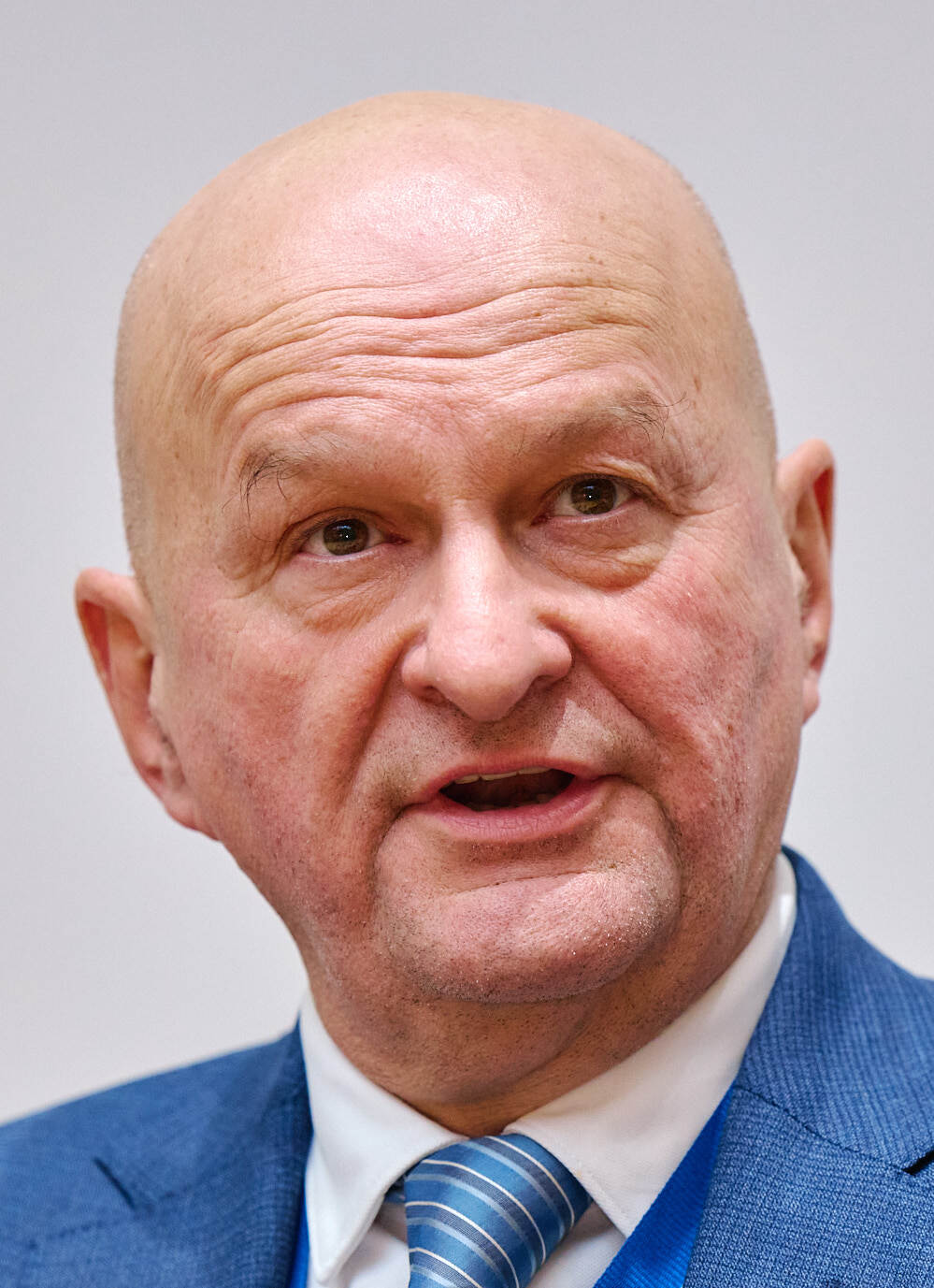
- Stjepan Orešković in 2024
- Born: February 7, 1960 (age 66)
- Education: University of Zagreb
- Occupations: Academic, businessman
- Known for: Majority shareholder of Bosqar Invest; President of IEDC-Bled School of Management
- Spouse: Manica Pirc Oreškovic
- Children: 3
- Awards: Order of the Croatian Star (1996); Global Research Award for Nicotine Dependence (2017); MBA Award (2020); Nikola Tesla Award (2023); Great Charter of Croatian-Turkish Friendship (2024)

Stjepan Orešković (born February 7, 1960) is a professor at the University of Zagreb School of Medicine. Orešković is a member of the European Academy of Sciences and Arts and president of the IEDC - Bled School of Management supervisory board. He is also the majority shareholder of Bosqar Invest.

== Early life and athletic career ==
Orešković's family comes from Lika-Senj County. His paternal grandfather, Mile Orešković, emigrated to the United States in 1921, but returned to Croatia. He taught Stjepan English, Italian and French.

In his youth, Orešković was a member of the Athletic Club Dinamo Zagreb's track and field team. He won several titles at the Croatian junior championships. He participated in veteran athletic, street races, marathons and semi marathons.

=== Leadership role in sports ===
Orešković was the president of the Athletic Club Dinamo (2008–2015) and vice-president of the Croatian Athletics Federation (2012–2016).

== Media career ==
While at university, Orešković wrote for "Studentski list," where he became editor-in-chief. He later wrote for national and regional magazines and contributed columns to the Huffington Post, co-authoring a book on the intersection of science and university development with Sebastian Porsdam Mann and Julie Reuben of Harvard University published by Cambridge University Press. Orešković has also advised LSE Health's Eurohealth and the Croatian Medical Journal, and was an associate editor for Frontiers in Public Health and Psychiatry, focusing on public mental health.

From 2004 to 2012, he was CEO of Europapress Holding, a media conglomerate in Southeast Europe with a portfolio of different print publications, including Metro, Forbes, Cosmopolitan and various online portals. Europapress Holding was a joint venture with WAZ, a German media company.

== Academic career ==
Orešković completed his undergraduate studies at the Faculty of Philosophy at the University of Zagreb, graduating in 1982.

He then switched to gerontology at the Andrija Štampar School of Public Health, part of the Medical Faculty of the University of Zagreb. His research analyzed the growth and health dynamics of the elderly in post-industrial societies and was published under the title "Contemporary Gerontology Between Natural Science and Holistic Concepts of Health and Aging".

Orešković earned a PhD in Medical Sociology. His doctoral research focused on post-structuralist, sociobiological and social-constructionist understanding of man in Post-Freidson medical sociology and was published in the book New Social Contract: Medical Sociology and the Life Sciences.

Orešković was appointed a Fellow in Bioethics at the Harvard Medical School (HMS) Department of Global Health and Social Medicine. He is also a Fellow at the Institute of Coaching (IOC) at McLean, a member of Mass Brigham, the largest affiliate of Harvard Medical School.

== Business career ==
Together with his wife Manica Pirc Oreškovic, Orešković is the majority shareholder of Bosqar Invest (previously known as Mplus Group until June 2024), a conglomerate with investments in business processes and technology, agri-food, talent development, e-commerce and education in Europe and Central Asia. Bosqar Invest has more than 16,000 employees in 17 countries. It is the second largest employer in Croatia.

Bosqar Invest has received financial investments from Croatian and regional pension and investment funds, MidEuropa Partners and the European Bank for Reconstruction and Development. The company is listed on the Zagreb Stock Exchange.

In 2022, Bosqar Invest became the first company in Croatia to issue a sustainability linked bond. As part of the bond issue, the company committed to reducing its greenhouse gas emissions by 25% and increasing the presence of women in management positions to 51%.

Mplus Group is a general sponsor of the Croatian National Theater and Hrabri telefon, a non-profit organization that helps abused and neglected children.

== Academic and research contributions ==
Orešković is the founder and director of the World Health Organization Collaborating Centre for HIV Strategic Information. He has worked with professionals, academics and policy makers from 111 countries and has trained over 2600 students. He was the director of the Andrija Štampar School of Public Health.

In 2023, Orešković was elected as a member of the European Academy of Sciences and Arts.

He holds a tenured professorship at the University of Zagreb School of Medicine and has led numerous educational, research, and consulting initiatives. Orešković has taught at the London School of Economics & Political Science, the London School of Hygiene and Tropical Medicine, the Richard M. Fairbanks Indiana University School of Public Health, Bocconi University, the University of Trieste, and the University of Ljubljana. He was also a fellow at the Blavatnik Institute for Global Health and Social Medicine at Harvard Medical School and at the Institute for Coaching at McLean Hospital, an affiliate of Harvard Medical School.

Between 2017 and 2022, he served as Principal Investigator for Pfizer's "Varenicline Versus Cytisine for Smoking Cessation - A Randomized Controlled Trial," a project involving 70 clinical, behavioral, and data science experts from Harvard Medical School, Massachusetts General Hospital, the University of Ljubljana, and the Medical Faculty of the University of Zagreb.

Orešković has published with academic publishers including Springer Publishing, Elsevier Science, Wiley-Blackwell, Pergamon Press, John Wiley and Sons and Cambridge University Press.

His works about tobacco control, obesity prevention, Internet addiction, and surveillance of HIV and SARS-CoV-2 have been published in journals such as The Lancet and BMJ, and covered by media outlets such as the Huffington Post, Reuters, CNN, BBC, NBC, and RTL.

Oreškovićs is also the director of the Center for Research of Best Practice in Healthcare at the University of Zagreb Medical School. He has served as a consultant to the World Bank, the European Union Commission, and the World Health Organization. He co-chairs the Data Science and the Right to Science Conference, which fosters interdisciplinary dialogue among social, behavioral, and life scientists to explore the potential of a new data science framework and its applications in health and biotechnology.

In 2025, Orešković co-authored an open letter published in The Lancet that advocated for continued and strengthened support for the World Health Organization. The letter was signed by 479 global health experts.

== Personal life ==
Orešković is married to Manica Pirc Orešković and they have three children.

== Awards ==
Orešković was awarded the Order of the Croatian Star with the effigy of Katarina Zrinska for his contributions to health care, social welfare and the promotion of social moral values presented by the president of the Republic of Croatia in April 1996. He was also awarded the Global Research Award for Nicotine Dependence by Global Research Awards for Nicotine Dependence (GRAND) – Pfizer Pharmaceuticals in 2017.

In December 2020, he received the MBA Award for the Promotion of Knowledge and Links Between Science and Entrepreneurship. Orešković won the Nikola Tesla Award for Ethical Business Practices, presented by Transparency International in 2023 and in October 2024 the Great Charter of Croatian-Turkish Friendship.
