= Starters (novel) =

2012 novel by Lissa Price

- First edition
- Author: Lissa Price
- Language: English
- Publisher: Delacorte Press
- Publication date: March 12, 2012
- Pages: 352 ppg
- ISBN: 0385742371
- Followed by: Enders

Starters is a novel by Lissa Price. The book was published on March 12, 2012, by Delacorte Press and has been published in English, German, Greek, Dutch, Italian, French, Portuguese, Turkish and Spanish. The sequel is a book entitled Enders, with screen rights to the series currently being shopped. Price stated that she came up with the idea for the novel after trying to receive a flu shot; she was turned away due to a lack of available vaccines.

== Plot ==
Starters takes place in a futuristic Los Angeles, where a biological weapon has killed everyone not vaccinated against it. The only ones that survive the attack are either under 20 or over 60 years of age, due to being given priority for the vaccine before the war. The term "Starters" refers to those under the age of 20, while "Enders" is used to describe the survivors over the age of 60. Because Starters are underage and not allowed to work, many of them are starving and desperate, not having funds to afford necessities. Some Starters have heard of an illegal way to earn money by allowing Enders to temporarily inhabit their bodies via a neuro-chip implanted by the Body Bank.

Sixteen-year-old Callie is one such Starter, who has lived in abandoned buildings with her brother Tyler and friend Michael thus far to survive. When her temporary home is smoked out and cleared of people, she resorts to the Body Bank in order to provide for the three of them. She is startled to awaken in the life of a rich Ender after her neurochip malfunctions. Callie initially relishes the chance to live a lavish life where she wants for nothing and even finds herself dating the grandson of a U.S. Senator, but soon discovers that the Ender she's linked to has big plans to bring down the Body Bank, and not everyone she meets is what they seem.

== Reception ==
Reception for Starters has been positive, with the Los Angeles Times calling it "well executed". Publishers Weekly also praised the book, but criticized the audiobook narrator's voices for the female characters as "melodramatic".
