= Start (Polish camera) =

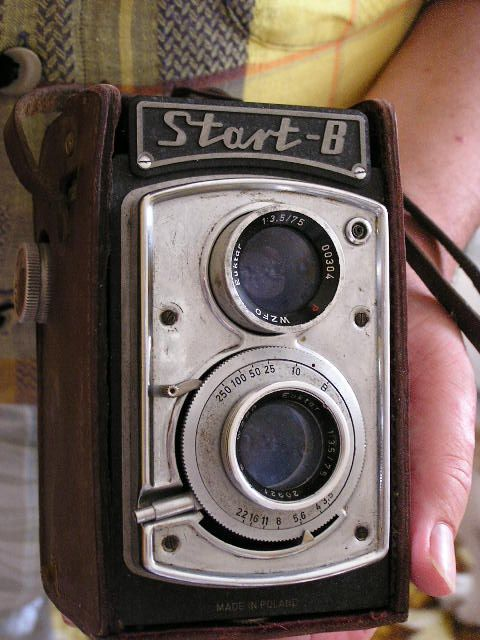
Start B

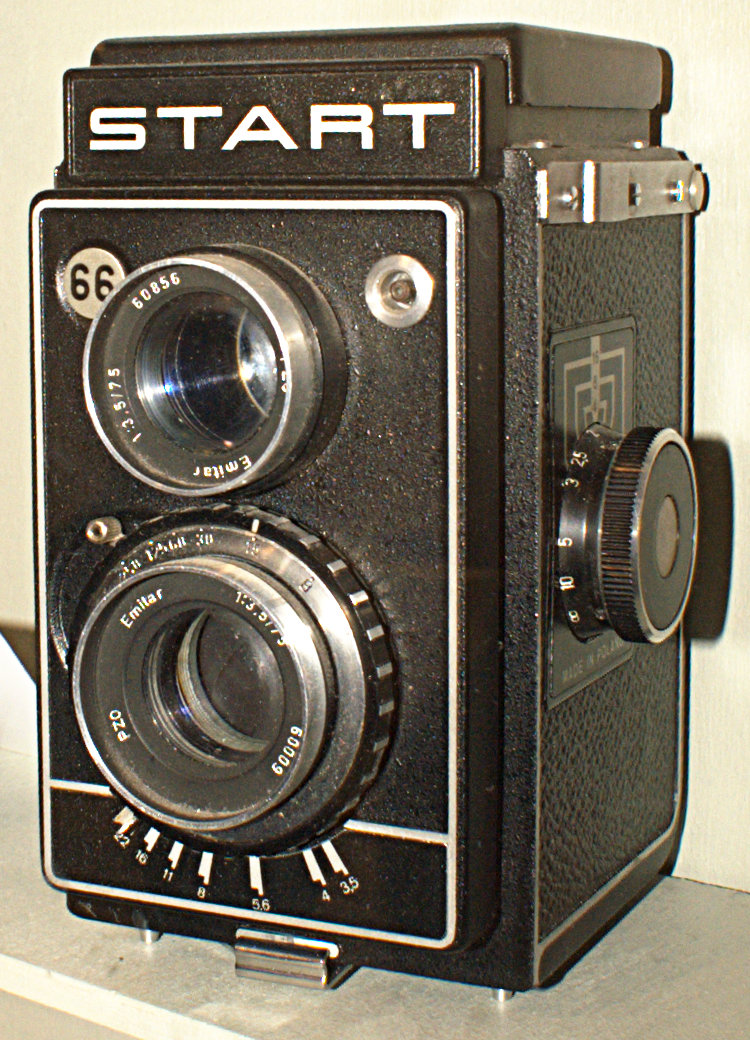
Start 66

Start was a Polish twin-lens reflex camera of Rolleicord type produced by Warsaw Photo-Optical Works, or WZFO. It was the first camera produced in Poland after World War II. The Start range was produced in numerous versions – Start, Start II, Start B, Start 66 and Start 66S.

Start 66S was exported outside of the Poland under names "NOCO flex" and "Universa Uniflex 66".

== Camera editions ==
- Start (1951–1952, 1954–1960)
- Start II (1960–1965)
- Start B (1960–1967)
- Start 66 (1967–1970)
- Start 66S (ca. 1970–1982)

== See also ==
- Media related to Start cameras at Wikimedia Commons
