= Restart (Restart album) =

Studio album by Restart
- Released: November 2009
- Recorded: 2009; Estúdio Artmix
- Genres: Pop rock, teen pop
- Length: 30:55
- Language: Portuguese
- Label: Radar Records
- Producer: Guto Campos

Restart chronology
Restart (2009)	By Day (2010)

Singles from Restart
- 1. "Recomeçar" Released: November 2009; 2. "Levo Comigo" Released: April 2010; 3. "Vou Cantar" Released: October 2010

Restart is the debut studio album by Brazilian pop rock band Restart, released in November 2009. It was released digitally May 20, 2010 via iTunes.

The album was commercially successful with its first single, "Recomeçar", which entered top-ten positions in Brazilian charts, It charted #2 in Top 20 ABPD. More than 100,000 copies have been sold, being certified Platinum by ABPD.

== Track list ==
No.	Title	Music	Length
1.	"Recomeçar" (Restart)	Lucas Kobayashi	3:18
2.	"Vou Cantar" (I Will Sing)		2:57
3.	"Amanhecer No Teu Olhar" (Sunrise In Your Eyes)		3:06
4.	"Sobre Eu E Você" (About Me and You)		3:14
5.	"Levo Comigo" (I Carry With Me)		3:28
6.	"Ao Teu Lado" (By Your Side)		2:56
7.	"O Meu Melhor" (My Very Best)		3:13
8.	"Lembranças" (Memories)		2:34
9.	"Final Feliz" (Happy Ending)		3:34
10.	"Bye Bye"		2:33
11.	"Nosso Verão" (Our Summer)		3:26
