= Restart (band) =

Brazilian pop rock band

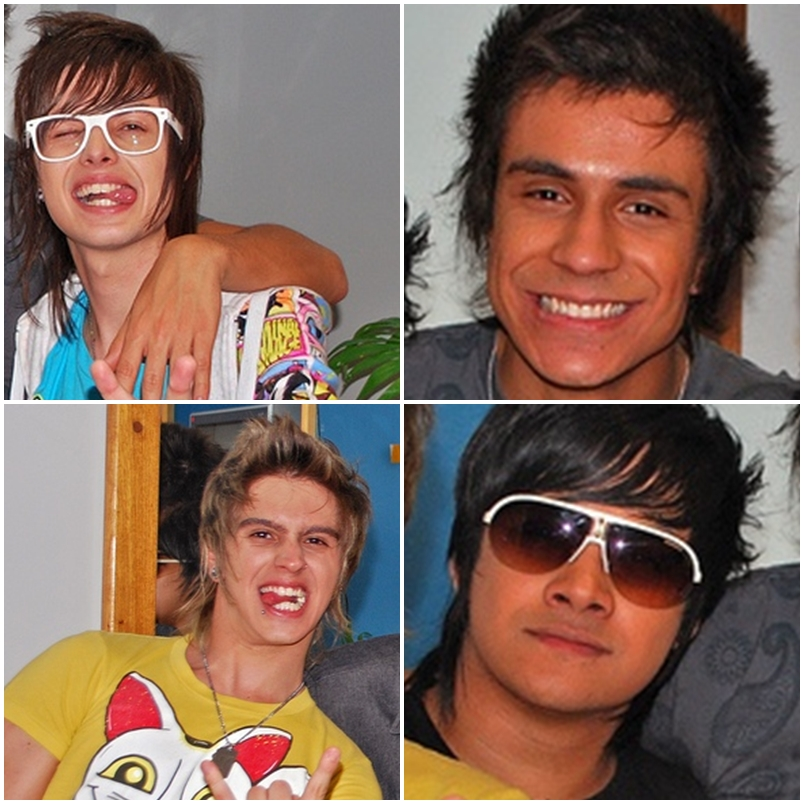
- Restart in 2009. Clockwise from top left: Pe Lanza, Pe Lu, Koba, Thomas

Background information
- Origin: São Paulo, Brazil
- Genres: Pop rock; teen pop
- Years active: 2008–2015; 2023 (farewell tour)
- Past members: Pe Lanza; Pe Lu; Koba; Thomas
- Website: bandarestart.com.br

Restart was a Brazilian pop rock band that independently formed the subgenre of happy rock in São Paulo in August 2008. It became one of the best known bands in the country at the time, and had been touted as being one of the pioneers in the use of colored clothing, especially in regard to their pants apparel. The band's first album was released in November 2009, entitled Restart. It has three singles – "Recomeçar", "Levo Comigo" and "Pra Você Lembrar".

Their colorful fashion trend competed with the so-called música colorida (colorful music) subculture in Brazil – seen in the youth of Brazil as well as much of Latin America. These teens are called coloridos for being fans of Restart's genre of music, which is a subgenre of indie rock that was underground in nature and with only few supporters in big cities like Curitiba, and São Paulo, being unknown to those fans of metal and rock in Brazil, the so called "rockeiros" (Brazilian rockers). There has been a certain Brazilian anti-Pop and negative reception towards the band, with a particular aversion to the apparel and fashion of the band (in spite of being an independent band, Restart is widely criticized for its distance to such notable ideologies as Do it yourself, and labeling themselves as creators of a unique and innovative form of rock, but not cultivating this musical genre). Dinho Ouro Preto, Capital Inicial, a famous Brazilian musician, has made several criticisms against Restart. Felipe Neto, a famous Brazilian blogger, was also very critical of the band Restart and the "colorful" movement that they promoted. He has since apologized for his statements about the band.

On March 17, 2015, after almost 7 years together, the band announced a hiatus.

== Members ==
- Pe Lu – lead vocals, rhythm guitar
- Pe Lanza – lead vocals, bass
- Koba – lead guitar, backing vocals
- Thomas – drums

== Discography ==
=== Studio albums ===
- Restart (2009)
- By Day (2010)
- Geração Z (2011)

== Controversy ==
A controversy surrounding the band was raised by the lead singer of Detonautas. Tico Santa Cruz accused the band of opportunism, emphasizing that they were charging money to get fans in their dressing rooms after their performances.

On March 9, 2011, a video of the band's drummer, Thomas D'Avila, was released on YouTube, allegedly offending the inhabitants of the state of Amazonas. The video showed an interview in which Thomas was asked about a place where he would like to perform. In response, the drummer said he would like to go to Amazonas to "play in the jungle."

"I would really like to perform in Amazonas. Imagine playing in the middle of the jungle, like, I don’t know, I don’t know what the people there are like, I don’t know if there are people, civilization. For me, it would be awesome to play for them, for the place that we think doesn’t have anything".

— Thomas, during an interview, referring to the Brazilian state of Amazonas

This statement caused unease among the inhabitants of the state and north of the country. In Manaus, some protests against the band took place. Among the protests was the Popular Movement Game Over Ignorance, composed of city youth.

A few days after the D'Avila's statement, the producer, Mega Events, responsible for organizing the show for the band in Manaus, canceled the performance of Restart. In an issued statement, the company brought up the subject of "public policy" for such a procedure.

== See also ==
- Puta falta de sacanagem
