= Goan Catholic literature =

16th-century Roman Catholic Church literature

Goan Catholic literature is diverse.

== Missionary literature ==
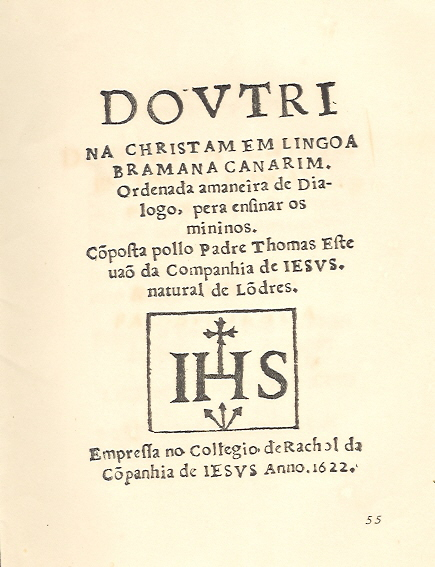
Cover of Doutrina Christam by Fr. Thomas Stephens, published work in Konkani, and any Indian language

The indigenous population of the erstwhile overseas Portuguese colony of Goa underwent a large scale conversion to Roman Catholicism after its conquest and occupation by the Portuguese Empire, which was led by the famous voyager and adventurer Afonso de Albuquerque on 25 February 1510. It was necessary for Catholic missionaries to learn the local Konkani language in order to carry out evangelic activities. Hence, during the 16th and 18th century, Catholic missionaries and priests contributed a lot for Goan Catholic literature by composing and publishing books in Konkani, as manual of devotion for converts.

The origin of their literature dates to 1563 when the first Konkani grammar was published by Fr.Andre Vaz at St.Paulo College at Old Goa. Konkani language had its first Konkani-Portuguese dictionary in 1567. Missionary priests of Rachol Seminary compiled the first ever dictionary in any Indian language giving 15000 Konkani words and their vocables in Portuguese. Konkani was known as Canarim in early Portuguese writings on Goa. In 1622, Thomas Stephens (1549–1619) an English Jesuit published Doutrina Christam em lingoa Bramana Canarim, ordenada a maneira de dialogo, pera ensinar os mininos, por Thomas Estevao, Collegio de Rachol 1622 (Christian Doctrines in the Canarese Brahmin Language, arranged in dialogue to teach children, by Fr. Thomas Stephens, College of Rachol, 1622) which was the first book in Konkani and any Indian language. Mariano Saldhana published a facsimile edition of this book entitled as Doutrina Cristâ em lingua Concani pot Tomás Estévão in 1945. Thomas Stephens also published the Arte da Lingoa Canarim (A Grammar of Konkani, 1640), with its second edition the Gramatica da Lingua Concani Composta Pelo Padre Thomas Estevão (A Grammar of Konkani language composed by Fr. Thomas Stephens) published in 1856. and Declaraçam da Doutrina Christam (Exposition of Christian Doctrine in Konkani, 1632) in Goa. Jesuit missionaries also produced works during the 17th century in a mix of Marathi and Konkani like the Krista Purana (The Christian Purânna) in 1616, 1649, and 1654, but no copies of any of these editions are extant. The 'Krista Purana' (The Christian Purânna) is a Marathi-Konkani metrical composition, consisting of 10,962 strophes; divided into two parts treating of the Old and the New Testament respectively. Paixao de Cristo (Passion of Christ) known as Christi Vilapika in Marathi, written by during the 17th century in Marathi language and Roman script, based on sublime pathos of the crucifixion of Jesus Christ and the Chilayabal Vilapika.

In 1626, Diogo Reberio (1560–1633), a Portuguese Jesuit, compiled the Vocabulario da lingoa Canarim (A Vocabulary of Konkani language) a Konkani-Portuguese and Portuguese-Konkani dictionary at Salcette, Goa, its manuscript is found at the Central Library, Panjim, Goa. It comprises 14,000 principal lexical entries. It was in the form of three manuscripts, each different from the other. In 1973, Junta de Investigações do Ultramar published in Lisbon a seventeenth-century Konkani dictionary called Vocabulario da Lingoa Canarina Com versam Portugueza, which is a revised and enlarged version of Reberio's Vocabulario. A manuscript at the Ajuda library in Lisbon entitled Vocabulario (Canarim) da lingoa da Terra, Composto pelo Padre Diogo Reberio da Comphania de Jesu do uzo do Padre Amaro de Azevedo tresladado a sua custa also based on Reberio's Vocabulario. In 1982, professor L.A. Rodrigues of Santa Cruz, Goa discovered the Vocabulario da lingoa Canarim, feito pellos Padres da Comphania de Jesus que residião da Christandade de Salcete e novamente acressentado com varios de falar pelo Padre Diogo Reberio de Comphania. Anno 1626. However it does not differ from the Central Library Vocabulario copy and hence is considered the second copy of Reberio's Vocabulario. Christovão de Jesus wrote the Grammatica da Bramana (1635).

In 1857 Dr. Joaquim Heliodoró da Cunha Rivara (1800–79) published the Ensiao Historico da Lingua Concani (Historical Essay on Konkani language). Mgr Sebastião Rodolfo Dalgado (1855–1922) produced works such as A Konkani-Portuguese, Philological and Etmological Dictionary (1893), A Portuguese-Konkani Dictionary (1905), A Bouquet of Konkani Proverbs (1922) and the unpublished A Grammar of Konkani language (1922), with its manuscript preserved in the Central Library, Panjim. Gaspar De Sam Miguel's undated Sintaxis Copiozissima na Lingua Brahmana e Polida with its manuscript in the University of London. In Goa, Amcho Soddvonddar (Our Saviour, Jesus the Messiah, 1952) was popular. In Goa, the Salesians started Aitarachem Vachop, a Konkani weekly.

== Other literature ==
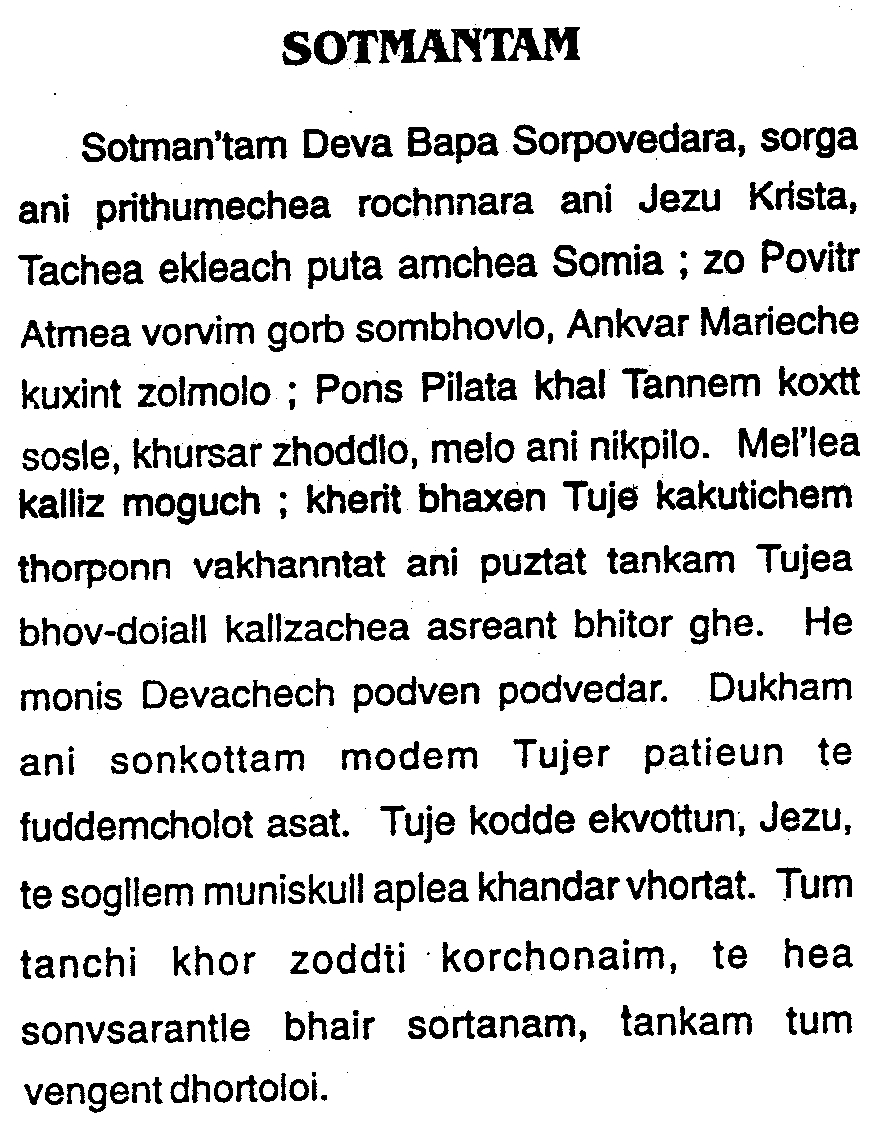
Devanagari script is the official script for Koṅkaṇī, although the Roman script is used for religious and other purposes.

Goan Catholics have immensely contributed towards Media Activities in Goa, Bombay, and Karachi. In 1556, the first printing press was established in Goa and on 22 December 1821 the first periodical Gazeta de Goa (Goa Gazetteer), was published with Antonio Jose de Lima Leitao being its founder-editor. On 22 January 1900, the first Portuguese newspaper in Goa, O Heraldo was started by Prof. Messias Gomes, which was transformed into an English daily in 1987. Popular Konkani periodicals published in Goa include Amcho Ganv (1930) by Luis de Menezes, Amigo do Povo (People's friend, 1916) by S.X. Vaz, Antonio V. De Cruz's Ave Maria (1920), Amcho Sonvsar (Our World, 1928) by J.C.F de Souza, Goencho Porzoll (1982) by Joao Inacio de Souza, Goyche Xetkamoti (Goan Farmers) by J.A. Fernandes, Sangatti (1934), a magazine by F.P. Martryer were published. In 1911, the first Konkani novel Kristanv Ghorabo (Christian home) by Eduardo José Bruno de Souza was published. His also produced various works such as Kristanvanchi Dotorn Goyenche Bhaxen (Christian doctrine in the language of Goa, 1897), Eva ani Mori (Eve and Mary, 1899), Piedade Saibinichim ani sabar dusrim Gaenam (Our Lady of Piety Hymns and Several Others, 1901), Primeira Cartilha do Alphabeto Mariano (First book of Marian Alphabet, 1905), Monti Saibinichim ani sabar dusrim Gaenam (Our Lady of Mount's hymns and several others), Ressurecção do Concani (Resurrection of Konkani), Khuxalponnacho ghorabo and Ponchtis Kunvor (Happy family and thirty five princes), and Sorgacho Thevo (Treasure of Heaven). According to R. Kelkar author of A Bibliography of Konkani literature in Devnargri, Roman and Kannada characters (1963) lists that there are over 1000 Goan Catholic Konkani works in Roman script.

From 1892 to 1897, bilingual Konkani-Portuguese weeklies such as A Luz, O Bombaim Esse, O Luo, O Intra Jijent, O Opiniao Nacional, while Konkani-English periodicals like Goa Mail (1919) by Dr. Vasco da Gama and F.X. Afonso, Goa Times (1919), which later only Konkani were published. Popular Portuguese-Konkani periodicals included Porecho Adhar (1932) by Joseph Baptist Vaz and Padre Jose Vaz by Francis Xavier D'Costa. In 1919, Amigo do Povo (1916) and O Goano (1916) were combined and named O Amigo do Povo Goano. Popular Konkani newspapers and magazines like Vauraddeancho Ixxt (The worker's friend, 1933) by Fr. Arcenio Fernandes and Fr. Graciano Gomes. It was then edited by L.A. Fernandes and later by Fr.Lactancio Almeida, while it is presently run by the Society of the Missionaries of St. Francis Xavier, Pilar, Goa. Other newspapers included Konknni Bulletin by Antonio Vincente D'Cruz, Gulab and Goencho Avaz, which became a fortnightly after one and a half year, by Fr. Freddy J. da Costa.

After Liberation of Goa, Felicio Cardoso started a weekly named Goencho Sad and later changed it to Sot. In 1963, Ameterio Pais, started a weekly Uzvadd. In 1967, two weeklies were Sot and A Vida were combined by Felicio Cardoso to form Divtti, a daily, which he later transformed into a weekly Loksad. Post-anexxion journalism flourished, through the advent of periodicals like Novo Uzvadd and Prokas by Evágrio Jorge, Goencho Avaz, and later changed to Goenchem Kirnam (1980) by Fr. Planton Faria. Currently, the Goan Review is the only Konkani-English bimonthly, operating from Mumbai, edited by Fausto V. da Costa, and the Konkan Mail started from Panjim, with Cyril D'Cunha and Jose Salvador Fernandes editing the English and Konkani sections respectively. Dacho Furtad introduced two new dictionaries, the New Konkani-English Pocket Dictionary (1930) and Concanim–Inglez Dicionar (Konkani-English Pocket Dictionary, 1999).

In Bombay, Konkani periodicals such as O Concani, a weekly by Sebastiāo Jesus Dias, Sanjechem Noketr (The Evening star) (1907) by B. F. Cabral, O Goano (1907) by Honarato Furtado and Francis Futardo, divide into three sections: Portuguese, Konkani and English, Popular Magazine by first as monthly then a fortnightly and Ave Maria (1919), a Konkani-English-Portuguese trilingual edited by Antonio D'Cruz were published. In February 1899, Udentenchem Sallok (Lotus of the East), a Konkani-Portuguese bilingual by Eduardo J. Bruno de Souza, the first Konkani periodical was published as a fortnightly in Poona. In Sholapur, the first Konkani book in the Devanagri script Kristanv Doton ani Katisism (1894), by Dr. George Octaviano Pires was published. Other periodicals that took birth Bombay from 1936 to 1950 included Udentechem Nektr (The Morning star), Niz Goa, Jai Gomantak, Gomant Bharti, Voice of Goa, Azad Goem, Sot Uloi, Porjecho Avaz and Ghe Uzvadd were published. Periodicals like Mhojem Magazin, Catholic Indian, Amcho Sonvsar, Novo Jivit, Goenkaracho Ixxt, Porjecho Ulas, Golden Goa, Konkani Times, Sontos, Aitarachem Vachop, O Heraldo, Konknni Journal and Tujem Raj Amkam Ieum were circulated from Bombay. In Karachi, Fr.Ludovico Pereria's monthly Dor Mhoineachi Rotti (Monthly bread, 1915) was published.
