= Francisco Luís Gomes =

Portuguese surgeon and writer (1829–1869)

Francisco Luís Gomes GCC
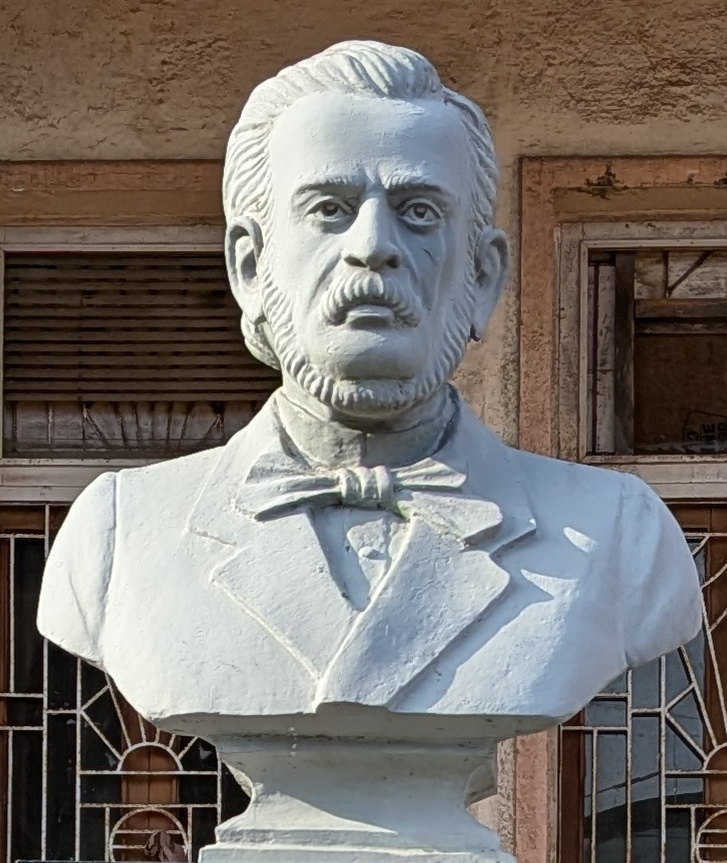
- Bust of Gomes in Margao, Goa

Member of the Cortes Gerais
- In office 1861–1869
- Constituency: Margão

Personal details
- Born: 31 May 1829 Navelim, Goa, Portuguese India
- Died: 30 September 1869 (aged 40) Atlantic Ocean
- Party: Regenerator Party
- Education: Escola Médico-Cirúrgica de Goa (1850)
- Occupation: Surgeon; writer; historian; economist; political scientist; politician

Francisco Luís Gomes GCC (Portuguese: [fɾɐ̃ˈsiʃku luˈiʒ ˈɣomɨʃ]; Goan Konkani: Fransisko Luis Gomes; 31 May 1829 – 30 September 1869) was a Portuguese surgeon, writer, historian, economist, political scientist and MP in the Portuguese parliament. A classical liberal by political orientation, Gomes represented Margão in the Cortes Gerais from 1861 to 1869. His outstanding contributions towards the fields of classical liberal philosophy and economics led him to be widely hailed as "The Prince of Intellectuals" in Europe.

== Early life ==
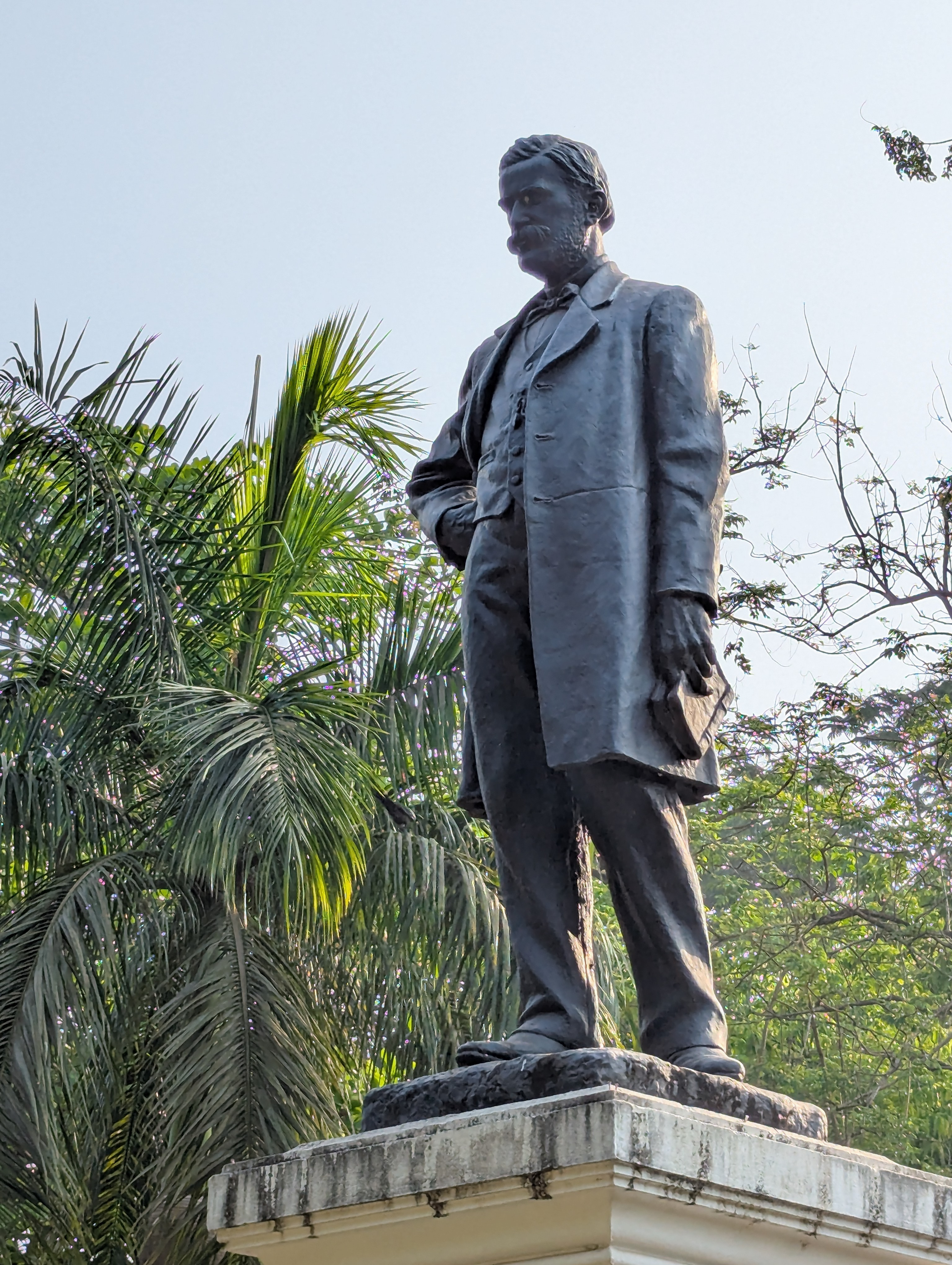
Statue of Francisco Luís Gomes in Panaji, Goa

Francisco Luís Gomes was born on 31 May 1829 in the Colmoroddo vaddo (deanery of a parish) of Navelim village in Salcette concelho, the son of a Goan Catholic Chardo couple, Francisco Salvador Gomes and Deodata Furtado. His father was a physician and civic leader. Gomes spent his early years in Navelim and during this period, displayed a flair for languages. He was a polyglot; highly proficient in the use of Konkani, Portuguese and French, and additionally possessed a good understanding of English, Italian, Spanish, Latin and Marathi. At the age of 21, he completed his medical course at the Escola Médico-Cirúrgica de Goa in Nova Goa. He was soon appointed professor of the institution in view of his academic merits, and also granted a commission in the Portuguese Army. Gomes eventually rose to become the institution's Chief Surgeon in 1860.

== Member of Parliament (1861–1869) ==
Gomes saw it as his life's mission to advance the cause of freedom, truth and justice, and thus followed in his father's footsteps by taking part in civic affairs. In 1860, he stood for election in the Portuguese parliament Cortes Gerais from the constituency of Margão. He was elected to the parliament in 1861 and took a seat with Partido Regenador (Renewing Party), a liberal party. His first speech in parliament made him renowned as a great orator and parliamentarian. Gomes represented Portuguese India until his death in 1869. He was thrice offered a seat in the Cabinet as a Minister, but declined as he found it to be incompatible with his independent views.

Francisco Luís Gomes fought against slavery and defended the cause of the Padroado. He strove for the creation of a society based on the principles of liberty, equality and fraternity, and campaigned against socio-economic injustices committed on the colonised peoples across the Portuguese Empire. He campaigned to ameliorate the conditions of his constituents and his efforts towards this end succeeded in placing colonial public servants on equal standing as public servants in Portugal. Gomes laid down the principles of a Goan budget and expunged it of several illegal items of expenditure.

== Works ==
It is said that the law of Christ governs European civilization. That is a lie. It shines on its surface, but does not penetrate to its entrails.

— Quote from his novel, Os Brâmanes (1866)

Gomes became internationally renowned as an eminent economist and political scientist due to his principal works which were published while he was incumbent in the Cortes Gerais. His view was that economics was inseparable from politics, and as such, he devoted a large part of his life to its study. In 1861, Gomes wrote his first work; a 34-page treatise on the subject in French entitled "De la question du cotton en Angleterre et dans les possessions portugaises d' Afrique Occidentale" (The issue of cotton in England and the Portuguese possessions of West Africa). This work earned him recognition in Europe as an eminent economist.

A second work on the agricultural and rural economy of Goa A liberdade da terra e a economia rural da India portugueza (The freedom of the land and the rural economy of Portuguese India) was published in Portuguese the following year. This work is generally considered to be his magnum opus. In it, Gomes discussed the impact of Portuguese colonial policy on Goan agriculture, as well as the various handicaps of the native agriculturist. He advocated colonial autonomy and a uniform system of colonial administration throughout the Portuguese Empire and suggests a scheme of economic and financial reforms, such as the establishment of Credit societies, which would save the country from economic stagnation. He argued that the comunidades were no longer suited to the exigencies of the time and instead called for the liberation of the lands under their control, and its replacement by individual ownership of the tenant. He also advocated the sale of all public lands, as well as those that belonged to religious institutions.

A third work published in French in 1867, Essai sur la théorie de l'économie politique et de ses rapports avec la morale et le droit (Essay on the theory of political economy and its relationship with morality and the law) was widely praised by European economists. It is generally recognised as one of the most important in the history of Portuguese economic thought recognised by eminent European societies such as Societe d'Economie Politique of Paris, Society of Medical Sciences of Lisbon and the Economic Society of Cádiz.

In 1866, Gomes published his famous historical novel Os Brâmanes (The Brahmins), the first novel by a Goan, which focused on the practise of caste-based discrimination in India, particularly of untouchability among the Hindus. The novel has a purely Indian background and was inspired by the French playwright Victor Hugo. Its theme is centred on the love of liberty, justice and concern for the downtrodden, and focuses on the life of the Anglo-Indian community in the Faizabad district and its relationship with the native inhabitants. It vividly portrays the traditional festivities in Cawnpore, and discusses the causes and effects of the Indian Rebellion of 1857 in great detail. In it, Gomes also alluded to the anti-colonial uprisings by the Ranes in Goa in the statement: "Impartial men who are moved by justice and not by racialism want India to be ruled by Indians". He also criticised the European nations for their perceived lack of adherence to Christian values.

Gomes' other notable works included a biography written in Portuguese of the brigadiers Henrique Carlos Henriques and Joaquim Xavier Henriques, and in French of Sebastião José de Carvalho e Melo, 1st Marquess of Pombal (1869). He cherished his mother-tongue, Konkani, and made significant contributions towards a revised edition of Arte da lingoa Canarim (Art of the Canarim language), the Konkani grammar by the 16th-century English Jesuit, Fr. Thomas Stephens. He also wrote an unpublished Konkani grammar dedicated to the Portuguese civil servant and Konkani revivalist Joaquim Heliodoró da Cunha Rivara.

== Political views ==
I was born in the East Indies, once the cradle of poetry, philosophy and history and now their tomb. I belong to that race which composed the Mahabharata and invented chess. But this nation which made codes of its poems and formulated politics in a game is no longer alive! It survives imprisoned in its own country. I asked for India liberty and light; as for myself, more happy than my countrymen, i am free – civis sum.

— Quote from a letter to the French politician, Alphonse de Lamartine

Gomes was a Romanticist who cherished the concept of liberty. He was a devout Roman Catholic who judged the world according to the ethical standards of his faith, tracing his philosophy of equality to Jesus Christ. Gomes took great pride in his Indian ancestry and advocated the right of Swaraj or self-governance for Indians. On the Indian Rebellion of 1857, he famously stated in Os Brâmanes:

"The movement was throttled because it was a revolt. The revolt was the sepoy; the revolution would have been the people; the revolt was revenge; the revolution would have been the Idea; the revolt was the cruel Vishnu; the revolution would have been the mild Shiva."

Gomes was a staunch Indian nationalist, and contrarily to his Hindu counterparts within Goa and the Indian mainland, based his nationalism within the framework of his Christian religious beliefs and his faith in the superiority of Western culture. He believed the main instruments of civilisation to be two, namely Christianity and education. He was appalled by the perceived "social evils" he found to be prevalent in Hindu society, and saw European civilisation as a panacea for them. While Gomes bemoaned the loss of India's ancient cultural heritage, he believed that the only chance left for the Indian people to have a civilisation of their own laid on colonial rule. At the same time, however, he decried attempts by the Western colonial powers to use their dominant status for the purpose of exploiting, rather than guiding and educating their subjects. Gomes further believed that the European colonial powers should eventually leave and entrust the governance of India to its people, once the period of "tutelage" was over.

Gomes envisioned the building of an invincible nation with both Christian and liberal values of an "enlightened" Europe. He believed that the cause of India's subjugation by European colonial powers laid on India being ridden with rivalries of different dynasties, caste hatred and religious antagonisms. He further believed that with only one religion, only one dynasty, only one caste, India would have been invincible. Gomes wrote regarding Portuguese rule in India that "Portugal converted a portion of India to the Catholic religion with the arms of her soldiers, with the blood of her martyrs, with the miracles of her saints, and with the fires of her Inquisition. Those who were vanquished in this struggle became Christians and Portuguese."

== Honours ==
Gomes was the recipient of numerous honours, in view of his significant contributions in the fields of literature, history, economy and political science. Due to his significant contributions towards the study of political economy, the Society of Economists of Paris appointed him as an Associate Member, a rare honour which he shared with four other eminent personages, namely, William Ewart Gladstone, Mungueti, John Stuart Mill and Richard Cobden. Upon his visit to France on the occasion of the Universal Exhibition held in Paris in 1867, the elite among the French economists and philosophers paid a public tribute to Gomes for his contributions to the study of political economy. The French monarch Napoleon III received him in a special audience and felicitated him for his achievements.

Among other honours, Gomes was appointed Member of the Royal Asiatic Society of Bombay, Member of the Society of Medical Sciences of Lisbon, Member of the Society of Political Economy of Cádiz, Member of the Royal Academy of Sciences of Lisbon, and was awarded the Doctorate of Social and Political Sciences of the Catholic University of Leuven in Belgium. His loyalty to the Portuguese Empire coupled with his love and enthusiasm for the Portuguese language and culture resulted in him being honoured with the knighthood of the Ordem Militar de Nosso Senhor Jesus Cristo by the Portuguese government.

== Death ==
In 1869, Gomes was afflicted with a debilitating illness and his body began to waste. He hoped to spend his remaining days in Goa, and left Europe for British India by the S.S. Messalia on 25 September. 36 hours after entering the Atlantic Ocean, he died on board the ship on 30 September, aged 40. Portuguese writer Júlio Dantas wrote about Gomes' legacy:

"The thinkers or the wise live beyond their death. Theirs is an eternal youth, like trees forever blossoming. I wish to pay my respects to the thinker in him, as well as to the brilliance and immortality in the eternal youth of knowledge."

== Legacy ==
Gomes' home in Margão, Goa lies in disrepair with members of the public, historians and citizens alike, asking the local government to aid its preservation. However, the house continues to be neglected despite the concerns expressed by members of the community who bring up this matter repeatedly and especially on the occasion of the commemorations of the anniversaries of Gomes' birth and death.

== Bibliography ==
- De la question du coton en Angleterre et dans les possessions portugaises de l'Afrique occidentale (in French). Typ. Universal. 1861.
- A liberdade da terra e a economia rural da India portugueza (in Portuguese). Typ. Universal. 1862.
- Os brigadeiros Henrique Carlos Henriques e Joaquim Xavier Henriques (in Portuguese). Typ. Universal. 1863.
- Os Brâmanes: Romance (in Portuguese). Typ. Universal. 1866.
- Essai sur la théorie de l'économie politique et de ses rapports avec la morale et le droit (in French). Guillaumin. 1867.
- Le marquis de Pombal, esquisse de sa vie publique (in French). Imprimerie franco-portugaise. 1869.
