= Mariano Saldanha =

Indian writer and teacher (1878–1975)

- Born: Mariano Jose Luis de Gonzaga Saldanha c. 1878; Ucassaim, Goa, Portuguese India
- Died: 1975 (aged 96–97)
- Occupations: Teacher; writer

Mariano Jose Luis de Gonzaga Saldanha (1878 – 1975) was an Indian writer and teacher. Born in Uskai (Ucassaim) village in Portuguese Goa, he studied medicine and pharmacy, but went on to become a teacher of Marathi and Sanskrit at the Lyceum in Goa (1915–1929) and of Sanskrit and Konkani at Lisbon, at the university and at the Advanced School of Colonial Administration (Instituto Superior de Estudos Ultramarinos) (1929–1946). In 1946-48, he was Deputy Director of the new institute of African and Oriental languages in Lisbon.

== Early life ==
Saldanha owed his linguistic education to his priest-uncles in Goa, who had made a mark in the field of higher education in Goa. The younger one was Manuel Jose Gabriel de Saldanha, author of Historia de Goa (Nova Goa, 1926, repr. New Delhi, 1990). The older one was running a Lyceum in Mapusa. Saldanha took his first strides in the academic field in this lyceum, and discovered his life orientation. He himself acknowledged, in a writing of 1955, that it was his older uncle who got the idea of teaching him Marathi, that this was the beginning of his career as teacher of Indian languages. Saldanha went on to study medicine and pharmacy at the Escola Medico-Cirurgica of Goa.

== Advocate of Konkani ==
In his Presidential Address at the 5th Conference of the Konkani Bhasha Mandal at Bombay in 1952, he held that Marathi and Konkani were independent sister languages. He also, at this early date, advocated primary education in Konkani for Goans. He also made a plea for the adoption of the Roman script in the system of transliteration invented by Thomas Stephens and followed by other writers in the 17th century in Goa. However, his advocacy of Konkani did not translate into hostility to Marathi.

It was Saldanha who discovered the Konkani and Marathi MS of Krishnadas Shama and others in the Public Library of Braga, around 1950.

== Personal Collection ==
Saldanha donated his large personal collection to the Xavier Centre for Historical Research Library.

The Thomas Stephens Konknni Kendr, adjacent to the Xavier Centre of Historical Research at Alto Porvorim, Goa, possesses a manuscript copy of the Krista Purana by Thomas Stephens in Roman script, with the name "M.C. Saldanha" in pencil on one of the first pages, and also on the spine of the leather binding. Besides, the volume bears a stamp indicating that it was bound in Kodialbail, Mangalore. It is known that J.L. Saldanha, who produced the 1907 edition of the Khristapurana, had borrowed a manuscript copy of the Khristapurana from a Mr. Marian Saldanha, whom he describes as "an enthusiast of Purannic literature." However, more work will have to be done before the TSKK copy can be identified as having come from the collection of Mariano Saldanha. Unfortunately, the TSKK has not kept records of provenance.

== Bibliography ==
=== Primary ===
- Kalidasa, Meghaduta, tr. M. Saldanha. 1926.
- Stephens, Thomas. Doutrina Christam em Lingoa Bramana Canarim, ed. M. Saldanha. 1945.
- Saldanha, Mariano. As investigacoes de um Gramatico. 1933.
- Saldanha, Mariano. Iniciacao de lingua Concani. 1950.
- Saldanha, Mariano. “Aditamentos e correccoes a monografia ‘O livro e o jornal em Goa’ do professor Leão Fernandes.” Boletim Instituto Vasco da Gama 32 (1936) 60.
- Saldanha, Mariano. “História de Gramática Concani.” Bulletin of the School of Oriental Studies 8 (1935–37) 715-735.
- Da importancia do Sanscrito.
- Saldanha, Antonio. Upaxamu. (Part of Prasse pastoral). Ed. M. Saldanha.
- “O Purana Christão do Padre Thomaz Estevam.”
- “O Oriente Português.” Nova Goa, 1880.
- “Um Hino de Sant’Ana em Concani.” Heraldo, 1915.
- “O ensino do Concani.” Boletim do Instituto Vasco da Gama, Goa, 1926.
- “Questôes de Concani.” Heraldo, 1932.
- “Monsenhor Sebastião Rodolfo Dalgado.” Revista da Faculdade de Letras da Universidade de Lisboa, 1933.
- “Relacão historica das gramaticas Concanis.” Bulletin of the School of Oriental and African Sfudies, London, 1936.
- Thomas Stephens. Doutrina Christam em lingoa Bramana Canarim. Ordenada a maneira de Dialogo, pera ensinar os mininos. Coposta pollo Padre Thomas Estevao da Companhia de IESUS. natural de Lodres. Empressa no Collegio do Rachol da Copanhia de IESUS Anno 1622. 1945. [Reproduced by M. Saldanha in facsimile on pp. 55–190, with introduction, notes and appendices.]
- “Novos catecismos em Concani”. Heraldo, 1951.
- “A Transliteracão romanisada do Concani.” Heraldo, 1952.
- “A Lingua Concani e Acção Portuguesa na sua cultura.” Bulletin of Institute Menezes Braganca, 1953.
- “O Folclore Goês.” Heraldo, 1954.
- “A Literatura Puranica Cristã.” Boletim do Instituto Vasco da Gama, 1961.

=== Secondary ===
- Saradesaya, Manohararaya. A History of Konkani Literature: From 1500 to 1992. Sahitya Akademi, 2000.
- Vaz, J. Clement. Profiles of Eminent Goans, Past and Present. New Delhi: Concept Publishing, 1997.
