= Pratap Naik =

Indian Jesuit priest

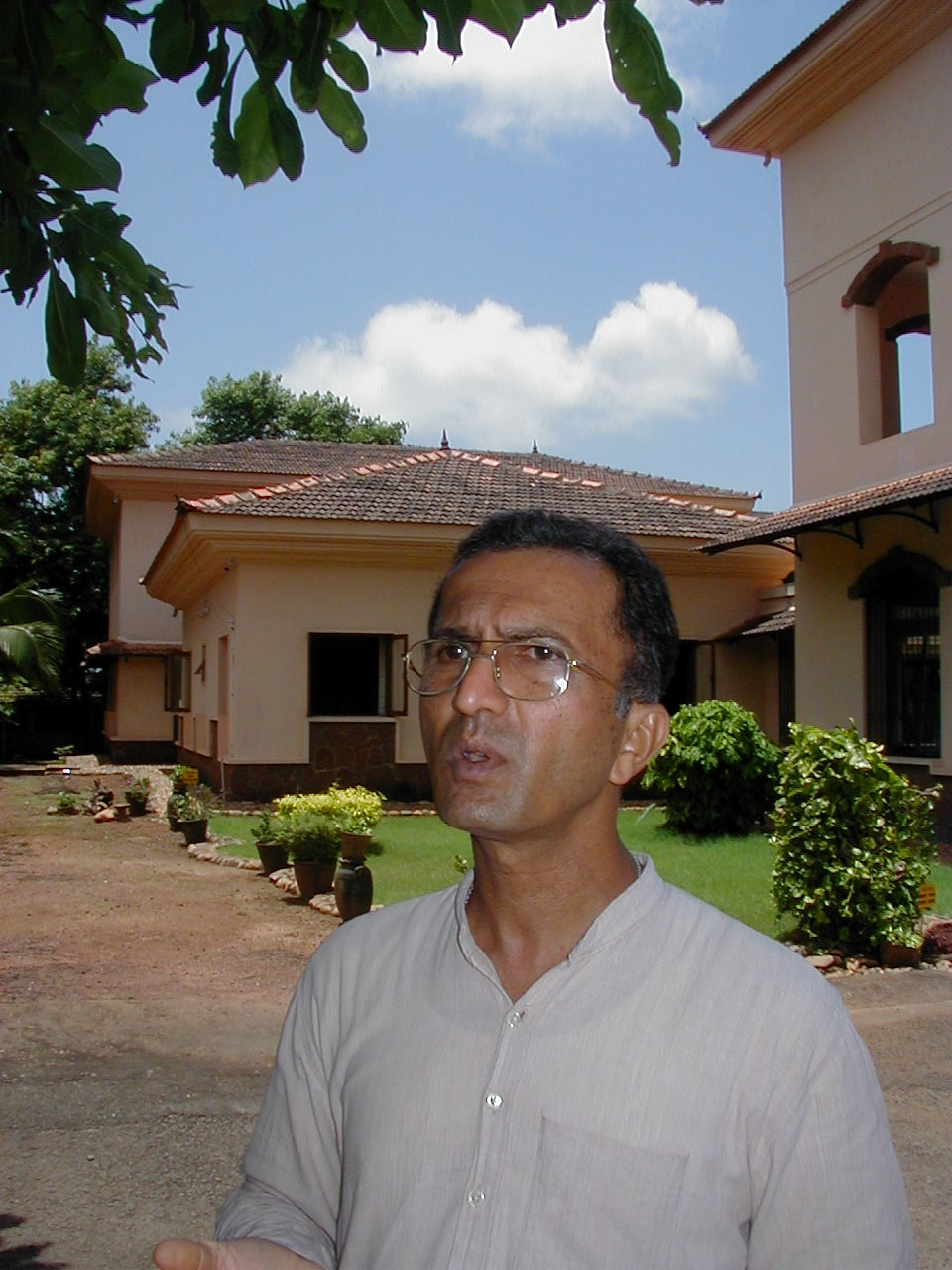
Naik at the Thomas Stephens Konkkni Kendr (TSKK) in 2006

Pratap Naik SJ (né Carvalho) is an Indian Jesuit priest from Kundapur, Karnataka, India. He was the director of the Thomas Stephens Konkkni Kendr (TSKK), a research institute working on issues related to the Konkani language, literature, culture and education. The institute is based in Alto Porvorim, on the outskirts of the state capital of Panaji (Panjim), Goa.

== Founding of the TSKK ==
Naik was one of the proponents for founding the TSKK. The proposal to do so was brought up before the provincial congregation (one of the official bodies of the Jesuits) in 1978. "We wanted to start a school, in the European sense. An institute of higher learning to teach Konkani to Jesuits (primarily and to others too)," according to Naik, who was then a young scholastic trained to take up this work.

TSKK is named after Thomas Stephens, the 16th century English Jesuit priest missionary who came to Goa in 1579 and lived in the region till his death. Stevens authored the Arte da lingoa Canarim, which was written in Portuguese, and was the first printed grammar of what is now called the Konkani language

In 1982 TSKK was registered as a society, and it commenced operation in January 1986 from its former premises at Loyola Hall in Miramar, Goa. Miramar itself is a centre for training young men wanting to become Jesuit priests.

== On the activities of the TSKK ==
The TSKK focuses on education and research of the Konkani language, literature and culture. Speaking about the professional activities of the TSKK, Pratap Naik has said, "We are not limiting ourselves only to Goa, but wherever Konkani is spoken. Shortly, we are going to study Siddi Konkani, spoken by a community of former slaves who were once located in Goa, and are now based in Yellapur in Konkani [sic]. For this we are collaborating with two Brazilian professors."

A large number of expatriates whose mother tongue was once Konkani are located outside of the Konkani-speaking regions of India. Regarding the creation of opportunities to educate members of such expatriate communities, Naik says: "It's a bit difficult. Distance education is more for information. Learning certain language skills has to be done through intensive contact programs. Short courses could be offered to attain language proficiency."

== Training for scholastics ==
Since 1986, Jesuit scholastics training to become priests were sent for a one-month training in Konkani. In 2003, a Konkani postgraduate diploma course was proposed.

== Roman script issue ==
In 2006, Naik was involved a campaign to get official recognition for the Roman script of Konkani, along with the Devanagari script, which is the sole officially recognized script for Konkani in Goa.
