= Paixao de Cristo =

Paixao de Cristo (Passion of Christ) are a set of poems in Portuguese, written in Goa during the 17th century in the Marathi language as Christi Vilapika using the Latin script, based on the crucifixion of Jesus Christ. Some of these poems were well-known to scholars like A. K. Priolkar and V.B. Prabhudessai, who called for critical study of them. Critical texts of three of these have recently been published in Goan Christian Marathi Vilapika during the 17th Century by Dr. S. M. Tadkodkar.

== Attribution to Thomas Stephens ==
The three poems published by Tadkodkar are found in the bound volume of Thomas Stephens’ Khristapurāṇa at the Central Library, Panjim (Discurso sobre a vinda de Jesu Christo Nosso Salvador ao Mundo dividido em dous tratados feito pelo Padre Thomas Estevão Ingrez da Companhia de Jesus. Impresso em Goa com licenca das Inquisicão, e Ordinario no Collegio de S. Paulo novo de Companhia de Jesu. Anno de 1654, Escripto por Manoel Salvador Rebello, Natural de Margão no Anno 1767). (This manuscript will henceforth be referred to as CL.) Tadkodkar attributes two of these, for reasons which will be listed below, to Thomas Stephens himself.

Of the three texts, the authorship of the second (PG-2) is clearly identified within the text itself: "Esta paixão foy composta pello Padre Manoel Jacques de Noronha natural de Sancoale morador em Azossim freguezia de Sam Matheus das Ilhas de Goa. Escripto por Manoel Salvador Rebello, morador em Margão da Provincia da Salcete no anno 1768". As for the other two (PG-1 and PG-3), Tadkodkar proposes—somewhat tentatively—that the author is Thomas Stephens himself. His reasons are as follows:

1. 4 stanzas of the Khristapurāṇa (II, 48-92, 95, 183, 184) have been bodily transferred to PG-3 (44, 45, 59). "There is no doubt that the poet ... was well conversant with the [sic] Stephens' classic writing. One cannot avoid the possibility that Stephens himself wrote the Vilāpikā, since that writing is included in the same bound [volume]. Joaquim Heliodoro da Cunha Rivara ... states about it in his epoch-making Ensaio ... (Nova Goa, 1858).”
2. A certain Alex Rhodes speaks of having seen "a very fine poem on the Passion of Our Lord which the Christians sang in the Church in the evenings of all Lent Fridays". However, he does not actually attribute this work to Etienne de la Croix.
3. J.H. da Cunha Rivara speaks of a Paixão composed by Stephens, with additions made by da Faria: "Passion of Christ Our Redeemer, composed by Father Thomas Stephens of the Society of Jesus, and additions made by Pascoal Gomes da Faria, priest of the Order and habit of the Prince of the Apostles Saint Peter, native of Batim, parish of our Lady of Guadalupe, of the Island of Goa of a few hymns at the end of the book. Year 1772".
4. PG-1 and PG-3 have no confirmed authorship. "However, the nature of sublimity one experiences in the texts of the Passion resembles the sublimity one experiences in the PURĀNNA. Besides, some of the strophes from the PURĀNNA are bodily present in the third text of the Paixão de Cristo". Croix, says Tadkodkar, would never have claimed authorship, given that Stephens had died just recently, in 1619.
5. Michel Foucault, drawing from St Jerome, proposes four criteria for determining authorship: a constant level of quality or value; conceptual or theoretical coherence; stylistic unity; and historical unity. Apart from pointing out a stylistic similarity (the Charanna-seuacu in PG-1 recalls the Christadāssu of the Khristapurāṇa II, 59, 123) Tadkodkar does not really pursue this fertile suggestion.
6. It would not have been possible for anyone to insert the verses from the Khristapurana into the main handwritten copy of the Paixao without a nod from the Inquisition. "I strongly feel that paixão do Christo was part and parcel of Christpurānna, and that Stephens might have written two of the three poems".

== Critical apparatus ==
The critically edited texts may be found in ch. 6 (Latin script) and 7 (Devanagari script) of Tadkodkar's book.

Besides these, there are the appendices. Any student of Thomas Stephens will rejoice to have available transcripts and translations of the Censures and Licences pertaining to the first three print editions of the Khristapurāṇa, as found in CL (Appendix A). Appendix B is a glossary of terms, beginning with Romanized Marathi, going on to Devanagari Marathi, and ending with English. Appendices C and D consist of explanatory notes, C of Christian terms, and D of terms sourced by the Christian writers from contemporary and prior Marathi writers. E is interesting: four texts of the Chilayābāl Vilāpikā, composed by Shridhar, a 17th-century poet from Nazhare-Pandharpur, not far from Goa, and published here for the first time, perhaps because of the "remote possibility" of some connection with the Passion poems. F contains select bibliography, and G is an index to the texts of the three Vilāpikās in Devanagari transliteration (misleadingly, however, entitled "Texts of the Christi Vilāpikā" in the Table of Contents).

== Contents ==
- Introduction.
- Prologue to the readers.
1. Christian Marathi literature in Goa.
2. Contribution of A.K. Priolkar and V.B. Prabhudessai to the study of Christian Marathi literature written during the 17th century.
3. Textual criticism and the Christian Marathi literature in Goa.
4. Depiction of suffering and the Cry.
5. Scheme of transliteration of Christian Marathi literature in Goa.
6. Texts of the Paixao de Cristo (Christi Vilapika) in the Latin script.
7. Texts of the Paixao de Cristo (Christi Vilapika) transliterated from the Latin script into the Devanagari script.
8. Structure of Marathi language in Christian literature in Goa.

Appendices

1. Censures and licenses.
2. Glossary (Marathi-Roman as well as Devanagari script-English).
3. Explanatory notes-I.
4. Explanatory notes-II.
5. Four texts of CHILAYABAL VILAPIKA.
6. Bibliography.
7. Texts of the Christi Vilapika.
