= Diogo Ribeiro (lexicographer) =

Portuguese lexicographer (1560–1633)

Diogo Ribeiro (1560 – 18 June 1633) was a Lisbon-born Jesuit missionary and Konkani lexicographer.

== Biography ==
Ribeiro was born in 1560 in Lisbon, Portugal. He was appointed to the Portuguese Rachol College in Rachol, located in the Salcete taluka of Goa. During his tenure there, he studied Sanskrit, Hindi, Marathi, and Konkani. He died on 18 June 1633 in Salcete, Goa.

== Literary works ==
Ribeiro edited and revised works authored by Thomas Stephens, the writer of the 1616 text Khristapurana. Ribeiro made numerous improvements to Stephens's Doutrina Christam (1622) and Arte da Lingoa Canarim (1640), releasing new editions of both publications.

In 1634, Ribeiro authored Declaracao da Doutrina Christam (1632) in Konkani. The work was modeled after Symbolum Fidei, a prominent text by the Jesuit Cardinal Bellarmine. To convey Christian theological concepts within the work, Ribeiro made extensive use of Sanskrit terminology, including terms such as Amrit, Vaikuntha, Agnipravesha, Avatar, Devasthan, and Dharma.

=== Lexicography ===
Ribeiro's most prominent work is his Konkani vocabulary compilation, which consists of two parts:

- Vocabulario da Lingoa Canarim feito pelo Padre Diogo Ribeiro (1626), a Portuguese–Konkani dictionary created by Father Diogo Ribeiro.
- Feito pelos Padres da Companhia de Jesus (1626), a Konkani–Portuguese vocabulary prepared by Jesuit fathers.

The dictionary contains 15,500 word entries. Alongside lexical definitions, Ribeiro recorded notable Konkani idioms and proverbs, including phrases such as Adechem aylem, adechem gelem; Chakri karunchi, bhakri khavunchi; Aaplem nashem, pelyachem hanshem; and Modem thoy rodem. The compilation provides historical perspective on the form of the Konkani language in the 17th century.
