= Roberto de Nobili =

Italian missionary

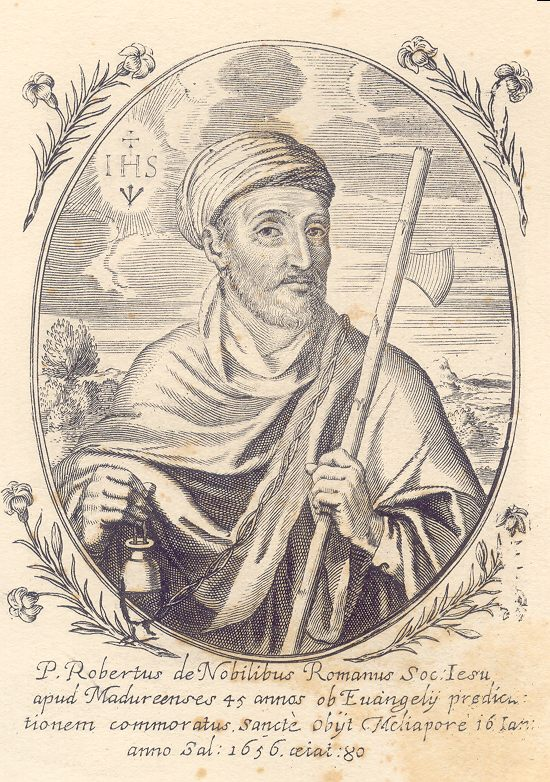
Roberto de Nobili

Roberto de Nobili, SJ (1577 – 16 January 1656) was an Italian Jesuit priest who worked as a missionary in Southern India. He used novel methods to preach Christianity, adopting many local customs of India that were, in his view, not contrary to Christian principles. He also won papal approval for a policy of accommodation that allowed converts to Christianity to continue to engage in Hindu practices deemed social practices rather than expressions of Hinduism.

== Biography ==
Born in Montepulciano, Tuscany, in September 1577, Roberto de Nobili arrived at the ports of the Portuguese in Goa and Bombay in western India on 20 May 1605. It is probable that he met here Fr Thomas Stephens, a Jesuit who had arrived in Goa in 1579, and was probably then in the process of composing his Khristapurana, an epic poem using Hindu literary forms to tell Christ's life story.

Roberto de Nobili, nicknamed the White Brahmin, embodied the missionary fervor of Christianity in Portuguese India and its relations with the court of the Mughal emperor Akbar. His approach to evangelization began by focusing of areas where Hinduism and Christianity agreed.

After a short stay in Cochin in Kerala, he took up residence in Madurai in Tamil Nadu in November 1606. He soon called himself a "teacher of wisdom" (தத்துவ போதகர்) and began to dress like a Sannyasi, someone who, following Hindu custom, practices a form of asceticism marked by disinterest in material life, wearing a white dhoti and wooden sandals. He adopted such local Indian customs as shaving one's head and keeping only a tiny tuft. He wore a three-stringed thread across the chest, which he chose to be a representation of the Holy Trinity. Claiming noble parentage, he approached high-caste people as an equal and eagerly engaged in dialogue with Hindu scholars about the truths of Christianity.

Nobili mastered Sanskrit, Telugu and Tamil languages and literature, with the help of his teacher, Shivadharma. Max Muller, a key figure in establishing the discipline of Orientalism, said of Robert de Nobili: "I can only speak of him here as the First European Sanskrit scholar." As Nobili explained Christian doctrine in Tamil, he appropriated several traditional Hindu words to communicate his message. He used the word "kovil" (கோவில்) for a place of worship, "arul" (அருள்) and "prasadam" (பிரசாதம்) for grace, "guru" (குரு) for priest or teacher, "Vedam" (வேதம்) for the Bible, "poosai" (பூசை) for Mass, and others. He composed Catechisms, explanatory works and philosophic discourses in Tamil and contributed to the development of modern Tamil prose writing.

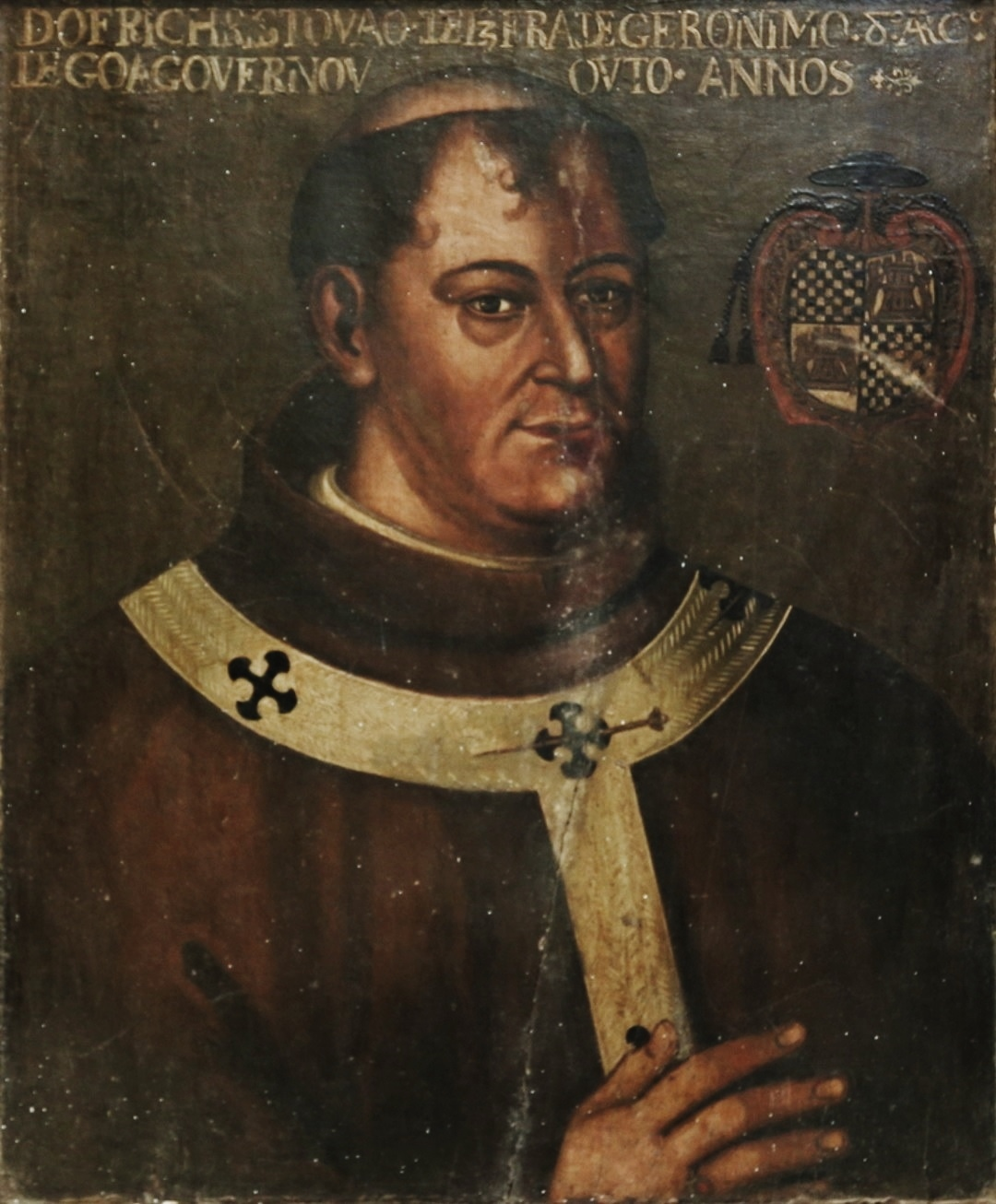
Archbishop Cristóvão de Sá e Lisboa, O.S.H.

The Portuguese missionaries who preceded him had found their converts among the lower classes, which had also earned them the scorn of the brahmins. Nobili's methods implicitly criticized the Portuguese approach and were therefore very controversial with his fellow Jesuits and the Archbishop of Goa Cristóvão de Sá e Lisboa. Their dispute was settled by Pope Gregory XV, who issued the apostolic constitution Romanæ Sedis Antistes on 31 January 1623. The customs of the three-stringed thread, the tuft, the use of sandalwood paste on the forehead, and baths were allowed, inasmuch as they did not imply any superstitious ritual. The Pope invited Indian neophytes (converts) to overcome their caste sensitivity and their contempt for pariahs.

Roberto de Nobili died in Mylapore near Chennai in Tamil Nadu on 16 January 1656 at the age of 79.

== The Ezourvedam ==
Some have identified Roberto de Nobili as the author of a spurious document that purported to be a French translation of an ancient Sanskrit scripture by the name of Ezourvedam. Max Mueller concluded that de Nobili was not its author. Ludo Rocher published a detailed study of the Ezourvedam which shows that the author of this text must have been a French missionary, and he proposed several names. Urs App has offered evidence for Jean Calmette (1692–1740) as the author.

== Bibliography ==
- S. Rajamanickam, S.J. (ed. and translator): Roberto de Nobili: on adaptation, Palayamkottai (India), 1971. Original treatise title: Adaptation - Narratio etc. 1619.
- S. Rajamanickam, S. J. (ed. and translator): Roberto de Nobili: on Indian customs, De Nobili Research Institute, Palayamkottai (India), 1972. Original treatise title: Indian customs - Informatio 1613.

== Legacy ==
- In the autumn of 2013, Loyola University Chicago opened a residence hall called de Nobili Hall at its Lake Shore campus. This five-story building houses approximately 200 first-year students, the international learning community, and features a 350-seat dining hall.
- In Ekaveera, a Telugu historical novel by Viswanatha Satyanarayana, the character of Tattvabodhaka swami appears to be based on Roberto de Nobili. He preaches Christianity wearing the Hindu sanyasi attire and ascetic style of living and engages in discourse and debate with the protagonist Ekaveera
- In Jharkhand, India, there are 8 Jesuit-run schools named De Nobili School after him. They are affiliated with the Council for Indian Certificate of Secondary Education (CISCE), New Delhi.

== See also ==
- Matteo Ricci
- Malabar rites
- Roman Catholic Brahmin
- John de Britto, a later Jesuit missionary who followed de Nobili's method and was martyred in south India
