= Étienne de la Croix =

French Jesuit (1579–1643)

Étienne de la Croix SJ
- Born: c. 1579; Évreux
- Died: 1643 (aged 63–64)

Étienne de la Croix SJ (Diocese of Évreux, 1579–1643), was a French Jesuit, missionary to India and author of a life of St Peter in Marathi: Discurso sobre a vida do Apostolo Sam Pedro em que se refuta os principaes erros do gentilismo (Goa, 1629).

== Biography ==
De la Croix entered the Society of Jesus in 1599, and arrived in India in 1602. He succeeded the English Jesuit Thomas Stephens as Rector of the College at Rachol. He seems to have made a study of the Hindu Puranas and religious beliefs. A list of references given in his works shows that he used at least 26 Hindu puranas in the composition of his own purana.

His Peter Purana, as it is popularly known, consisted of 12,000 ovis (verses) in a Marathi that contained a significant number of Konkani words and expressions. He also wrote in Konkani language, though none of these works survive, according to Alexandre Rhodes, writing in 1621. In contrast to Thomas Stephens' Krista Purana, the Peter Purana is far more polemical.
