= Sebastião Rodolfo Dalgado =

Portuguese Catholic priest (1855–1922)

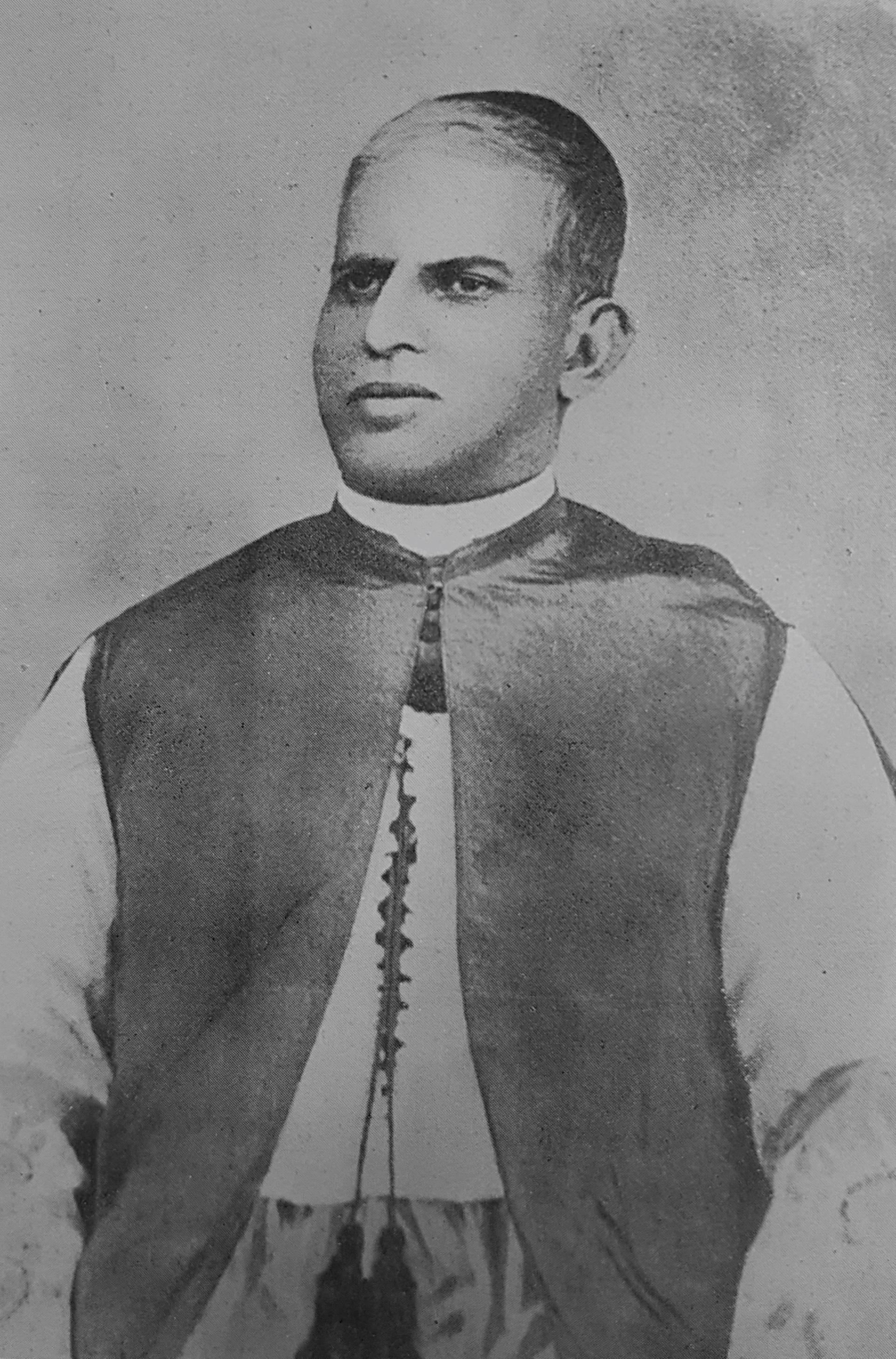
- Born: 8 May 1855; Assagão, Goa, Portuguese India
- Died: 4 April 1922 (aged 66)
- Occupations: Catholic priest; academic; professor; theologian; orientalist; linguist

Monsignor Sebastião Rodolfo Dalgado (Romi Konkani: Sebastav Rodolf Dalgad; 8 May 1855 – 4 April 1922) was a Goan Catholic priest, academic, university professor, theologian, orientalist, and linguist. He distinguished himself as a linguist and etymologist in the study of the influences of língua Portuguesa on a number of languages of South-east Asia. He was a corresponding member of the Academia das Ciências de Lisboa, elected on 27 July 1911. He also became widely renowned during his lifetime as a Konkani language scholar.

== Early life ==
Sebastião Rodolfo Dalgado was born on 8 May 1855 in the village of Assagaõ, Bardes concelho, Portuguese Goa, to a family of Goan Catholics belonging to the Bamonn (Brahmin) caste. The family's pre-conversion surname was Desai, which was replaced by the Portuguese surname Dalgado, after their conversion to Roman Catholicism.

The second son of Ambrose Dalgado, a landowner in Bardes, and Florinda Rosa de Souza, he had six brothers and one sister. Among the siblings were Daniel Gelásio Dalgado, a medical director of the health services from Savantvaddi and an eminent botanist; Patrocínio Dalgado, an ophthalmologist; and Eduardo Dalgado, a lawyer in Lisboa.

After completing his elementary studies in Assagaõ, Dalgado completed his secondary education in Mapuça and joined the Rachol Seminary, near Margaõ, from where he was ordained a priest in 1881.

Considered the best student of his course, he was selected for further studies and then went on to Rome, where he enrolled at the Seminary of St. Apollinaris. In Rome his doctorate was in Canon Law and Roman Law.

== Return from Lisbon ==
After a brief stay in Lisbon in 1884, Dalgado returned to Goa as a missionary, where the then Patriarch of the East Indies, Don António Sebastião Valente, appointed him as the inspector of schools and workshops of the Padroado do Oriente and as a professor of Scripture and Canon Law at the Seminary of Rachol, where he formerly studied. He also functioned as an ecclesiastical judge in Goa.

Subsequently, he was intensely involved in religious activity in India, and then became vicar general of the island of Ceylon, particularly of the Portuguese mission in the city of Colombo, which had been abolished by Concordat of 1886.

Later, he served at Calcutta, where he founded a school for girls and a dispensary for the poor in Nagori, and Dhaka.

== Close contacts with languages ==
All this missionary activity enabled him to forge close contacts with various language communities, thus allowing him to acquire a mastery of several Indian languages, including Mahratti, Kanarese, Bangla, Tamizh, and Sinhalese. Learning some of these languages was made easier due to his deep knowledge of Sanskrit.

Between 1893 and 1895 he was vicar-general in the coastal village of Honnavara, Kanara. There he served a parish community of Konkani and Kanarese language speakers, the latter being a language new to him that he learned during his pastoral service. While in the Portuguese outpost of Savantvaddi, with his brother Gelasius Dalgado, who was a doctor there, he learned the other dialects of the Konkani language.

When he was vicar general of Ceylon, he declined to accept the bishop's mitre that the Congregation of Propaganda Fide had offered him, probably in the context of the dispute between Portugal and the Holy See on the extent and powers of the Patronage of the East (Padroado).

During his stay in Ceylon, he wrote several sermons and homilies in the Indo-Portuguese dialect of Ceylon. His other work included The Indo-Portuguese Dialect of Ceylon, published in 1900 in Contributions of the Geographical Society of Lisbon, done in commemoration of the centenary of the European discovery of sea route to India.

== Dictionaries ==
His first published work was the first part of Konkani–Portuguese Dictionary, written using the Devanagari script and the Roman script, and which was published in 1893 in the city of Bombay, now known as Mumbai.

In 1895 he settled in Lisbon, where he completed the publication of the Portuguese–Konkani Dictionary (which was out in 1905) and devoted himself to study the influence of English on the languages of the Indian subcontinent.

In view of its studies published, in 1907 he was appointed Professor of Sanskrit in the Curso Superior de Letras, which was founded in 1859 by D. Pedro V in Lisbon. This institution later on went on to become the nucleus of the Faculty of Arts of the University of Lisbon.

== Recognition ==
In 1911, Dalgado was elected corresponding member of the Academy of Sciences, and received the title of Doutor em Letras, which was granted by the Council of the Faculty of Arts of Lisbon (Conselho da Faculdade de Letras de Lisboa).

He suffered from diabetes, which ultimately resulted in the amputation of both his legs (in 1911 and 1915.) From that point onwards, Dalgado used a wheelchair.

Because of his handicap, the Faculty of Humanities granted him the privilege of performing his duties from his home, where his students gathered around him to hear his lessons. He also undertook the daily celebration of Mass in his wheelchair, with special religious permission.

When he died, on 4 April 1922, his funeral rites reflected the wide prestige that had won. In attendance were the Patriarch of Lisbon, the Apostolic Nuncio in Lisbon, the Minister of Education and representatives of colleges and academies of Lisbon.

The funeral eulogy was delivered by Canon José de Santa Rita e Sousa, professor of the Escola Superior Colonial, where he taught the chair of Konkani language. The press coverage was large, reflecting throughout the Lusophone world.

He was an eminent philologist, publishing, among other works, the Glossário Luso-Asiático in two volumes, full-text versions of which are available online today. He was also the author of outstanding works in the field of Portuguese Orientalism such as The Indo-Portuguese dialect of Ceylon; Konkani-Portuguese Dictionary; The Indo-Portuguese dialect of Mumbai and suburbs; Influencia do vocabulário português em línguas asiáticas (The Influence of Portuguese Vocables in Asian Languages); The Indo-Portuguese Dialects of Goa, Daman and Ceylon; Fundamentals of the Sanskrit language, and Indian Proverbs.

His works have earned high praise, including that of Dr. Gonçalves Viana who appreciated his work The Influence of Portuguese Vocables in Asian Languages and said that perhaps no other wise person, Portuguese or foreign, could carry it out satisfactorily.

The Brazilian philologist Dr. Solidonio Leite said that "Monsignor Dalgado could undertake and carry out those works that attest to exceptional value of this great man".

In recognition of his work in 1904, he received the honour of honorary chaplain of the Pope's extra urbem, with the right to use the title of "Monsignor". He was a member of the Lisbon Geographic Society (1895), a member of the Institute of Coimbra (1896), Doctor Honoris Causa from the Faculty of Arts, University of Lisbon (1911), corresponding member Academy of Sciences (1911) and its member (1922) and a member of the Royal Asiatic Society in London (1921).

In 1922, the Academy of Sciences of Lisbon, which bequeathed the 300 documents that constitute the Monsignor Dalgado Fund, admitted him posthumously as a member. Along with Shenoi Goembab and Joaquim Heliodoró da Cunha Rivara, Sebastião Rodolfo Dalgado is widely considered to be a pioneer in the defence of the Konkani language.

The city of Lisbon honoured him with a place named after him, to a wide locality in the parish of São Domingos de Benfica. In 1955 the Correios do Estado da Índia (postal department of the Estado da Índia) issued a postage stamp of a one real denomination, to mark the centenary of the birth of Monsignor Sebastiao Rodolfo Delgado, accompanied by a postcard with his photograph.

In 1988, the Goan state capital of Panjim saw the creation of the Dalgado Konknni Akademi, an academy to promote the use of the Konkani language in the Latin alphabet (the Konkani Romi lipi). The Dalgado Konknni Akademi has also established the Monsignor Sebastiao Rudolfo Dalgado Award to be awarded annually for activities to promote the study and use of Konkani. Dalgado Sahityik Puroskar (Dalgado Literary Award). Dalgado Romi Konknni Seva Puroskar (Dalgado Roman Konkani Service Award) Dalgado Sonskrutik Puroskar (Dalgado Cultural Award). Dalgado Tornatto Puroskar (Dalgado Youth Award)

== Bibliography ==
- Berço de uma cantiga em indo-português : a memoria de Ismael Gracias. [S.I. : s.n.], 1921 (Porto : Tip. Sequeira). Separata da "Revista Lusitana", vol. XXII.
- Contribuições para a lexiocologia luso-oriental. Lisboa: Academia das Sciências, 1916. Encad., 192 p.
- Hitopadexa ou Instrucsao Util (translation of Hitopadesa from the Sanskrit original into Portuguese). Lisbon, 1897, xxii, 292 pp.
- Dialecto Indo-Portugues de Ceyldo. Lisbon, 1900, xii, 262 pp.
- Dialecto Indo-Portugues de Gôa. Oporto, 1900, 22 pp.
- Dialecto indo-português de Goa; dialecto indo-português do norte. Porto: Lisboa : Typographia de A. F. Vasconcellos.
- Dialecto Indo-Portugues de Damao. Lisbon, 1903, 31 pp.
- Diccionario Portugues-Concani. Lisbon, 1905, xxxii, 906pp.
- Estudos sobre os crioulos indo-portugueses. introd. de Maria Isabel Tomás. Lisboa : CNCDP, 1998. – 187 p.
- Dialecto Indo-Portugues do Norte (the Indo-Portuguese dialect of Bombay and its suburbs). Lisbon, 1906, 62pp.
- Influencia do Vocdbulario Portugues em Linguas Asiaticas. (Influence of Portuguese vocables in Asiatic languages) Coimbra, 1913, xcii + 253 pp.
- Contribuifao para a Lexicologia Luso-Oriental (Contributions towards a study of Luso-Oriental words). Coimbra, 1916, 196 pp.
- Historia de Nala e Damyanti (Translation of Nala and Damayanti from the Sanskrit original into Portuguese). Coimbra, 155 pp.
- Dialecto Indo-Portugues de Negapatam. Oporto, 1917, 16pp.
- Gonsalves Viana e a Lexicologia Portuguesa de origem Asiatico-Ajricana.
- Olossario Luso-Asiatico, Vol. I. Coimbra, 1919, lxvii, 535 pp.
- Glossario Luso-Asiatico, Vol. II. Lisbon, 1921, vii, 580 pp.
- Rudimentos da lingua Sanscrita (Rudiments of Sanskrit, for use of students at the University). 1920.
- Florilegio de Proverbios Concanis. Coimbra, 1922, xx, 330 pp.
- Primeiro plano geral da celebração nacional do quarto centenário da partida de Vasco da Gama para o descobrimento da Índia. Lisboa : Imprensa Nacional, 1897. 8 p. Obra traduzida em Konkani (língua vernácula da Índia portuguesa).
