= Arte da Lingoa Canarim =

16th-century Konkani language grammar

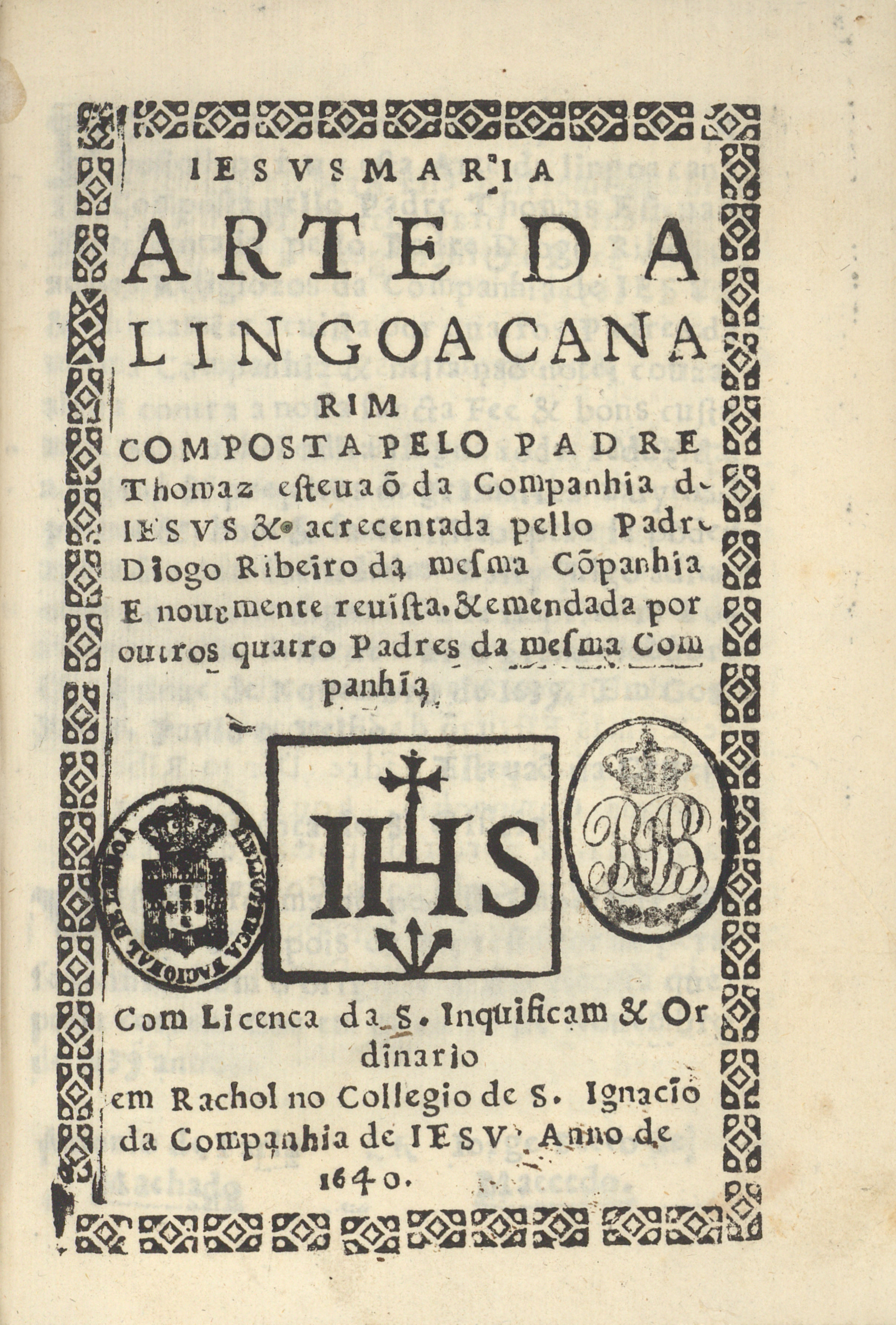
- Arte da Lingoa Canarim (1640) by Fr. Thomas Stephens SJ, details the grammar and structure of the Konkani language, here called the 'Canarese language'.
- Author: Fr. Thomas Stephens SJ (1549-1619)
- Original title: Jesus Maria Arte da Lingoa Canarim
- Language: Portuguese
- Subject: Konkani language grammar
- Publisher: College of Rachol
- Publication date: 1640
- Publication place: Goa, Portuguese India
- Preceded by: Doutrina Christam (1622)
- Website: https://purl.pt/31524 (Biblioteca Nacional)

Arte da Lingoa Canarim (transl. Art of the Canarese Language) is a grammar of the Konkani language, written by the 16th-century English Jesuit priest Thomas Stephens and published in 1640 in Portuguese, thus making Konkani the first among the modern Indian languages to have its grammar codified and described.

The system was expanded upon by Diogo Ribeiro and four other Jesuits and printed in Rachol (today located in the Indian state of Goa), Portuguese India, in the year 1640. A second edition was then developed and introduced in 1857 by J.H. da Cunha Rivara, who possessed a great passion for Konkani. Consequently, three versions of the Arte exist:

1. Arte da lingoa Canari. MS held by the School of Oriental and African Studies, London.
2. Arte da lingoa Canarim, composed by Padre Thomaz Estevão and Padre Diogo Ribeiro of the Company of Jesus & amended by other Padres of the same company. 1640.
3. Grammatica da Lingua Concani, composed by Padre Thomaz Estevão of the Company of Jesus and edited by J.H. da Cunha Rivara. Nova Goa: Imprensa Nacional. 1857.

== Canarim ==
Konkani has been known by a variety of names: Canarim, Concanim, Gomantaki, Bramana and Goani. It is called Amchi Bhas ("our language") by native speakers and Govi, or Goenchi Bhas, by others. Pro-Maharashtra agitators tend to call it gomantaki or goanese, because they claim Konkani spoken outside Goa is a recent dialect of the "classical language" Marathi.

The name canarim or língua canarim (transl. Canarese language), which is how Thomas Stephens himself refers to it in the title of his famous grammar, has always been intriguing. It is possible that the term is derived from the Persian word for coast, kinara; if so, it would be means "the language of the coast." The problem is that this term overlaps with Canarese or Kannada (called Canarese by British colonial administrators). It is therefore not surprising to find Mariano Saldanha calling absurd the appellation língua canarim, since the language of Goa, being derived from Sanskrit, has little to do with Kannada, which is a Dravidian language. The missionaries, who certainly travelled to Kanara as well, must have realized the infelicity of the term, but, not being philologists, continued to follow the current practice. Thus Stephens speaks of the língua canarim, and a Portuguese missionary called his work Arte Canarina da lingoa do Norte, referring to the Konkanised Marathi of the northern province of Damaon, Bassein, Bandra (Salsette Island) & Bombay.

All the authors, however, recognized two forms of the language in Goa: The plebeian form called canarim, and the more regular, used by the educated classes, called lingua canarim brámana (transl. Brahmin Canarese language) or simply brámana de Goa. Since the latter was the preferred choice of the Europeans (and also of other castes) for writing, sermons and religious purposes, it was this that became the norm for all the grammars, including that of Stephens'. The licence of the Ordinary given to his work refers to it as "arte da lingua canarin bramana". For his Krista Purāṇa, Stephens preferred to use Marathi, and gives explicit notice of his choice, even though he also notes that he mixes this with the local "language of the Brahmins" so as to make his work more accessible. He was therefore well aware of the difference between Marathi and what he chose to call canarim.

== See also ==
- Doutrina Christam em Lingoa Bramana Canarim – Christian Doctrines in Konkani
- Krista Purana – 1616 epic poem by Thomas Stephens
- Arte da Lingoa de Iapam – 17th century Portuguese grammar of Japanese
- Art of Grammar of the Most Used Language on the Coast of Brazil – 1595 book by Joseph of Anchieta
- Arte de la lengua mexicana con la declaración de los adverbios della – Nahuatl grammar book
- Arte de la lengua mexicana y castellana – 1571 grammar of Nahuatl by Alonso de Molina
- Printing in Goa
- Saint Paul's College, Goa – Defunct Jesuit school in Portuguese Goa
