= Doutrina Christam em Lingoa Bramana Canarim =

Doutrina Christam
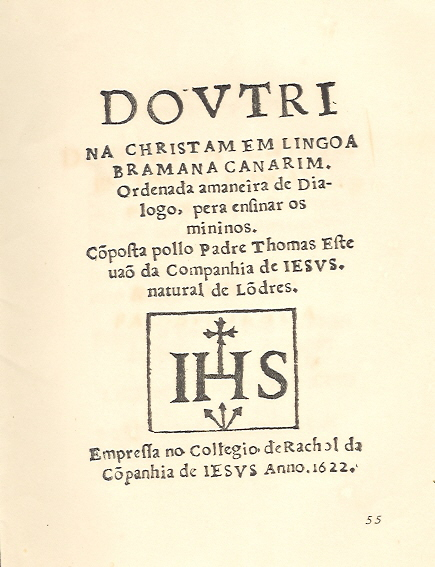
- The Doutrina Christam (1622)
- Author: Fr. Thomas Stephans (1549-1619)
- Language: Konkani
- Subject: Christianity
- Publisher: College of Rachol, Goa
- Publication date: 1622
- Publication place: India
- Media type: manuscript
- Preceded by: Krista Purana (1616)
- Followed by: Arte da Lingoa Canarim (1640)

Doutrina Christam em Lingoa Bramana Canarim (Christian Doctrines in the Canarese Brahmin Language), commonly known as Doutrina Christam or Dovtrina Christam, was written by Fr. Thomas Stephens (1549–1619), an English Jesuit, and published in 1622. The larger form of the book's name is Doutrina Christam em Lingua Bramana Canarim, Ordenada a maniera de dialogo para ensinar os meninos, pelo Padre Thomas Estevão, Jesuita, no Collegio de Rachol (Christian Doctrines in the Canarese Brahmin Language, arranged in dialogue to teach children, by Fr. Thomas Stephans, College of Rachol, 1622).

== Citations ==
- Lal, Mohan (1992), Sahitya Akademi Inde; Lal, Mohan (eds.), Encyclopedia of Indian Literature, Sahitya Akademi, ISBN 81-260-1221-8.
