= Joaquim Heliodoro da Cunha Rivara =

Portuguese historian and philologist (1809–1879)

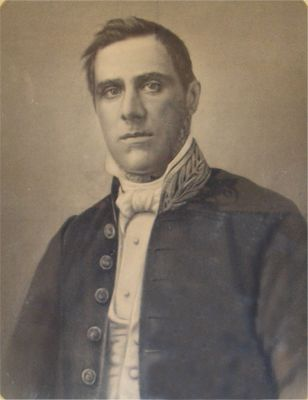
- Rivara in c. 1855
- Born: 23 June 1809; Arraiolos, Kingdom of Portugal
- Died: 20 February 1879 (aged 69); Évora, Kingdom of Portugal
- Occupations: Physician; professor; intellectual; politician

Joaquim Heliodoro da Cunha Rivara (23 June 1809 – 20 February 1879) was a Portuguese medical doctor, professor, intellectual and politician. He excelled as a scholar of the history of the Portuguese presence in India and as a champion of the Konkani language.

== Early life ==
Joaquim Heliodoro da Cunha Rivara was born in Arraiolos, eldest son of António Francisco Rivara and Maria Isabel da Cunha Feio Castelo Branco. His father was a doctor of Genoese origin, and was a student at Casa Pia de Lisboa, while his mother was of Portuguese origin.

After preparatory studies in Évora, where he studied languages and humanities, and courses in Mathematics and Philosophy at the University of Coimbra, where he enrolled in the year 1824, he moved in 1827 to the course of medicine at the same university, graduating in the year 1836. Suspension of classes as a result of the Portuguese Civil War (1828–1834) delayed his graduation.

== Career ==
Rivara was not attracted to clinical practice and therefore chose an administrative career in the Civil Government of Évora, which he joined in 1837 as administrative officer of its secretariat. In October of that year was appointed Professor of Rational and Moral Philosophy of the Liceu de Évora, where he could indulge his taste for the humanities and his love for books.

In 1838, Rivara was appointed by the government of Queen Maria II of Portugal as Director of the Public Library of Évora, the first director of the institution appointed by the state and the first layman to occupy the position. Over the more than 15 years of his service (1838–1855), he distinguished himself as a librarian and bibliophile, reorganised the library and published its catalogue. He built a new wing with a capacity of 8,000 books, carried out a complete repair of the building, brought in more than 10,000 volumes from defunct convents, besides donating also several books from his own private library. Because of the shortage of employees, he catalogued all these volumes himself.

In this capacity he discovered the Manifesto sumário para os que ignoram poder-se navegar pelo elemento do ar of Bartolomeu Lourenço de Gusmão, published in 1849 by Canon Francisco Freire de Carvalho.

At the same time devoted himself to journalism, and published in various periodicals, especially the Panorama and the Revista Universal. He also devoted himself to the translation of articles from the Revue des Deux Mondes and corresponded with some of the most prominent Portuguese intellectuals of his time.

Having gained a reputation as an intellectual and author of numerous publications, despite withdrawing from active politics, in the general elections of December 1852 he was elected from Evora for the 9th legislative assembly (1853–1856), and took his oath on 31 January 1853. In the Parliament he was a member of the commissions for administration, agriculture and public health, and later also that of the Treasury. His parliamentary activity focused primarily on representing the interests of his constituency.

== Move to Portuguese Goa ==
Rivara had to resign from the legislature upon his appointment as Secretary General of the Governor General of Goa, the colony in India that the Portuguese called the Estado da Índia, the Governor General being António César de Vasconcelos Correia, later the first Count of Torres Novas. He remained in office during the mandates of Vasconcelos Correia and his successor José Ferreira Pestana, until his resignation in 1870 .

In the exercise of that office he spent 22 years in Goa. He succeeded in winning the confidence of the politicians of the time thanks to his excellent work in the improvement of administrative services, public education and popular education, being appointed eventually also to the post of Commissioner of Studies in India. He also took interest in the economic and industrial progress of the State and the living conditions of its people, especially the issues of language, and is considered a pioneer in the study of the Konkani language, which till his time had been regarded as a mere dialect.

Among the tasks entrusted to him was also the establishment of the circumscription of the Catholic bishops of India under the jurisdiction of the Padroado do Oriente, which had been redefined by the Concordat of 1857, because in addition to the functions of Secretary General, in 1862 he was appointed by Minister Mendes Leal as Royal Commissioner in the East. This led him to undertake several trips around the Indian subcontinent and other parts of the East, as a result of which he produced an extensive research work describing a large number of ruins and monuments relating to the Portuguese presence in that part of the world.

During his stay in Goa he published several articles and books on the history of Goa, reorganised the archives of the Governor General, and tried to instill in a large group of Goan intellectuals a taste for historical research. He also devoted himself to journalism, publishing articles in defence of what he understood to be the rights of Portugal in the East against the hegemony of the British Raj . He created and edited the journal O Chronista de Tissuary. He kept up an extensive collaboration with Goan and Portuguese newspapers, particularly with the Official Gazette, the O Chronista de Tissuary and other periodicals, and also continued the investigations of historians John de Barros and Diogo do Couto .

With his interest in philology, he edited Thomas Stephens' Arte da lingoa Canarim, which he published under the title Grammatica da Lingua Concani in 1857, together with the Ensaio Histórico da Língua Concani. Unlike those of his countrymen who were only interested in establishing the Portuguese language, ignoring or discounting the native cultures, Cunha Rivara believed that the Portuguese language could be better diffused in Goa by using the local languages, Konkani and Marathi in particular, as mediums of public instruction. Soon after his arrival in Goa, he asserted this belief in an inaugural conference of the Escola Normal of Nova Goa (Panjim), on 1 October 1856. The text of this speech may be found in the Boletim do Governo, n.º 78.

As a contribution to the history of Portuguese thought, he published the Letters of Luís António Verney and António Pereira de Figueiredo to the priests of the Oratorian Congregation in Goa. His most valuable work, however, was the development of the Arquivo Português-Oriental (1857–1876), where he transcribed in chronological order the documents found in the East about the Portuguese rule.

After resigning as Secretary General, he continued to live in Goa until 1877, when he returned to Évora and devoted himself to publishing articles about history, especially regarding the Portuguese presence in India. He also studied the history of the Alentejo: the Memórias da Villa de Arrayolos were published posthumously in three volumes, under the editorship of Francisco Martins Ramos, between 1979 and 1991. Cunha Rivara also published several texts on public health.

He was a corresponding fellow of the Academia das Ciências de Lisboa (1855), the Instituto Histórico e Geográfico do Brasil e the Real Sociedade Asiática. He was one of the founders of the Instituto Vasco da Gama. He was decorated with the Order of the Immaculate Conception of Vila Viçosa and the Order of Saint James of the Sword. He was awarded the Medalha Real de Mérito Científico, Literário e Artístico. He was a member of His Majesty's Council.

== Legacy ==
A prominent road in the city of Panaji in Goa, India is named as Rua Cunha Rivara. The 'Joaquim Heliodoro da Cunha Rivara Chair' in Portuguese Studies and Indo-Portuguese Comparative Studies has been established at the Goa University in his honour.
