= Thomas Stephens Konknni Kendr =

Jesuit research institute based in Goa, India

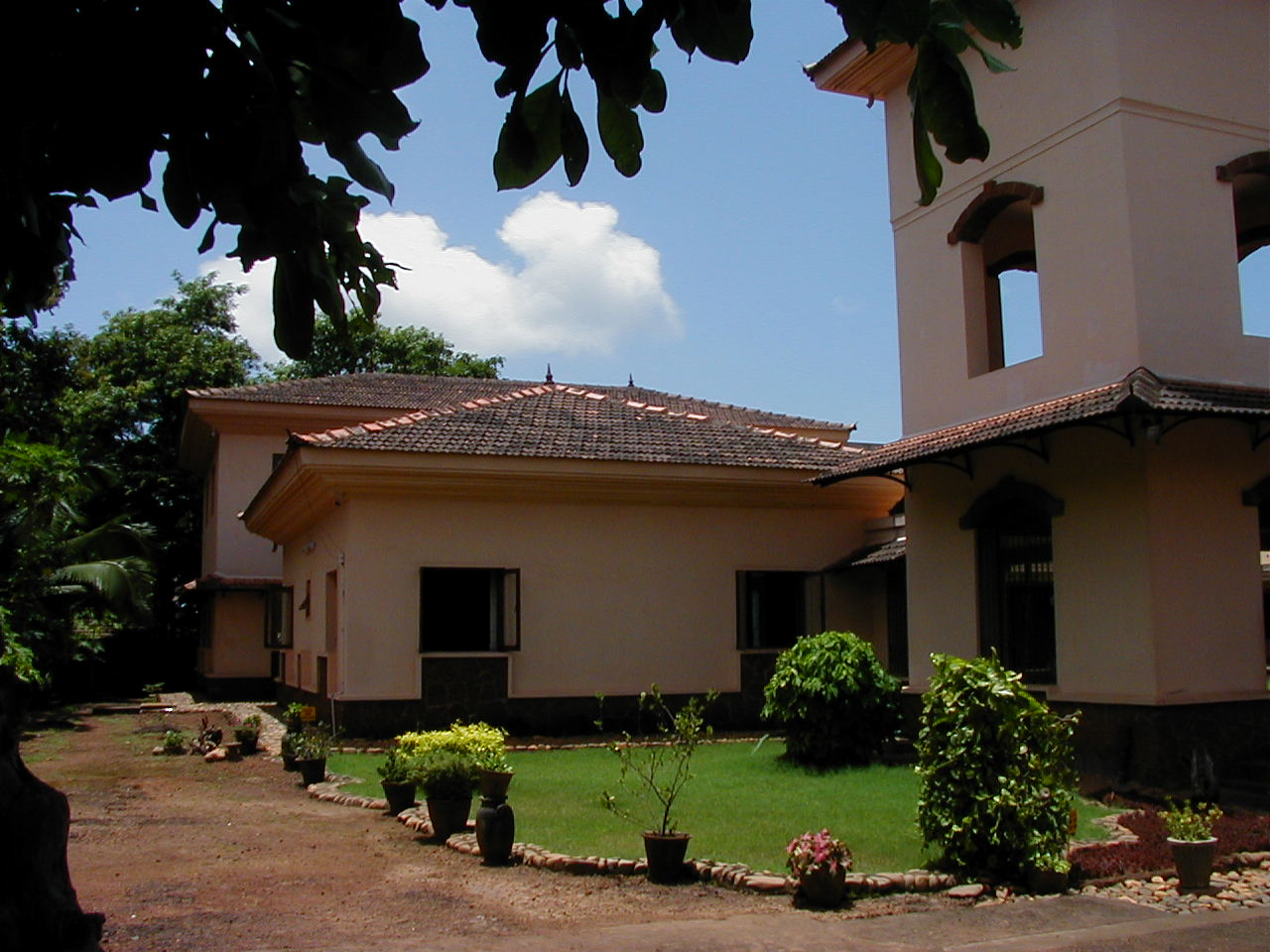
- TSKK campus at Alto Porvorim
- Abbreviation: TSKK
- Formation: 1982
- Type: NGO
- Purpose: Promoting the Konkani language.
- Headquarters: Alto Porvorim, Bardez, Goa.
- Location: Alto Porvorim, Bardez, Goa.
- Region served: Goa and rest of the Konkani speaking areas in coastal western India.
- Director: Pratap Naik
- Website: http://tskk.org

Thomas Stephens Konknni Kendr (TSKK) is a Jesuit research-institute working on issues related to the Konkani language, literature, culture and education. It is based in Alto Porvorim, on the outskirts of the state capital of Goa, India.

== Aim ==
The TSKK says it "is devoted to the promotion of education and research in the Konknni language, literature and culture". It was registered under the Societies Registration Act in 1982 and first functioned from 1986 at the locality of Miramar, before its current premises was built. It is located alongside the also Jesuit Xavier Centre of Historical Research.

== Current status, and name ==
TSKK is a Society registered under the Indian Societies Registration Act of 1860. From June 1999, it has been recognized by the Goa University as a Konknni research institute.

This institution gets its name from the sixteenth-century English Jesuit priest, Thomas Stephens (1549–1619), a linguist and Marathi poet. Stephens came to Goa, then a Portuguese colony, on 24 October 1579. According to the institution, Stephens learned the Konknni and Marathi languages and wrote in them. He produced the first grammar to be produced in an Indian language, in Konknni printed in 1622. Stephens died in Goa in 1619.

== Research bulletin ==
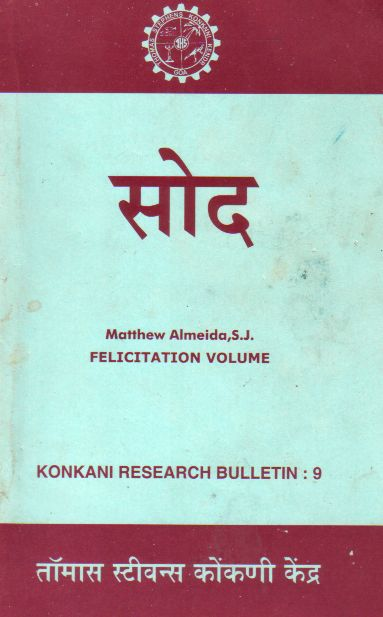
TSKK's Sod research bulletin

One of the activities of the TSKK is the publication of a research bulletin called Sod. This journal is edited, produced and published as part of TSKK's "research efforts ... devoted to the promotion of education and research in (the) Konknni language, literature and culture". Its articles are a mix of Konknni written in Devanagari-script, the Roman (Romi) script, and occasionally in English too.

Generally Sod issues are priced at Rs 50 each (in Goa).

== Courses in Konkani, etc ==
TSKK also offers courses in the Konknni language, and on project methodology for researchers, and study methodology for students. Currently (September 2006), the TSKK is working on language-teaching books for adults and children to learn Konkani (in the Romi or Roman script).

== Management and location ==
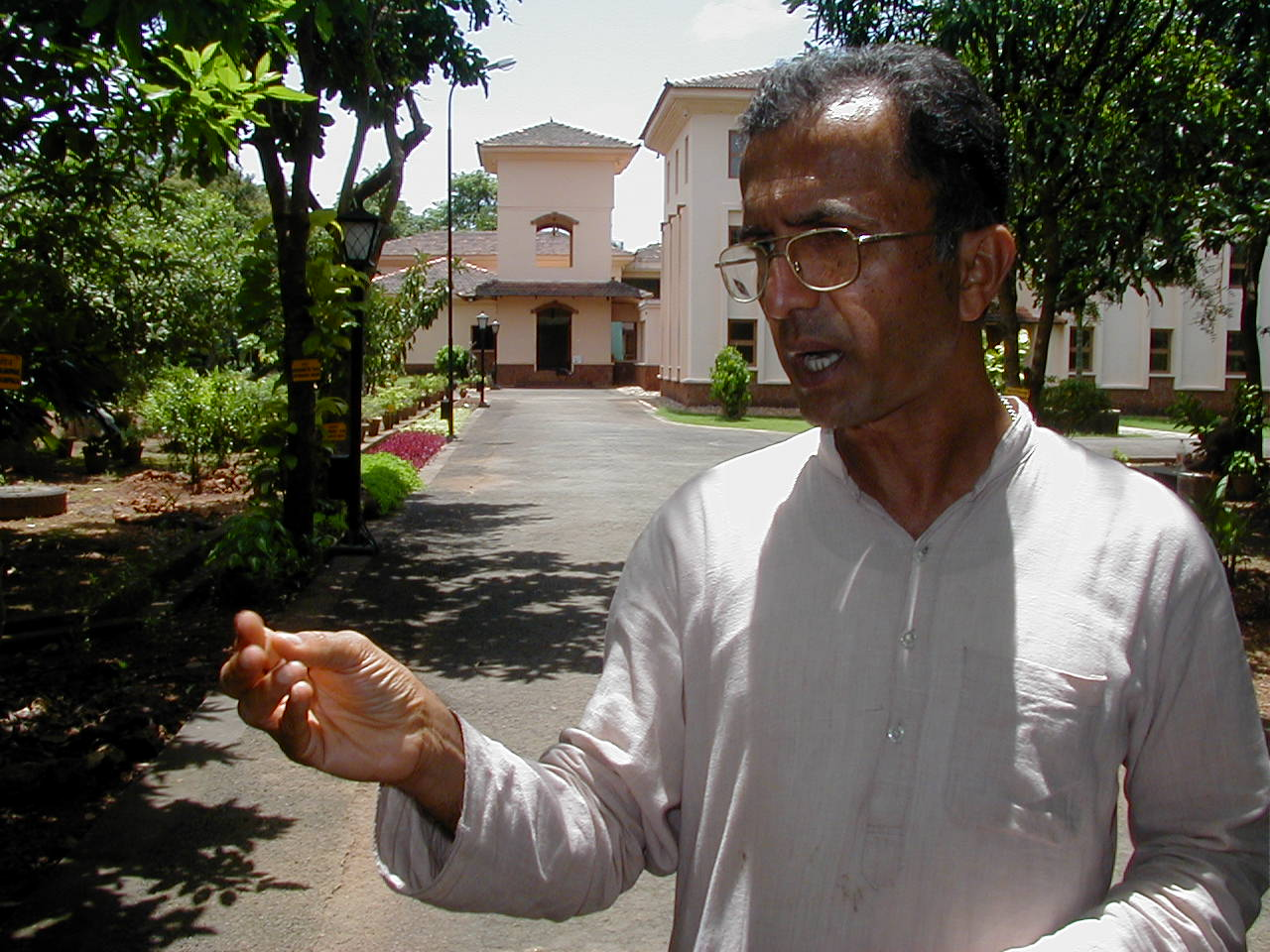
Pratap Naik, sj, director of TSKK

Earlier, this institute was headed by Fr Mathew Almeida, sj who has been succeeded by Fr Pratap Naik sj.

Thomas Stephens Konknni Kendr is located at B.B.Borkar Road, Alto Porvorim, Goa (India) 403 521.

== Publications ==
TSKK has come out with a number of publications in the Konknni language, or in languages like English introducing themes related to Konknni, which is India's smallest language, spoken mainly along the west coast of this country.

Some of its publication include a 1988 guide to writing Devanagari script Konknni (20 pp, then priced at Rs 3, now out of print), A Description of Konknni by Matthew Almeida, sj (1989), Teacher's and Parent's Manual (1996, pp 150) by Pratap Naik, S.J., TSKK Konknni Basic Course (Matthew Almeida, SJ, 1991), Tisvaddeacheo Igorzo (Moreno de Souza, SJ, 1994, on the churches of the sub-district of Tiswadi in Goa), TSKK Romi Lipi (TSKK's orthography for Roman-script Konknni by Pratap Naik, SJ 2005 pp 52).

In addition it has also brought out five cassettes and CDs, of Konknni music containing devotional songs and nursery rhymes and children's songs.

== Botanical collection ==
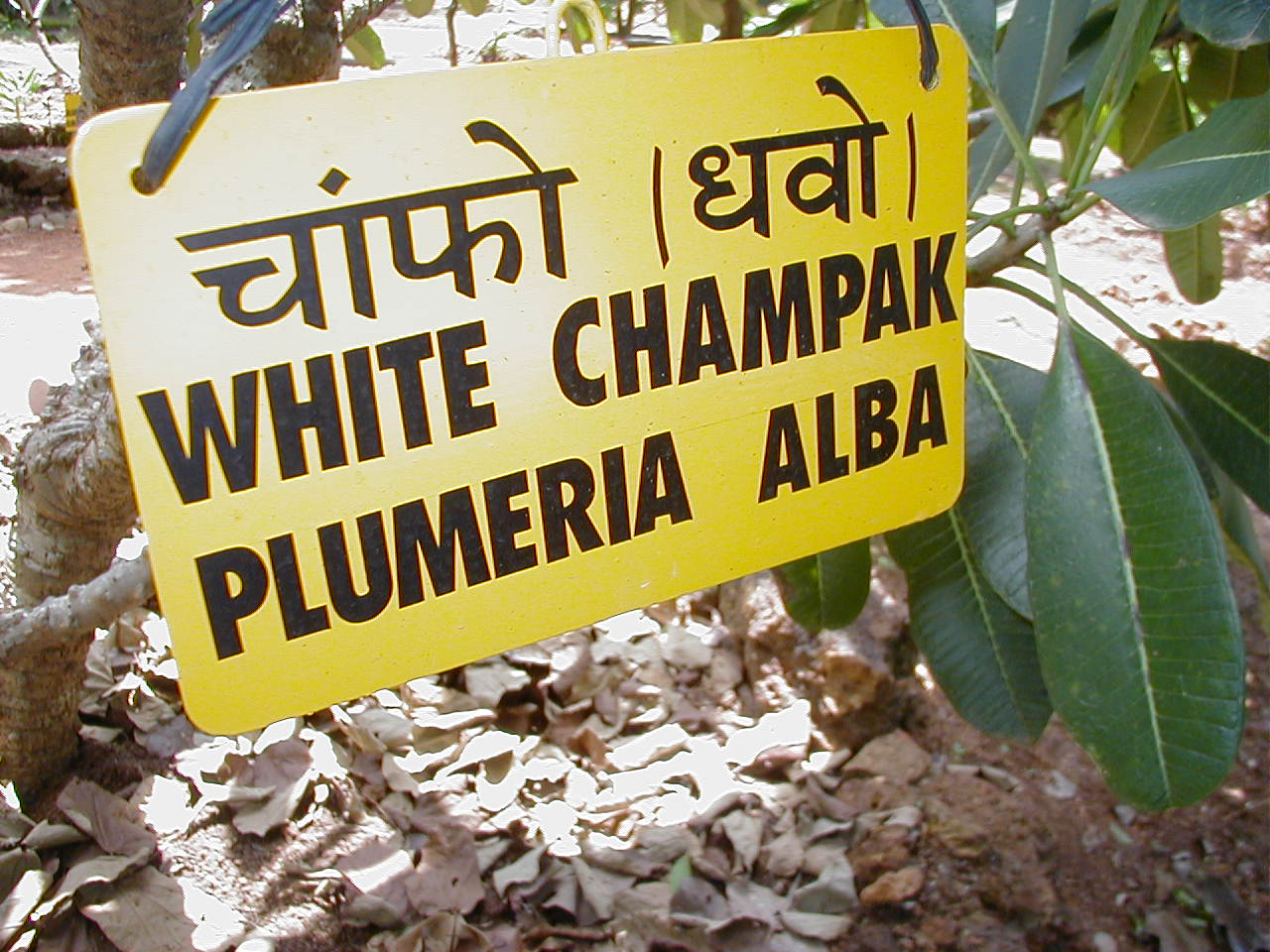
TSKK's botanical garden

Jesuit priest Pratap Naik sj, director of the TSKK currently, has been building a collection of over 328 trees and plants, all in the yard of a research institution studying the local Konknni language. Naik argues that the culture of a place is reflected "not only" in its language, but also in its flora—apart from its fauna, architecture, food habits and dress.

He has been quoted saying that he wants to grow one of every fruit-bearing tree that grows in Goa which is rich in plant diversity. This richness is thanks in significant part to plant exchanges by the former rulers who centuries back controlled international seaways and had an empire straddling the continents.

Visible are the local names in Konknni, the botanical names and their English names. Elsewhere, he keeps a list of the original native countries of these Goa-adopted plants.

Among the collection are the ainno madd (the Fan Palm in English, or Livistona rotundifolia as it's known by its botanical name). It comes from tropical America. There's the ambaddo, dismissively perhaps called the hog-plum that traces its origins to India itself. The ambor (mulberry, or Morus alba) has Chinese origins. Kalljirem (black cumin, Nigella sativa) is again of Indian origin.

Kiraitem (canscora in English, or Canscora decussata) is from India, but the zaifoll (nutmeg, Mystica fragans) comes from the Moluccas, the so-called Spice Islands of past centuries, in the Far East. Gozgo (the fever nut or Caesalpinia bonduc) is, again, of Indian origin.

Naik says he has already found the names of 325 species from among the 329 he planted. "Some don't have names in Konknni (the local language)," he is quoted as saying, obviously because of their exotic origins.

== See also ==
- List of Jesuit sites
