= Krista Purana =

1616 epic poem by Thomas Stephens

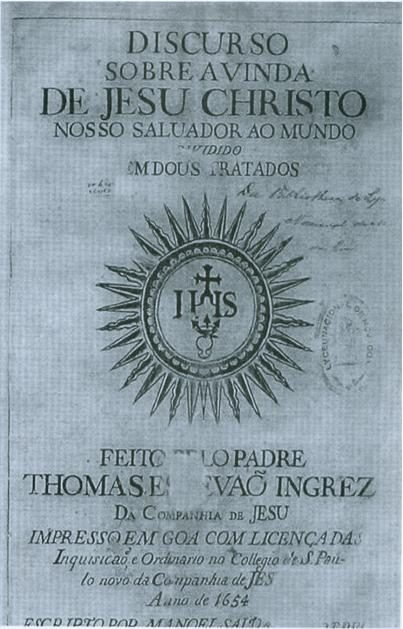
- The third edition of the Krista Purana (1654)
- Author: Thomas Stephens
- Language: Marathi
- Subject: Christianity
- Publisher: College of Rachol, Goa
- Publication date: 1616
- Publication place: India
- Media type: Manuscript
- Followed by: Doutrina Christam em Lingoa Bramana Canarim

Krista Purana (/ˈkɾist̪ə puˈɾaːɳə/; Devanagari: क्रिस्त पुराण, lit. 'The Christian Puranas') is an epic poem on the life of Jesus Christ written in a mix of Marathi and Konkani by English Jesuit priest Thomas Stephens. Adopting the literary form of the Hindu puranas, it retells the entire story of mankind from the creation days to the time of Jesus, in lyrical verse form. The Christian Puranas – 11,000 stanzas of 4 verses – were very popular in the churches of the area where they were sung on special occasions up to the 1930s. Although no copy of the original edition has yet been discovered, it is believed to have been first published at the College of Rachol in 1616, then re-published posthumously in 1649 and 1654.

== Editions ==
1. Discurso sobre a vinda do Jesu-Christo Nosso Salvador ao mundo, dividido em dous Tratados, pelo Padre Thomaz Estevão, Inglez, da Companhia de Jesu. Impresso em Rachol com licencia da Santa Inquisicão, e Ordinario no Collegio de Todos os Santos da Companhia de Jesu Anno 1616. First edition, Rachol [Raitur], Goa, 1616. [Roman script.]
2. Puranna. Second edition, 1649. [Roman script.]
3. Puránna. Em Goa com licenca da Santa Inquisicao e Ordinario no Collegio de S. Paolo novo de Companhia de Jesu. Anno de 1654. Third edition, Old Goa [according to Drago], 1654. [Roman script.] Licences by Rev. Fr Lucas da Cruz and another, dt. 2 January 1653 and 22 June 1654. No copy has been traced to date. See, however, the manuscript preserved in the Central Library, Panjim, listed below, which claims to be a copy of this third, 1654, edition.
4. 4th edition, by Joseph L. Saldanha, 1907. Copies available.
5. Phādara Stīphanskṛta Khristapurāṇa: Paile va Dusare. 5th edition, by Shantaram P. Bandelu. First [printed edition in] Devanagari script. Poona: Prasad Prakashan, 1956. Pp. iv+(15)+(96)+1076. [Copies available at De Nobili College, Pune; United Theological College, Bangalore.]
6. Kristapurāṇa. 6th edition, by Caridade Drago, SJ. Second [printed edition in] Devanagari script. Pp. li+907. Mumbai: Popular Prakashan, 1996. [Copies available at Thomas Stephens Konknni Kendr, Alto Porvorim, Goa; Divyadaan: Salesian Institute of Philosophy, Nashik.]
7. Phādara Thomas Stīphanskṛta Khristapurāṇa: Purāṇa 1 va 2: Sudhārita ani vistārita sampurṇa avṛtti hastalikhita Mārsden Marāṭhi padya pratitīla śloka, Marāṭhi bhāṣāntara; vistṛta sandarbha, parisiste va granthasuchi. Ed. and tr. Nelson Falcao, SDB. Bangalore: Kristu Jyoti Publications, 2009.
8. "Christa Purana" (Konkani Translation). Edited and Translated by Suresh G. Amonkar. Goa: Directorate of Art and Culture, 2017.

== Manuscripts ==
=== In India ===
At least five manuscripts of the Krista Purana have been located to date in Goa, India:

1. The Goa Central Library manuscript: Discurso sobre a vinda de Jesu Christo Nosso Salvador ao Mundo dividido em dous tratados feito pelo Padre Thomas Estevão Ingrez da Companhia de Jesus. Impresso em Goa com licenca das Inquisicão, e Ordinario no Collegio de S. Paulo novo de Companhia de Jesu. Anno de 1654, Escripto por Manoel Salvador Rebello, Natural de Margão no Anno 1767. (CL)
2. The Pilar manuscript, at the Museum of the Pilar Monastery, Pilar, Goa. (P)
3. The M.C. Saldanha manuscript at the Thomas Stephens Konknni Kendr, Alto Porvorim, Goa (TSKK-1). Whether this M.C. Saldanha is the same as the well-known professor Mariano Saldanha of Ucassaim, Goa, is yet to be established. But from the fact that the manuscript has been bound in Kodailbail, Mangalore, it is highly probable that this is one of the 5 manuscript used by J.L. Saldanha in the preparation of his 1907 edition of the Krista Purana.
4. Another manuscript at the Thomas Stephens Konknni Kendr (TSKK-2).
5. The Bhaugun Kamat Vagh manuscript in the Pissurlencar Collection at the Goa University Library (BKV).

Apart from CL, the manuscripts are not dated. The chronology will therefore have to be established from internal evidence, taking into account the terminology (Romanized or Sanskritized), the number of cantos and strophes, the interpolations, the Praise of Marathi (missing in the Marsden manuscript), the chapter on the Miracle at Cana (missing in the Marsden manuscript), etc. This will also help us move closer to establishing whether or not the Sanskritized M was the 'original' text of the Krista Purana.

At least two manuscripts of the Krista Purana have been located to date in Mangalore, India:

1. Manuscript, Kannada script. Carmelite Monastery, Kulshekara, Mangalore. See Fr Santhamayor.
2. St Aloysius College, Mangalore.

=== In the United Kingdom ===
1. The Adi or First Puran + The Deva Puran. [Devanagari manuscripts.] Marsden Collection Manuscripts. London: School of Oriental and African Studies. N.d.

== See also ==
- Puranas
- Bible translations into the languages of India

== Bibliography ==
- Coelho, Ivo. (2009). "Thomas Stephens' Khristapurāṇa: A New Edition and Translation by Nelson Falcao, SDB". Divyadaan: Journal of Philosophy and Education. 20 (3): 473–482.
- ————— (April 2010). "Review Article: A Significant Publication". Vidyajyoti Journal of Theological Reflection. 74/4: 307–314. [Review of Phādara Thomasa Stīphanskṛta Khristapurāṇa, ed. and tr. Nelson Falcao (Bangalore: Kristu Jyoti Publications, 2009.]
- Falcao, Nelson (2003). Kristapurāṇa, a Christian-Hindu encounter: a study of inculturation in the Kristapurāṇa of Thomas Stephens, S.J. (1549-1619). Anand: Gujarat Sahitya Prakash. ISBN 81-87886-72-2.

=== Primary sources ===
- Saldanha, Joseph L. (1907). The Christian Puránna of Father Thomas Stephens of the Society of Jesus: A Work of the 17th Century: Reproduced from manuscript copies and edited with a biographical note, an introduction, an English synopsis of contents and vocabulary. Bolar, Mangalore: Simon Alvares.
