= Thomas Stephens (Jesuit) =

English Jesuit priest and writer (1549–1619)

- Portrait of Thomas Stephens
- Born: c. 1549; Bushton, Wiltshire, England
- Died: 1619 (aged 69–70)

Thomas Stephens SJ (c. 1549 – 1619) was an English Jesuit priest, missionary, writer, and linguist of Marathi and Konkani in Portuguese India. Educated at Oxford, he was one of the earliest Western Christian missionaries to early modern India. He, along with Roberto de Nobili, helped in converting the top class of Indian society by adopting local practices and writing books in local languages, to appeal to the local people. He is famous for having written the Krista Purana (Story of Christ) laid down in meters of bhakti poetry.

In Portuguese, he was known as Tomás Estevão, or alternatively Tomás Esteves.

== Early years and studies ==
The son of a merchant, Thomas Stephens was born a Protestant in Bushton, Wiltshire, England. He was first educated at Winchester College, then at Oxford, before becoming a Catholic. He went to Rome where he entered the Society of Jesus in 1575. He studied philosophy at the Collegio Romano before departing for Lisbon, en route for Goa which he reached on 24 October 1579, likely considered to be among the earliest English settlers in India. This is, however, disputed by G. Schurhammer and others. After a few months of theological studies he was ordained to the priesthood in 1580. He learned to read and write in Konkani and Marathi.

== In Goa ==
Stephens was the Jesuit Superior of Salcete from 1590 to 1596. Except for a year in Vasai (Bassein), a Portuguese holding north of Bombay (Mumbai), he spent all his pastoral years in Salcete, being parish priest in Margão, Benaulim, Marmugão, Navelim and several other places. He died in Goa in 1619.

It is very likely that Roberto de Nobili, SJ, met Stephens upon landing in Goa, and before proceeding to the Madurai Mission, because both used similar terms, such as jnana-snana (bath of knowledge or enlightenment), a term which Stephens used for baptism and which de Nobili seems to have borrowed; the term is still current in Tamil Christian usage.

In 1583, Stephens wrote a letter to his brother noting similarities between Indian languages and Greek and Latin. This letter remained unpublished until 1957. This observation did not lead to any further scholarly inquiry but it foreshadowed the later discovery of the Indo-European language family.

== Variations in the name ==
There are many variations of Stephens' name. Cunha Rivara notes that the Bibliotheca Lusitana "clearly but erroneously calls him Esteves." J.L. Saldanha observes: "Among his clerical brethren he was known as Padre Estevam, and the laity seem to have improved upon the appellation and turned it into Padre Busten, Buston, and the grand and high-sounding de Bubston". Saldanha also notes that Monier-Williams renders the name 'Thomas Stevens', while also pointing out that Dodd's Church History speaks of Stephen de Buston or Bubston. Mariano Saldanha instead gives the name as 'Tomás Estêvão'. The Catholic Encyclopedia itself seems to have two entries for the same person: Thomas Stephens and Thomas Stephen Buston.

== Achievements ==
=== In English ===
Before the end of the century he was already known in England thanks to a letter written to his father, and published in the 2nd volume of Richard Hakluyt's Principal Navigations (in 1599) in which he gives a description of Portuguese India and its languages.

=== In Konkani ===
Stephens is remembered above all for his contribution to the Konkani in the Roman script. His Arte da lingoa Canarim, written in Portuguese, was the first printed grammar of what is now called the Konkani language. It was published in 1640, as enlarged by Diogo Ribeiro, SJ, and four other Jesuits, and became the first ever printed Indian Language grammar. The published work bore the title Arte da lingoa Canarim composta pelo Padre Thomaz Estevão da Companhia de IESUS & acrecentada pello Padre Diogo Ribeiro da mesma Cõpanhia e nouemente reuista & emendada por outros quarto Padres da mesma Companhia. 1640. A second edition was produced by J.H. da Cunha Rivara, and published under the title: Grammatica da Lingua Concani composta pelo Padre Thomaz Estevão e accrescentada por outros Padres da Companhia de Jesus. Segunda Impressão, correcta e annotada, a que precede como introducção A Memoria sobre a Distribução Geographica das Principaes Linguas da India por Sir Erskine Perry, e o Ensaio historico da lingua Concani pelo Editor. Ed. J.H. da Cunha Rivara. Nova Goa: Imprensa Nacional. 1857. The language, called Canarim or Bramana-Canarim in Stephens' time, was, by the time of Cunha Rivara, known as Konkani. In 2012, a facsimile print of the 1640 edition was published in Goa.

Stephens also prepared a catechism in the same language, as per the instruction of the Council of Trent. The Doutrina Christam em Lingoa Bramana Canarim (translation: Christian Doctrine in the Canarese Brahman Language) incorporates also a collection of Christian prayers in Konkani. It is the first Konkani Book to be published and has the distinction of being the second book published in an Indian language behind a book of similar kind in Tamil published from Old Goa.

Thomas Stephens devised many orthographic conventions used in Romi Konkani, like the doubling of consonants to represent retroflex sounds.

=== In Marathi ===
==== The Christian Purana or the Khristapurana ====
More than technical language books, what earned him the title of Father of Christian Literature in India is his Krista Purana, an epic poem on the life of Jesus Christ written in a mix of Marathi and Konkani. Adopting the literary form of the Hindu puranas it retells the entire story of mankind, from the creation days to the time of Jesus in lyrical verse form. The Christian Puranas - 11,000 stanzas of 4 verses - were popular in the churches of the area where they were sung on special occasions up to the 1930s. Although no copy of the original edition is extant, it is believed to have been published in 1616.

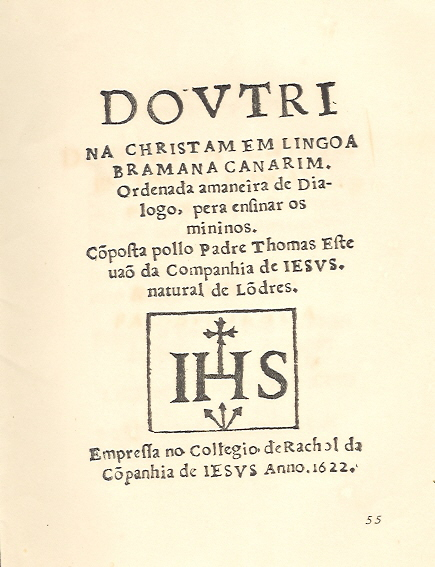
Title page of Dovtrina Christam by Fr. Thomas Stephens, first published work in Konkani

The Khristapurana of Thomas Stephens was printed thrice in Goa, in 1616, 1649, and 1654, but no copies have been found. The fourth printing was that of Joseph L. Saldanha in Mangalore (1907); this was a collation of at least 5 manuscripts, one of them in Devanagari script, together with a substantial life sketch and introduction. The fifth edition was by Prof. Shantaram Bandelu of Ahmednagar; this was the first printed edition in the Devanagari script, but was a transliteration of the Saldanha text.

In 1923, however, Justin E. Abbott discovered two Devanagari manuscripts (parts 1 and 2) of the Khristapurana in the Marsden Collection of the School of Oriental Studies, London. Bandelu acknowledges this discovery in his introduction, but argues, against Abbot, that the Roman script was the original. He was not able, however, to make proper use of the manuscripts in his text. This job fell to Caridade Drago, SJ; but here also it would seem that Drago merely followed the Bandelu text, contenting himself with providing an extensive appendix in which he compares the variations between the Roman and the Devanagari script texts.

In 2009 Nelson Falcao published the seventh edition of the Khristapurana, providing for the first time the Marsden version in Devanagari script, together with a prose translation into contemporary Marathi. An English translation with transliteration of the Marsden version into Roman script was published in 2012.

==== Paixão de Cristo ====
S.M. Tadkodkar has attributed two of the three Passion poems found in the Goa Central Library MS of the Khristapurana to Thomas Stephens.

== Recognition ==
The Thomas Stephens Konknni Kendr, run by the Society of Jesus, is an institute dedicated to the study and propagation of the Konkani Language; it was founded in 1989 and located in Goa. It was named after Father Thomas Stephens in gratitude for his contribution to the Konkani language.

It possesses two manuscripts of the Khristapurana, one of which seems to have belonged to a certain M.G. Saldanha, and may have been one of the copies used by J.L. Saldanha while preparing his monumental 1907 edition (he speaks of a Marian Saldanha, whom he describes as an enthusiast of Puranic literature). Whether this M.G. Saldanha is the same as the well-known Goan professor and scholar Mariano Saldanha, is yet to be established.

The Father Thomas Stephens Academy was established in 1995 in Vasai (Bassein) by Andrew J. Colaco.

The Father Stephens Academy educational trust was founded on 31 December 1994 in the village of Giriz, Taluka Vasai (Bassein), Palghar District. Mr. Andrew Joseph Colaco is the founder and chairman of the trust. The trust runs an English medium school from kindergarten to S.S.C. class [secondary]. The school building was blessed by the Bishop of Vasai, Thomas Dabre on 4 January 1998.

The story of Thomas Stephens is included in the book The First Firangis by Jonathan Gil Harris.

== See also ==
- Goan Inquisition

== Bibliography ==
- Ram Chandra Prasad: Early English Travellers in India, Delhi, Motilal Banarasi Dass, 1965, 392pp.
