= Igreja de Nossa Senhora das Neves =

Historical Catholic Church in Rachol, Goa

Coordinates: 15°18′30″N 74°00′38″E

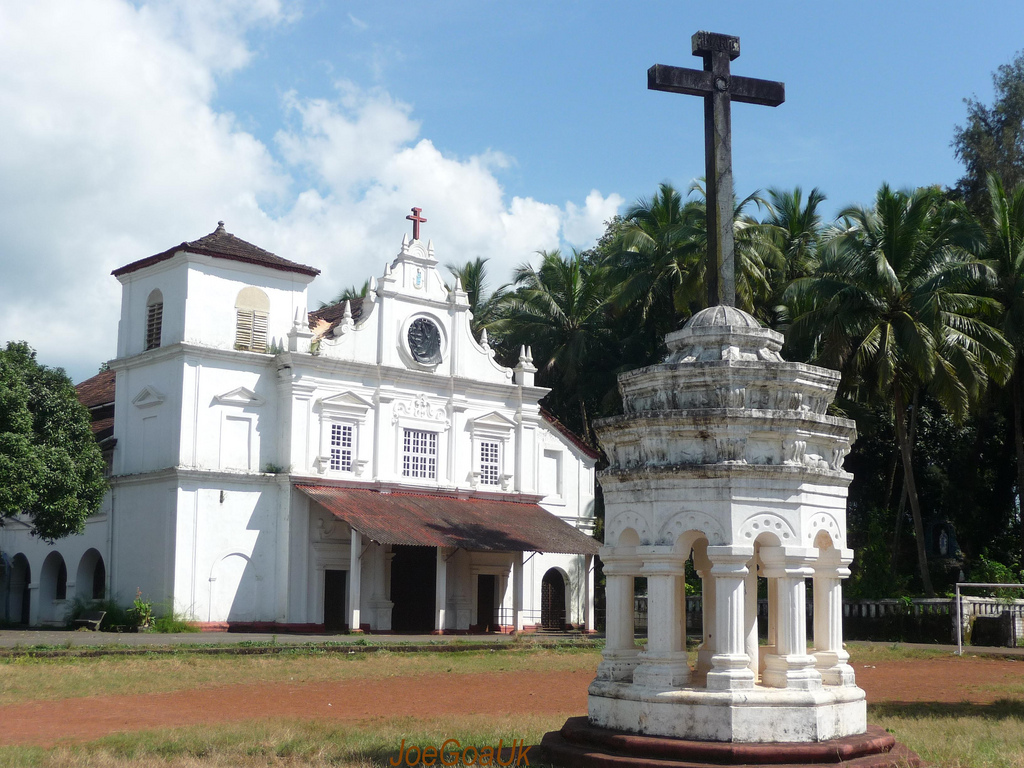
Igreja de Nossa Senhora das Neves and the ruins of the Rachol Fort.

The Igreja de Nossa Senhora das Neves (Church of Our Lady of the Snows) is a historical Catholic church in Rachol village, Salcete sub-district, on the southern banks of the Zuari river, in the South Goa district of Goa state, India. The church was built in the 1560's during the Goa Inquisition. It is situated in close proximity to the renowned Rachol Seminary. There is a church of the same name in the neighbouring village of Raia.

== History ==
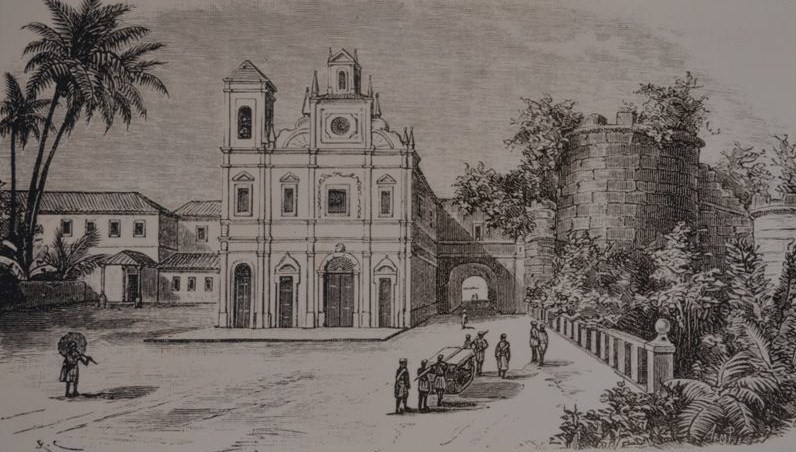
Historical portrait of the Igreja de Nossa Senhora das Neves and the Rachol Fort

The Colonial Portuguese Baroque style church was originally built with mud walls and a thatched roof, alongside the fort of Rachol. The Captain of the Rachol fortress (in Portuguese Capitão desta Fortaleza de Rachol) Diogo Rodrigues was appointed to carry out the work. It was completed in AD 1565.

The church was dedicated to Nossa Senhora das Neves (Our Lady of the Snows). It has been referred to as the "Mother church" (Matriz) for the whole of southern Goa and was named Igreja de Nossa Senhora das Neves. It was the Seat of the first Archbishop of Goa, Dom Gaspar Jorge de Leão Pereira who personally visited Margão and the surrounding areas to choose the location. The Archbishop shot an arrow into the ground at Rachol and ordered the church to be built there. The church was considered to be the first in the Salcette concelho (Salcette was called Ilha de Salcette do Sul at that time).

Two historical burials took place at the altar. The first burial was for the captain of the Fort (Capitão desta Fortaleza) Diogo Rodrigues in AD 1577. The second regards the massacre of Jesuit priests and civilians that occurred in the Cuncolim Revolt in July 1583. The martyrs' bodies remained in the church until AD 1597, after which they were moved to Saint Paul's College, Goa and laid to rest in Old Goa at the Cathedral in AD 1862.

== See also ==
- Colonial Goa
- Portuguese colonial architecture in India
- List of Jesuit sites
