= Diogo Rodrigues =

16th century Portuguese explorer

Governor of Salsette, Captain of Rachol Fortress

Personal details
- Born: c. 1490-1496 Lagos, Kingdom of Portugal
- Died: 21 April 1577 (aged 80–87) Colvá, Goa, Portuguese Empire
- Resting place: Igreja da Nossa Senhora de Neves
- Children: 2
- Occupation: Helmsman, Explorer, Governor of Salsette, Captain

Dom Diogo de Azevedo Rodrigues (diminutive: Roiz; c. 1490-1496 – 21 April 1577) was a Portuguese explorer of the Indian Ocean who sailed as an ordinary helmsman under the command of Dom Pedro Mascarenhas around Goa. They sailed from the Cape of Good Hope eastward into little-known waters of the newly discovered route to Goa. Rodrigues island was named after him between 4 and 9 February 1528 because he had discovered it during his only return journey from Goa via Cochin (left on 15 January 1528) to Lisbon, where he was elevated to the rank of a knight (cavaleiro) by John III of Portugal. He then returned to Goa and made a mark in the history of the Portuguese Empire in the subcontinent around the mid-16th century.

== Exploration and Diogo Rodrigues ==
In the early 16th century, Dom Diogo Fernandes Pereira was appointed captain of a Setúbal ship bound for Goa. He is said to have struck a wide arc east of Madagascar and stumbled upon the island of Réunion, which he promptly named ilha de Santa Apolónia (in honor of the St. Apollonia whose day it was, 9 February 1507). He then proceeded east to discover the island of Mauritius, which he named ilha do Cirne (the name of his ship). From there Fernandes went further east and discovered the island he named as ilha de Diogo Fernandes, Domigo Friz or Domingo Frias (the latter two probably are cartographic transcriptions or abbreviations of 'Diogo Fernandes'). He is also said to have stopped for water at the first and third islands, before returning to Mozambique. Diogo Fernandes island ('Domigo Friz') was visited by Dom Diogo Lopes de Sequeira in 1509 and the name 'Dom Galopes' (another transcribed abbreviation) sometimes appears for that island in some maps. It went through its final permanent name change to Rodrigues island a few years later, after another Portuguese explorer in 1528 when making their way back across the Indian Ocean from Goa navigated via the islands of Réunion, Mauritius and Rodrigues, naming this entire archipelago the Mascarenes Island, Mascarene or Mascarenhas Islands, after his countryman and commander Pedro Mascarenhas, who had been around before in 1512. It was around February 1528 itself that Diogo Rodrigues saw Rodrigues with such a drive along the group of Mascarene islands that bears his family name Rodrigues.

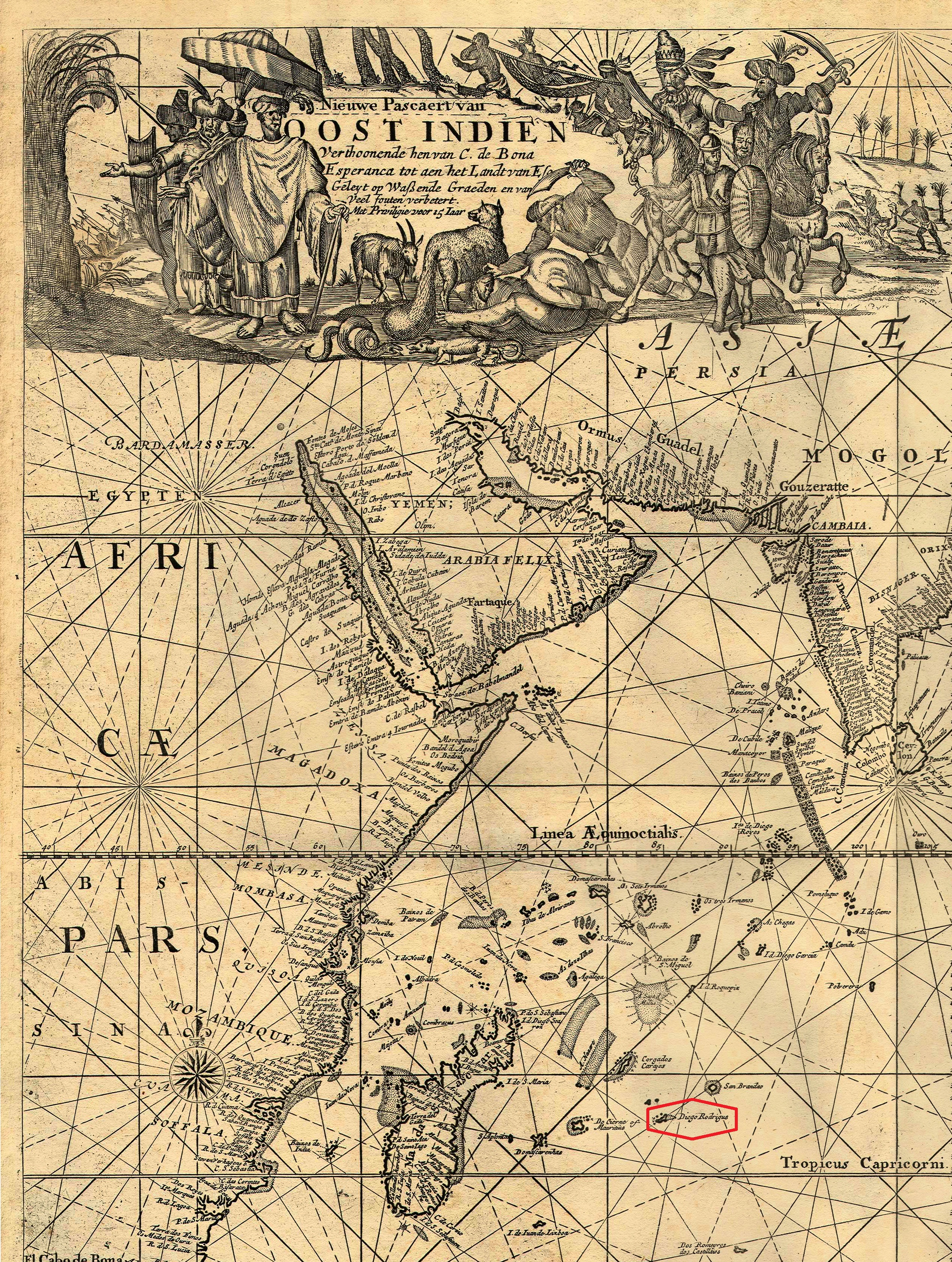
Detail of Mascarenes islands from a Dutch map of 1689 showing the island named as Diogo Rodrigues

== Life and legacy in Goa and Salsette ==
=== Governor of Salsette and Landlord of Colva ===
Rodrigues set up his base in Goa, learnt the local language, was commander of the construction for the fort of Goa and governor of the island of Salsette (later part of Bombay, present Mumbai) (called as ilha de Salcete do Norte at that time) as it was leased to him from 25 October 1535 to 1548 after the Treaty of Bassein between the Portuguese viceroy Dom Nuno da Cunha and Bahadur Shah of the Gujarat Sultanate that placed the islands into Portuguese possession from 1534. He was also known as Mestre Diego for his artistic contributions to the beautification of Salsette. Also in the defence of the fortress of Diu, Diu Fort whose reconstruction he was involved with, under the military leadership of Dom João de Castro in 1535 and the fort was considered impregnable later as it resisted for more than four centuries to multiple intrusion attempts. Diogo also owned the entire beach called "praia da Colva" (beach of Colva) in Goa that was passed on to his family descendants as a part of the family property, this is the same village where he constructed his huge residential house in 1551.

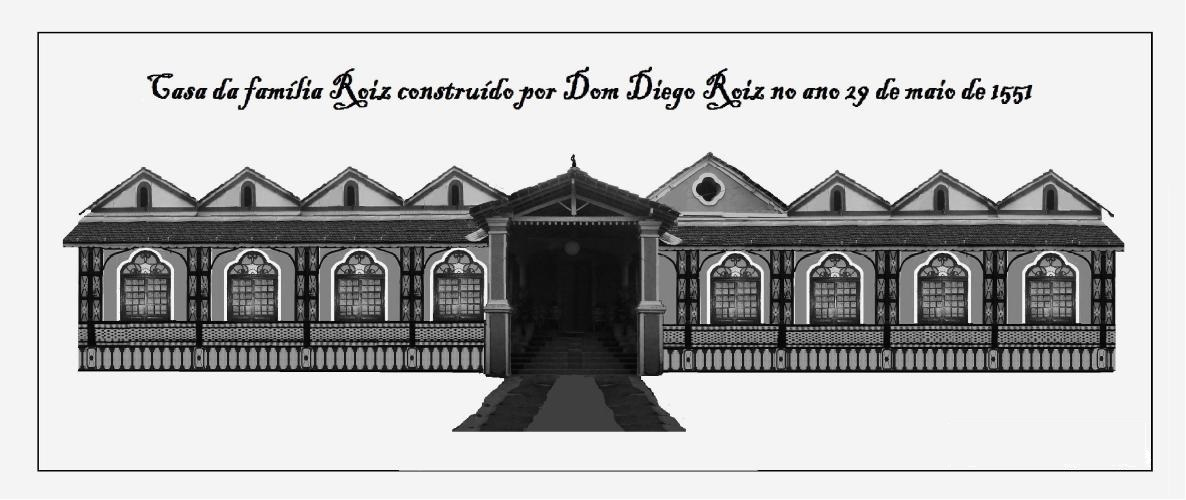
Residential house of Diogo Rodrigues and descendants from 1551

=== Captain of the fortress of Rachol ===
Rodrigues was the Captain of Rachol in Salcette, Goa, the chief town during the earliest Portuguese conquest. It was then a fortress and the church was considered as the first in dignity of Salcette (called as ilha de Salcete do Sul at that time); as this first church at Rachol and hence Salcette was built to completion in the year 1565, on the site of Hindu temples and was built in mud with a thatched roof. It can thus be called the mother church (Matriz) of the whole of South Goa and was named Igreja da Nossa Senhora de Neves. It was the first Archbishop of Goa, Dom Gaspar Jorge de Leão Pereira who personally visited Margão and its surrounding areas to choose the location. After visiting several places, he guarded an arrow into the ground at Rachol and ordered to build the church there; Rodrigues, the Captain of Rachol, was appointed to do the needful.

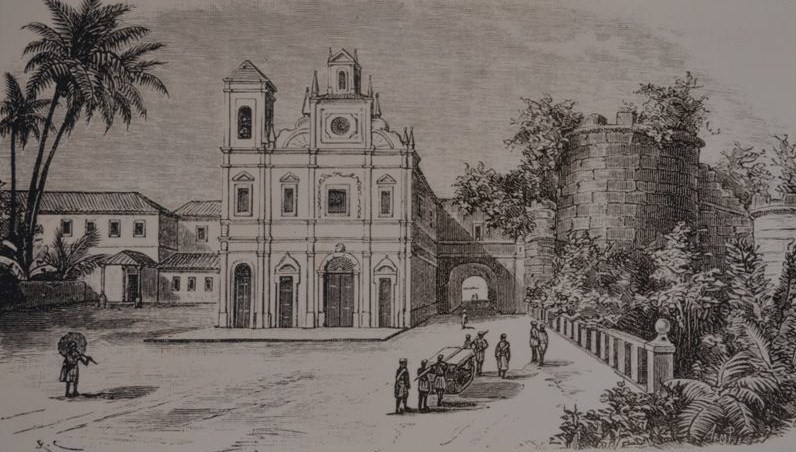
Igreja da Nossa Senhora de Neves and the Rachol Fort

José Nicolau da Fonseca has recorded that Diogo Rodrigues died in Colvá, Goa and was buried inside this mother church (Matriz) of Salcette of which he was the Captain of the fort at that time called Igreja da Nossa Senhora de Neves at Rachol with his grave's inscription reading: Aqui jaz Diogo Rodrigues o do Forte, Capitão desta Fortaleza, O qual derrubou os pagodes destas terras. Falleceu a 21 de Abril de 1577 annos. In English translation this reads: "Here lies Diogo Rodrigues (called) 'O do Forte/ Captain of this Fortress, who destroyed the pagodas of these territories. He died on the 21st April of the year 1577." The grave inscription stone and his relics are still inside the church, near the altar of Igreja da Nossa Senhora de Neves from 1577.

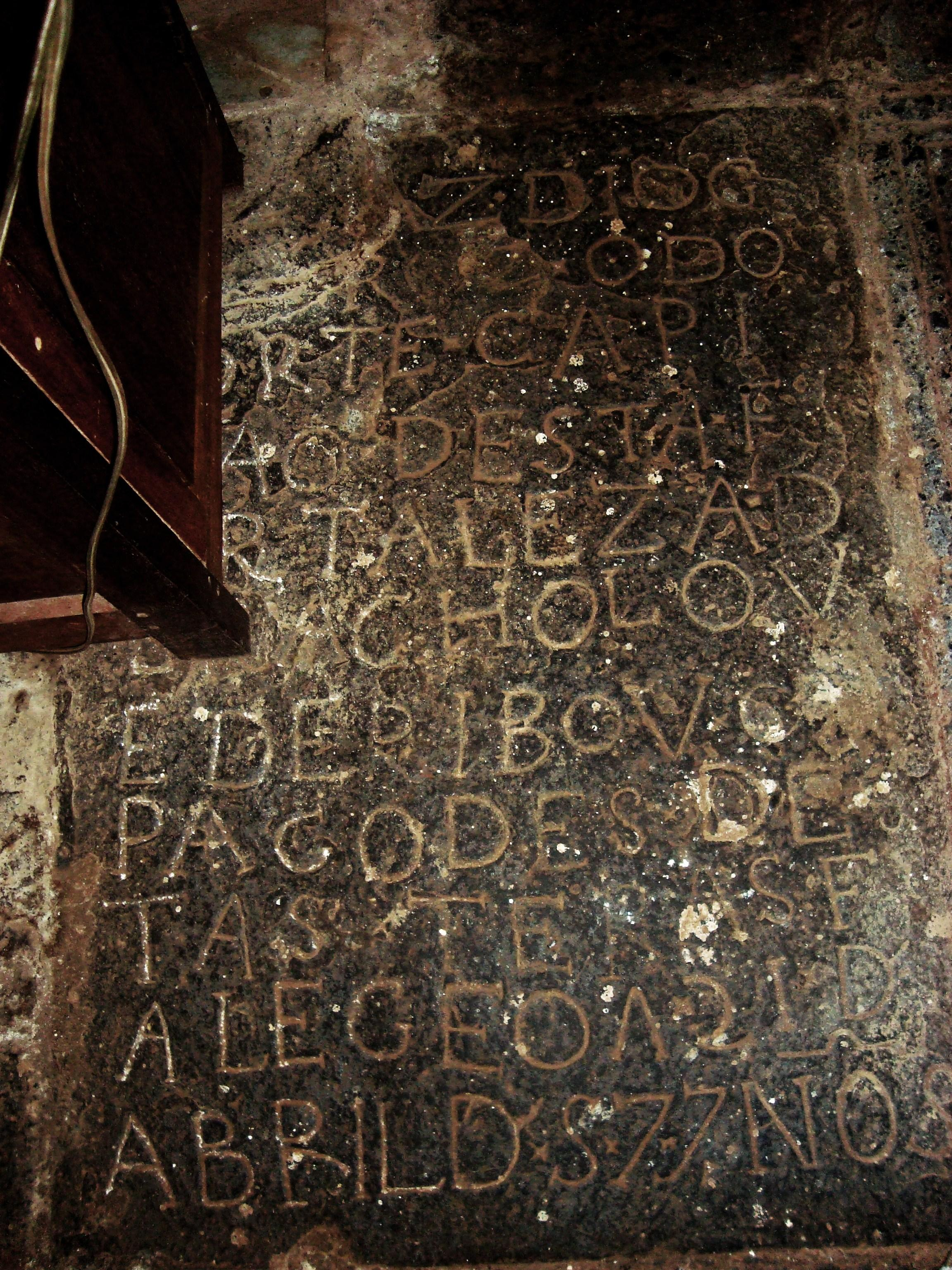
Inscription readings of Diogo Rodrigues burial place, photo clicked on 6 August 2012 (Intact\Untouched from 1577)

Following the christianization of the majority of Hindu villagers, Hindu temples of Salcette in Goa were destroyed by Diego who personally oversaw this destruction in 1567. This led to the mass exodus of Brahmins from the Portuguese held territories and the Brahmins taking the idols of their deities across the Zuari River to the territories of the Hindu Sonde Kings. Amongst the temples destroyed are the temples of Kamakshi, Shri Ramnathi, Shree Shantadurga and Shree Mangeshi. Diogo also destroyed nine temples in the village of Margão (Mathagrama), and he was rewarded with the revenues of the lands belonging to them. The destruction was triggered when a Jesuit was attacked and when the Brahmin community of Loutolim disobeyed Diogo Rodrigues, the then Captain of the Fort of Rachol as he had called them for a meeting about the attack, but they did not turn up. As a punishment to them, he burnt down the temple of Ramnath. The Brahmins filed a case with the Capitão às Justiças da sua Majestade in Goa. The magistrate ordered the Captain to rebuild the temple. With the support of the Archbishop Primaz and the Provincial Council, the Captain then obtained an Order from the Viceroy to burn down en masse the temples of Salcete, consequently the viceroy: Dom António de Noronha (1564–1568) at the request of the Archbishop and the Jesuits ordered Diogo Rodrigues to burn down all the remaining temples he found in Salcette, the viceroy also issued a decree in December 1565 forbidding the erection of new temples and the repairs of the existing ones, this was as stated: "I hereby order that in any area owned by my master, the King, nobody should construct a Hindu temple and such temples already constructed should not be repaired without my permission. If this order is transgressed, such temples shall be, destroyed and the goods in them shall be used to meet expenses of holy deeds, as punishment of such transgression." Diogo Rodrigues was also known as "O do Forte", In English: "Of the Strong", the Captain of Salcette who ordered the destruction of the temples of Assolna, Ambelim, Velim, Veroda, Cuncolim and Talvorda, when the villagers failed to obey some of his orders. The property and income of the temples were given to the church authorities. The exact date when the Captain Diogo Rodrigues demolished the temple of Malsa devi (to be converted into a Church of Our Lady of Conception in future) on 7 March 1567 just when the priest was about to bedeck the idol of Mahalasa with silver ornaments. Those ornaments were confiscated along with other valuables of the temple and a proper inventory of the movables was made, then began the act of destruction. The image in the sanctum sanctorum was broken to pieces allegedly because Fr. Luis Goes had denounced her as a ‘bad woman’. The Brahmins managed to spirit away other idols. Sacred books, Hindu works of art and the roof of the temple were destroyed. The Captain retreated after planting a Cross at the most prominent spot at the site. The details of the destruction of this temple are to be found in the Report of Irmão Gomes Vaz dated 12 December 1567 which notes that the temple was totally destroyed on 14 March 1567. Diego Rodrigues destroyed 280 temples in Salcette alone. The idols from the demolished temples were shifted mainly to the New Conquest areas where, the Desais and the Sardesais, the Hindu feudal lords of Sultan Adil Shah of Bijapur, built new temples for the idols.

== Rodrigues Island ==
Alfred North-Coombes records that maps of the island dated to 1540 of Plate 49 of the monumenta shows charts from both atlases and indicates as "do d0 ROIZ" also the Wolfenbuttel chart of c. 1540 carried the following inscriptions "i que achou Diogo Roiz". Dom Diogo's surname Rodrigues was replaced by Roiz later after receiving his knighthood (or Royes as it was written in some Dutch maps) as it was a royal diminutive of Rodrigues, who was knighted and received the royal confirmation from King João III, an honor granted only to those Rodrigues aristocratic families for service to the monarch or empire. It is also concluded that the exact date of discovering the island of Rodrigues by Diogo Roiz was between 4 and 9 February 1528 as they had left from Cochin under the command and presence of Pedro Mascarenhas on 15 January 1528 with a fleet of four ships to appeal to the King. Under favorable north-east monsoon conditions, it would take twenty to twenty five days to reach the Mascarene islands. The island was chosen to be called Rodrigues permanently from February 1528. Portugal did not claim any ownership, but used the island as a mark for sailing and had officially marked it on all maps, cartographic materials of that time either as Rodrigues, Diogo Roiz, Roiz or Diogo Rodrigues.

== Family and lineal descendants ==
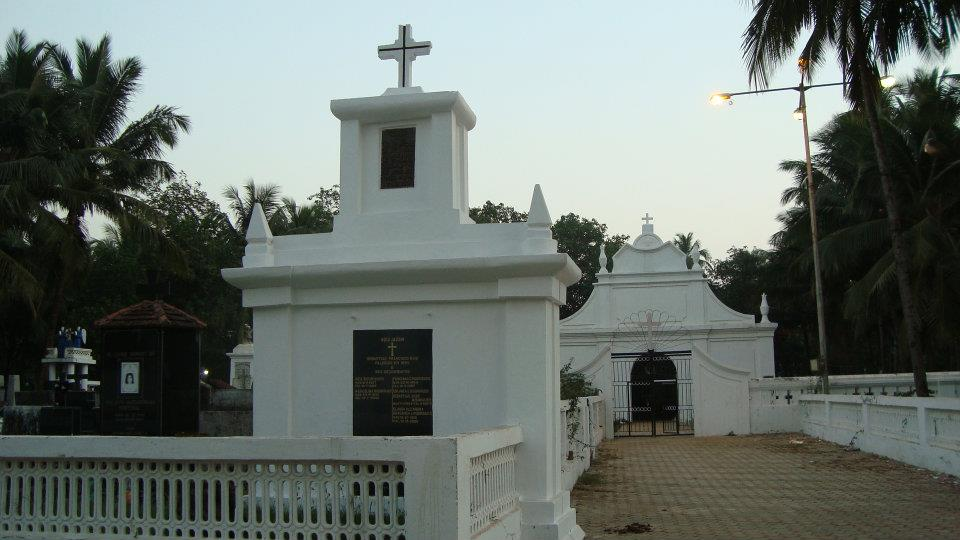
Roiz-Rodrigues Family Monument at Colva, Goa

Rodrigues married a woman belonging to the Prabhu (Prabhu Dessai - As today) family of Hindu feudal lords called Vitola Porob Dessay before 29 November 1512 and they had two sons, Dom Nicolau Roiz and Dom Inácio Roiz, as recorded in the letters available at the archives with document number ANTT: CC II, 35-162. The family used the diminutive of Roiz instead of its simple form Rodrigues until the late 19th century as the family name. The standing monument in Colva, Goa is the existing burial structural evidence with inscriptions of the Roiz (Rodrigues) family in Goa. This monument was rebuilt to a bigger structure in 1857 and still stands intact from 2 May 1857, as one of the great grandsons of D. Diogo died suddenly due to illness at a young age of 38 years, namely Dom Sebastião Francisco Roiz. The monument inscription reads: "Eis os restos de Seb F Roiz fala 18-8-1855 de 38 annos colla 2-5-57 ese pede aos viand pater no p'sua alma". In English translation: "This is the resting place of Sebastião Francisco Roiz who died on 18-08-1855 at 38 years of age and this monument was built in memory of him on the 02-05-1857 and for the resting of his family members". This is the only family in Colva of Goa with Roiz (Rodrigues) ancestry and one part of the descendants from his son Nicolau still live in the ancestral house that was built by Rodrigues in Colva, Goa and still owned parts of Colva beach property until the 21st century under Indian governance. The family monument is maintained by various family descendant members until date.

== Achievements ==
- Overseer of the Cannor Fortress :1515
- Discovered Rodrigues Island :1528
- Made a Fidalgo of the King of Portugal :1529
- Governor of Salsette on lease :1535-48
- Captain of Rachol Fortress :1554-77
- Lord of Colva :1550-77
