= Bahugun Anant Kamat Wagh =

Bahugun Anant Kamat Wagh was an official interpreter who worked under the Portuguese administration in Goa. His family originally belonged to the village of Panvel in Tiswadi. From 1719 to 1751, he was employed as a government translator tasked with translating between Marathi and Portuguese.

== Diplomatic activities ==
Wagh participated in several diplomatic missions and military operations on behalf of the Portuguese government:

- He joined Viceroy João de Saldanha da Gama on a military expedition against the Sawant Bhosales.
- He accompanied Viceroy Conde de Sandomil to conduct negotiations when Maratha forces surrounded the fort at Rachol.
- Following Maratha attacks on Bardez and Salcete in 1739, Wagh travelled to Rai for diplomatic discussions alongside a delegation that included Vyankati Kamat, Babuli Surthankar, Upi Kamat, Santu Shenvi Dangi, Narayan Prabhu, Minu Shenvi, and Vithoji Dhume.
- After the fort of Ponda was taken over by Mughal forces, Wagh was sent with Hire Porob Zvolkar to negotiate directly with the commander of the fort.
- He was assigned alongside Vithoji Dhume to negotiate a peace treaty with the Sawant-Bhosales, an agreement that resulted in the Portuguese obtaining control over the province of Bardez and the island of Panelim.
