= Cuncolim Revolt =

Massacre of Jesuit priests and civilians at Cuncolim, Portuguese Goa

- Part of Christianization of Goa
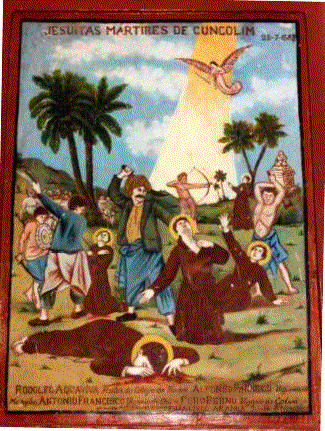
- A 17th-century painting in a church in Colva depicting the massacre of the five Jesuits
- Location: 15°10′53″N 74°00′01″E; Cuncolim, Portuguese Goa
- Date: 15 July 1583; 443 years ago
- Weapons: swords, clubs, machetes
- Deaths: 5 Jesuits; 14 Goan Catholics; 1 Portuguese civilian
- Injuries: none
- Perpetrators: Kshatriyas from Cuncolim; ~ 500 soldiers

The Cuncolim Revolt or Cuncolim Massacre (Portuguese: Os Mártires de Cuncolim) was a massacre that occurred on 15 July 1583, when Hindu chieftains in Cuncolim, Portuguese Goa, murdered and mutilated Jesuit priests and civilians. Five priests, one Portuguese civilian, and fourteen Goan Catholics were killed in the incident. The local Portuguese garrison retaliated by executing the village chieftains involved, and destroying the economic infrastructure of Cuncolim.

== Background ==
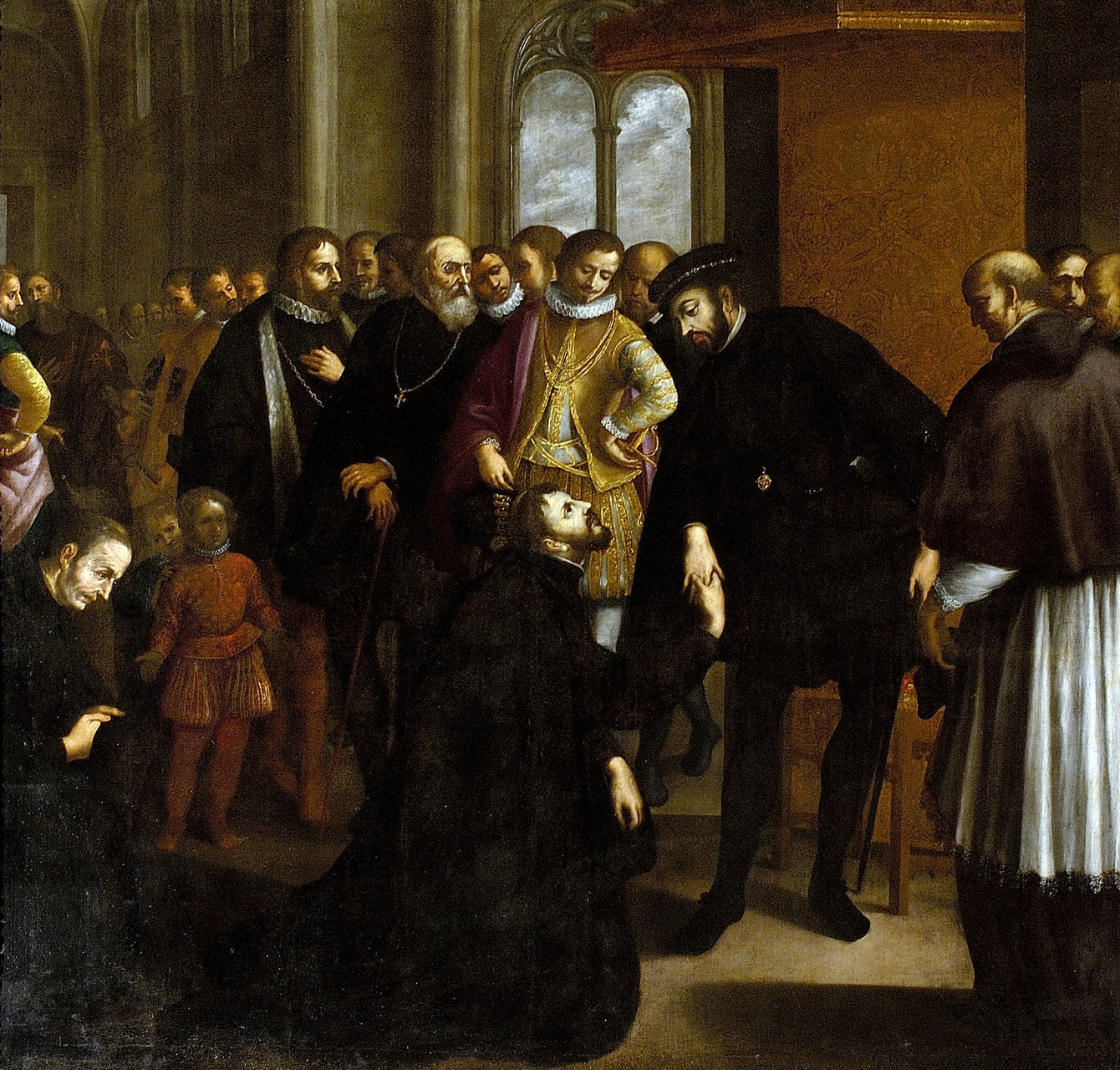
Painting showing Jesuit missionary Francis Xavier taking leave of John III of Portugal before his departure to Goa in 1541, by Avelar Rebelo (1635)

Following the Portuguese conquest of Goa by Afonso de Albuquerque in 1510, missionaries of various religious orders (Franciscans, Dominicans, Jesuits, Augustinians, etc.) were dispatched from Portugal to Goa with the goal of fulfilling the papal bull Romanus Pontifex, which granted the patronage of the propagation of the Christian faith in Asia to the Portuguese. To promote assimilation of the native Goans with the Portuguese people, the Portuguese authorities in Goa supported these missionaries.

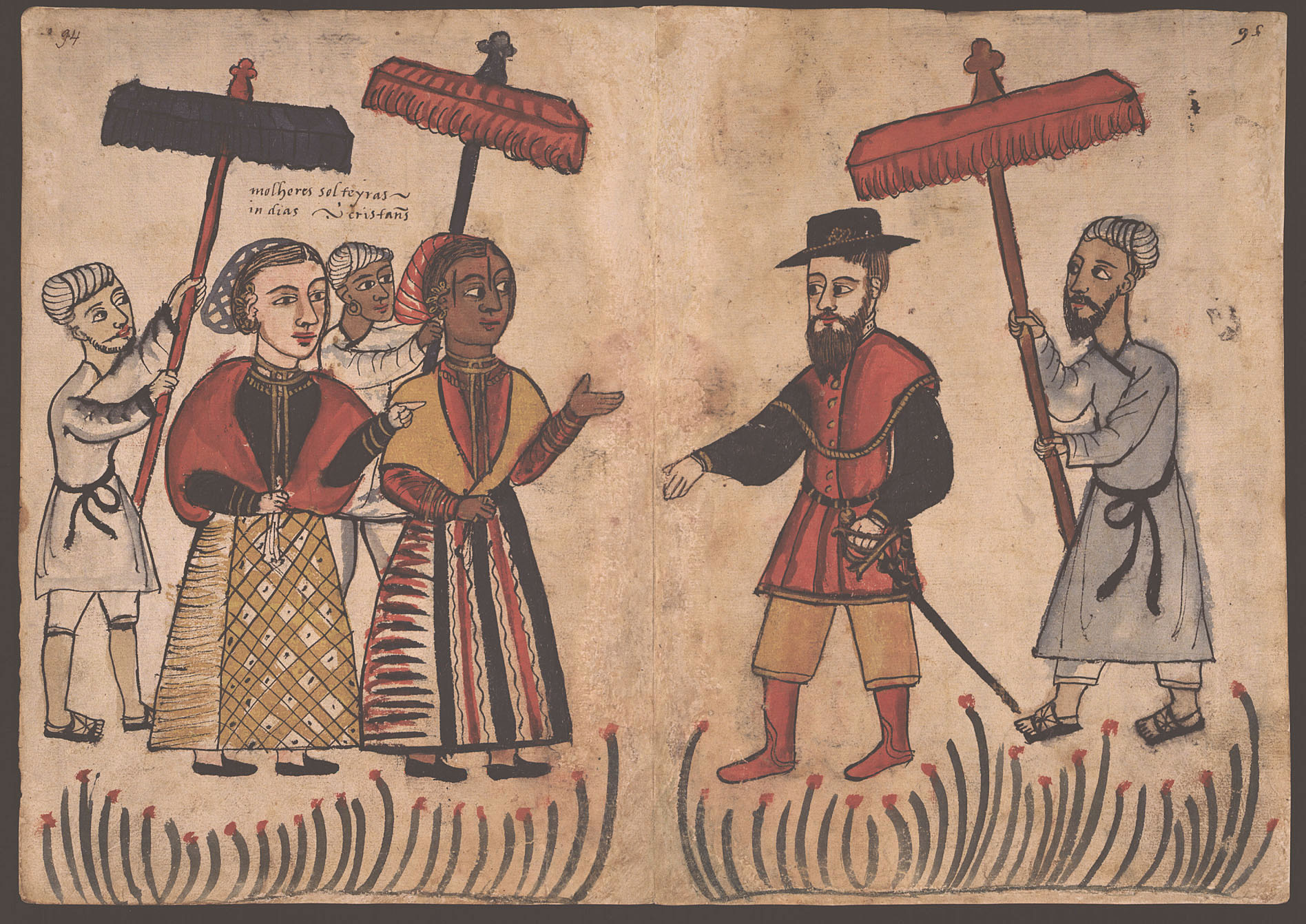
Christian maidens of Goa meeting a Portuguese nobleman seeking a wife, from the Códice Casanatense (c. 1540)

Almost half of Salcete (present-day Salcete and Morumugão sub-district) remained Hindu till 1575, but the city of Goa was almost completely Christian by this time.Tiswadi was completely Christianized by January 1563. Cuncolim was a frontier village, inhabited by a majority Hindu population. It was prosperous compared to neighbouring areas owing to its fertile land, with abundant and fresh water from rivers descending from the hinterland of Goa. Surplus agricultural production had enabled this village to develop crafts of a very skilled order and it was known for its metal work. As Afonso de Albuquerque wrote in his letters back to Portugal, guns of good quality were manufactured in Cuncolim, which he found comparable to those made in Germany.

There were 12 Vangodds (Konkani: clans) of Ganvkars (landlords) in Cuncolim. Their names, in order of precedence, were Mhal, Shetkar, Naik, Mangro, Xette, Tombdo, Porob, Sidakalo, Lokakalo, Bandekar, Rouno and Benklo. The Ganvkars, who held common ownership of the village and paid all taxes, were also the founders and caretakers of the main village temple in Cuncolim.

Cuncolim was reliant on a permanent bazaar at the end of more than one caravan route, connecting it with the mainland through the Ghats of Ashthagrahar province. In keeping with the traditional fairs and religious festivities, the economy of Cuncolim was dependant on its temple and religious celebrations. Due to this, there was an angry reaction from the Brahmin caste towards the attempts of the Jesuits, who sought to propagate Christianity in Cuncolim and its satellite villages of Assolna, Veroda, Velim and Ambelim in 1583. The abandonment of local temples by Goan Catholics would eventually entail the financial deprivation of the Brahmins.

The Ganvkars of Cuncolim refused to pay taxes to the Portuguese authorities. They built temples illegally on lands owned by converts to Christianity. They also rebuilt temples that had been demolished by the Bahamani Sultanate and Bijapur Sultanate before the arrival of the Portuguese. Hence, the Portuguese missionaries found it difficult to convert them.

The Portuguese chronicler Diogo do Couto described Cuncolim as "the leader of rebellions," and its people as "the dangerous of all villages of Salcete". Jesuit priest Alessandro Valignano described Cuncolim as 'rigid and obstinate' in its adherence to idolatry. This was due to their refusal to give up their native religions and customs.

== The massacre ==
Five Jesuits, including Rodolfo Acquaviva, met in the church at Orlim on 15 July 1583 and then proceeded to Cuncolim. They were accompanied by one Portuguese layman (Gonçalo Rodrigues) and 14 native converts, with the objective of erecting a cross and selecting ground for building a church. Meanwhile, several villagers in Cuncolim, after holding a council, advanced in large numbers, armed with swords, lances, and other weapons, towards the spot where the Christians were.

According to Anthony D'Souza, writing in the Catholic Encyclopaedia, Gonçalo Rodrigues leveled his gun at the advancing crowd, but was stopped by Alfonso Pacheco who said: "We are not here to fight." Then, he addressed the crowd in Konkani, their native language, he said "Do not be afraid". Following this, the villagers attacked the party.

Rodolfo received five cuts from a scimitar and a spear and was killed on the spot. According to D'Souza, he died praying to God to forgive the assailants. Next, the crowd turned on Peter Berno who was horribly mutilated, and Pacheco who, wounded with a spear, fell on his knees extending his arms in the form of a cross. António Francisco was shot with arrows, and his head was split open with a sword. Francisco Aranha, wounded at the outset by a scimitar and a lance, fell down a deep declivity into the thick crop of a rice-field, where he lay until he was discovered. He was then carried to a Hindu idol, to which he was bidden to bow his head. Upon his refusal to do this, he was tied to a tree and was shot to death with arrows. The spot where this tree stood is marked with an octagonal monument surmounted by a cross, which was repaired by the Patriarch of Goa in 1885.

Along with the five priests, Gonçalo Rodrigues and the 14 Goan Catholics were also killed. Of the latter, one was Domingo, a boy of Cuncolim, who was a student at Rachol Seminary, and had accompanied the priests on their expeditions to Cuncolim and pointed out to them the Hindu temples. He was killed by his own Hindu uncle for assisting the priests.

Afonso, a native of Margão or Verna, was an altar server of Pacheco and followed him closely, carrying his breviary. His hands were cut off on his refusal to part with the breviary and he was cut through his knee-joints to prevent his escape. The boy survived in this condition until the next day when he was found and killed. He was later buried in the Church of the Holy Ghost at Margao in South Goa. Several of the victims, including Francisco Rodrigues and Paolo da Costa had earlier affirmed their desire to be martyred for the Church.

=== Beatification of the priests ===
Following the massacre the bodies of the five priests were thrown into a well, water of which was afterwards sought by people from all parts of Goa for its miraculous healing. The well still stands today inside the St. Francis Xavier chapel situated at Maddicotto in Cuncolim and is opened for people to view once a year on the feast day of Francis Xavier, celebrated on 3 December.

Christian chroniclers state that the bodies themselves, when found, after two and a half days, allowed no signs of decomposition. They were solemnly buried in the Church of Our Lady of the Snows at Rachol, and remained there until 1597, when they were removed to the Saint Paul's College, Goa, and in 1862 to the Cathedral of Goa. Some of these relics have been sent to Europe at various times. All the bones of the entire right arm of Rodolfo were taken to Rome in 1600, and his left arm was sent from Goa as a present to the Jesuit College at Naples.

In accordance with the request of the Pacheco family, an arm and leg of Alfonso were sent to Europe in 1609. The process of canonisation began in 1600, but it was only in 1741 that Pope Benedict XIV declared the martyrdom proved. On the 16 April 1893, the five martyrs were beatified at St. Peter's in Rome.

== Portuguese retaliation and aftermath ==
The captain-major of Rachol in charge of the Portuguese Army garrison at the (now extinct) Assolna Fort, Gomes Eanes de Figueiredo, was determined to punish those responsible for the deaths of the victims. Consequently, the Portuguese army raided and destroyed orchards and fields surrounding the village.

The Hindu chieftains of Cuncolim, who had led the massacre, were then summoned to the Assolna fort situated on the banks of the River Sal (the Church of Regina Martyrum, built in memory of the martyred Christians, now stands at this location). Charged with treason, sixteen of them were sentenced to death by the Portuguese authorities. One escaped execution by jumping into the Assolna River through a toilet hole and fleeing to distant Karwar.

Following the execution of their leaders, the Hindu landlords of Cuncolim and neighbouring villages (Velim, Assolna, Ambelim and Veroda) rebelled by refusing to pay taxes on the produce generated from their fields and orchards to the Portuguese government. As a result, their lands were confiscated by the Portuguese Crown and entrusted to the Condado of the Marquis of Fronteira in 1585. Most of Cuncolim's villagers converted to Christianity in the years following the massacre. The Church of Nossa Senhora de Saúde was constructed by the Portuguese at the site of the massacre. The conversion of almost all of the villagers to Christianity forced the few remaining Hindus in Cuncolim to move their places of worship. The temple of the goddess Shantadurga Cuncolikarian was moved to the neighboring village of Fatorpa to the south.

== Biographies of the Jesuits ==
=== Rodolfo Acquaviva ===
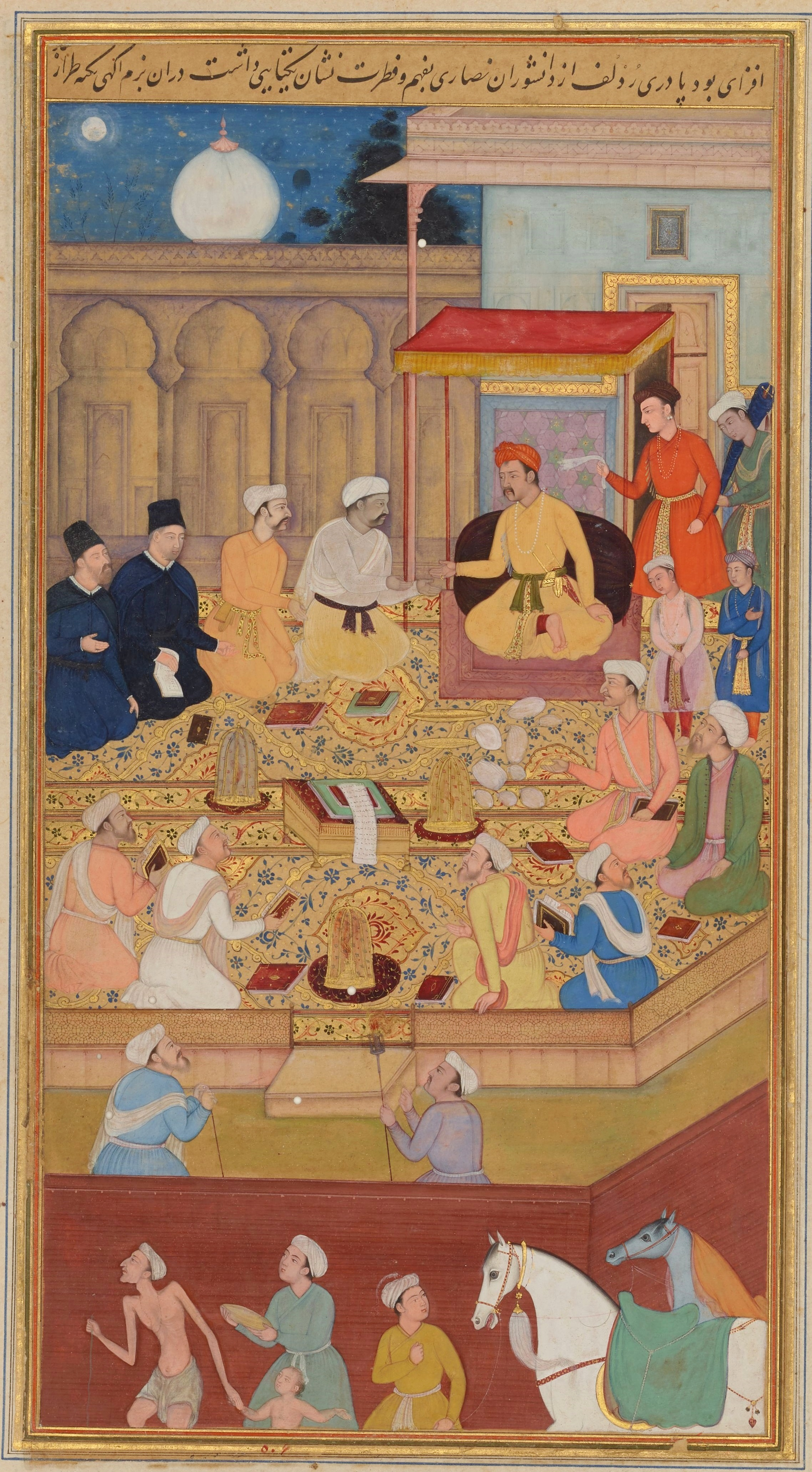
Illustration in the Akbarnama of the Ibadat Khana, on the left in blue is Bl. Acquaviva with his companion Fr. Henriques at his side

Rodolfo Acquaviva was born on 2 October 1550, at Atri in the Kingdom of Naples. He was the fifth child of the Duke of Atri and nephew of Claudio Acquaviva, the fifth General of the Society of Jesus, while on his mother's side he was a cousin of Aloysius Gonzaga. Admitted into the Society of Jesus on 2 April 1568, he landed in Goa on 13 September 1578. Shortly after his arrival he was selected for an important mission to the court of the emperor Akbar the great, who had sent an emissary to Velha Goa requesting that two learned missionaries might be sent to Fatehpur Sikri, the capital of the Moghul empire. After spending three years at the Mughal court, he returned to Goa, much to the regret of the whole court and especially of the emperor. On his return to Goa, he was appointed superior of the Salcette mission, a post he held until his martyrdom. After hearing of Acquaviva's death, Akbar is believed to have grieved; "Alas, father, my advice was good that you should not go, but you would not follow it."

=== Alphonsus Pacheco ===
Alphonsus Pacheco was born about 1551, in Minaya (Spain), and entered the Society on 8 September 1567. In September 1574, he arrived in Goa, where he so distinguished himself by his rare prudence and virtue that in 1578; he was sent to Europe on important business. Returning to India in 1581, he was made rector of Rachol Seminary. He accompanied two punitive expeditions of the Portuguese to the village of Cuncolim, and was instrumental in destroying the pagodas there.

=== Peter Berno ===
Peter Berno (or Berna) was born of humble parents in 1550 at Ascona, a Swiss village at the foot of the Alps. After being ordained priest in Rome, he entered the Society of Jesus in 1577, arrived in Goa in 1579, and was soon appointed to Salcete. He accompanied the expeditions to Cuncolim, and assisted in destroying the Hindu temples, destroyed an ant-hill which was deemed very sacred, and killed a cow which was also an object of Hindu worship. He used to say constantly that no fruit would be gathered from Cuncolim and the hamlets around it till they were bathed in blood shed for the Faith. His superiors declared that he had converted more pagans than all the other fathers put together.

=== Anthony Francis ===
Anthony Francis, born in 1553, was a poor student of Coimbra in Portugal. He joined the Society in 1571, accompanied Pacheco to India in 1581, and was shortly afterwards ordained priest in Goa. It is said that whenever he said Mass, he prayed, at the Elevation, for the grace of martyrdom; and that on the day before his death, when he was saying Mass at the church of Orlim, a miracle prefigured the granting of this prayer.

=== Francis Aranha ===
Francis Aranha was born of a wealthy and noble family of Braga in Portugal, about 1551, and went to India with his uncle, the first archbishop of Goa, Gaspar de Leão Pereira. There he joined the Society of Jesus on 1 November 1571. Being a skilled draughtsman and architect, he built several fine chapels in Goa.

This beatification was celebrated in Goa in 1894, and the feast has ever since then been kept with great solemnity at Cuncolim, even by the descendants of those who participated in the murders. The Calendar of the Archdiocese of Goa has fixed 27 July as their feast day.

== Reception ==
The native Goans and the Portuguese layman who were killed along with the five Jesuits were excluded from the list of the Martyrs of the Faith, when the Church opened its beatification process. According to writer Délio de Mendonça, this was due to the then prevailing attitude among the missionaries that the resident Catholics were by nature incapable of performing spiritual feats.

In 2003, a memorial to the Hindu chieftains was constructed in Cuncolim, on the initiative of Verissimo Coutinho, head of the Cuncolim Chieftains Memorial Trust. Prior to its construction, however, the memorial had met with strong opposition from the local Catholic parish, on the grounds of its proximity to another memorial built 102 years ago in memory of the five slain Jesuit priests. Cuncolim parish priest Fr. Socorro Mendes, had said, "No doubt the memorial needs to be built, but it is in violation of rules to construct anything within 100 metres of any historical monument", adding, "The existing historical fact should not be eclipsed with another one". Some church authorities had argued that the memorial should have been built in Assolna instead, where the Hindu chieftains were killed.

== See also ==
- Christian Kshatriyas

== Notes ==
- D'Souza, Oriente Conquistado;
- Goldie, First Christian Mission to the Great Mogul, The Blessed Martyrs of Cuncolim;
- Gracias, Uma Donna Portuegueza na Corte do Grao-Mogol (1907).
- Teotonio R. de Souza: Why Cuncolim martyrs? An historical re-assessment, in Jesuits in India in historical perspective, Macao, 1992.
- Mendonça, Délio de (2002), Conversions and citizenry: Goa under Portugal 1510–1610, Concept Publishing Company, ISBN 978-81-7022-960-5
