= Colva =

Village in Goa, India

Colva Praia de Colvá, Colluá, Coluvá, Kolluvá, Kolambe, Quoluva, Koleá
- Village (Historic village)
- Colvá
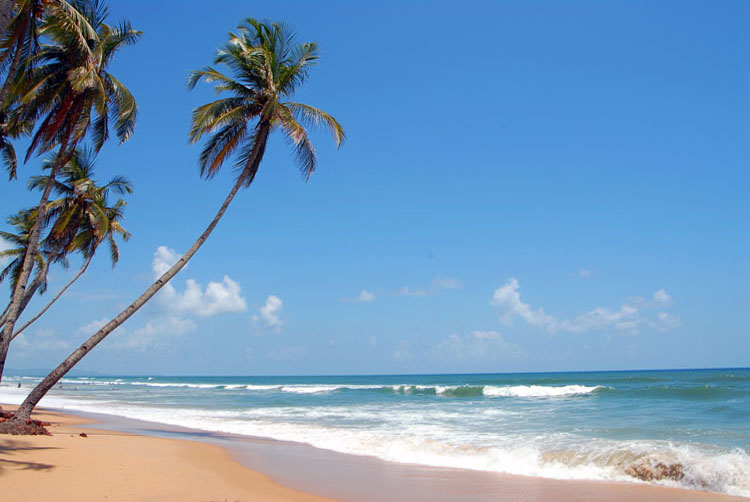
- Colvá beach
- Nicknames: Saxttichem Yead
- Location of Colva in Goa Colva (India)
- Coordinates: 15°16′34″N 73°55′02″E
- Country: India
- State: Goa
- District: Salcete, South Goa
- Elevation: 1.1 m (3.6 ft)
- Time zone: UTC+5:30 (IST)
- Postcode: 403708
- Area code: +91 832

Colva (Portuguese: Colvá) is a coastal village situated in the Salcete taluka, in South Goa district, of Goa state on the west coast of the Indian subcontinent. Colva Beach (Portuguese: Praia de Colvá) spans about 2.5 km (1.6 mi) along a sandy coastline of approximately 25 km (16 mi) extending from Bogmalo in the north to Cabo de Rama in the south.

The village had significant importance to the Portuguese, local (Gancars) noble chardó (Kshatriya) Feudal Lords and was the retreat for Goa's high, elite and aristocratic society, who would come to Colvá for their mudança (change of air), to enjoy the private beach of the then Roiz family. Today the Portuguese area is dotted with the past elite houses and modern villas, including many ruins from more than 300 years. On weekends, huge crowds of tourists, visitors from around the world as well as local Indians, enjoy the sunset and various activities. The beach is particularly busy in October, when hordes of religious pilgrims come and visit Colvá Church, called Igreja de Nossa Senhora das Mercês (Church of Our Lady of Mercy), that was founded in AD 1630 by the Roiz family and the crown of the statue of our Lady has their family initials. The church was later modified in the eighteenth century which is located at the village square. The 1630 church construction was funded by the Roiz family, the Jesuits and the Gancars of Colluá.

The local people (now called: native Colvakars) brought to Colvá by their then ruling Lords and masters (called Bhatkars). These working class local people (called Mundkars lived on the land of their respected Bhatkars) have mainly been fisherfolk in majority since the mid-16th century. Other working class (curumbins, jornaleiros) were carpenters, massons, coconut pluckers (render/padekar), field/rice cultivation labourers, bakers (poder), etc... These included gentile converts as well as migrants from various Portuguese territories in the Indian subcontinent, overseas territories such as Angola, Mozambique, Brazil, etc. as well as Portugal itself that mixed and created the diversity of today.

== History ==
Colvá was under Portuguese administration, as the Province of Portuguese-Goa, from 1510 until 1961 (and was still under dispute and represented in the Parliament of Portugal till 1974/75). It was the village of the Portuguese Roiz family, the descendants of D. Diogo Rodrigues, and its villagers. The village had belonged, since 1550, to D. Diogo Rodrigues, who was the Lord of Colvá (Landlord of Colvá). He built the first Portuguese architecture residential house in 1551, facing away from the sea and at a distance from the shore to avoid any enemy attacks from the Arabian Sea. The entire beach, called Praia da Colvá, belonged to him.

In the 18th century, one of Diogo's descendants, Sebastião José Roiz, ordered the village people to plant coconut trees along the entire coastline, which the villagers thought was a waste of time as the soil was white and thus infertile and unable to sustain their growth. However today the shore line is fringed by those plantations of coconut trees. The entire Colvá shore and beach property as far as Betalbatim was inherited by various descendants of the Roiz family until the late 20th century, after which parts were handed over to the Government of Goa under the post-1974 Indian administration following the 1961 annexation of Goa by India. The rest of the land was sold.

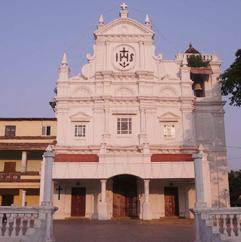
Igreja da Nossa Senhora das Mercês

Colvá is still famous for the whitewashed Our Lady Of Mercy church, originally known as Igreja de Nossa Senhora das Mercês, that was founded in 1630 and rebuilt in the eighteenth century in the village square. It houses the miraculous statue of Menino Jesus (Baby Jesus), which was introduced by a Jesuit missionary and which is believed to have healing powers. According to local legend, the statue at Our Lady of Mercy church was found in the mid-seventeenth century along the coast of Mozambique after Rev Fr. Bento Ferreira and his party had been shipwrecked off the coast. After swimming to safety, they spotted it as it was washed ashore after being dumped into the sea by Muslim pirates. In 1648 when Father Ferreira was posted to Colvá, he placed the statue on the altar, and it soon started drawing large crowds of devotees as it granted their favours. The Menino Jesus statue is kept for public viewing in October for the annual Fama ('Fame') festival for which thousands of people assemble. This is the only time that it is removed from the triple-vault locks of the church. It is then dipped into a nearby river after a procession, and the pilgrims use this water for anointment and good luck.

=== Aristocratic families of Colvá ===
The Feudal Lords and aristocratic families of Colvá that included Gandaulim, Vanelim, Sernabatim and limited part of Canã were: Roiz/Roiz dos Mártyres (Rodrigues), Friz (Fernandes), Mascarenhas, Aguiar, Santimano, Gracias, Costa, Vales, Texeira, Pacheco, Cunha, Cruz, Silva, Rebêlo. These families belonged to the parish church called Igreja Nossa Senhora das Mercês de Colvá and had allegiance to the Portuguese Empire. The church was built in 1630 and affiliated to the parish of Benaulim until 1635. From 1581 to 1635, these aforementioned illustrious, elite and noble families and all their subjects (mundkars) in Colvá belonged to Igreja de São João Baptista.

== Demographics and geography ==
=== Location ===
Colvá has an average elevation of 1.1 metres (3.6 ft). Its main village market is located behind the church, which is about 2.3 km (1.4 mi) away from the beach; there are various other shops at the cross road near the beach. Colvá recognises three beaches; firstly the main Colvá beach which is the prime beach, secondly Sunset beach (towards Betalbatim) which is less congested, and thirdly Baywatch beach (towards Benaulim at Sernabatim).

=== Colva Beach ===
Colvá Beach
- Beach
- Interactive map of Colvá Beach

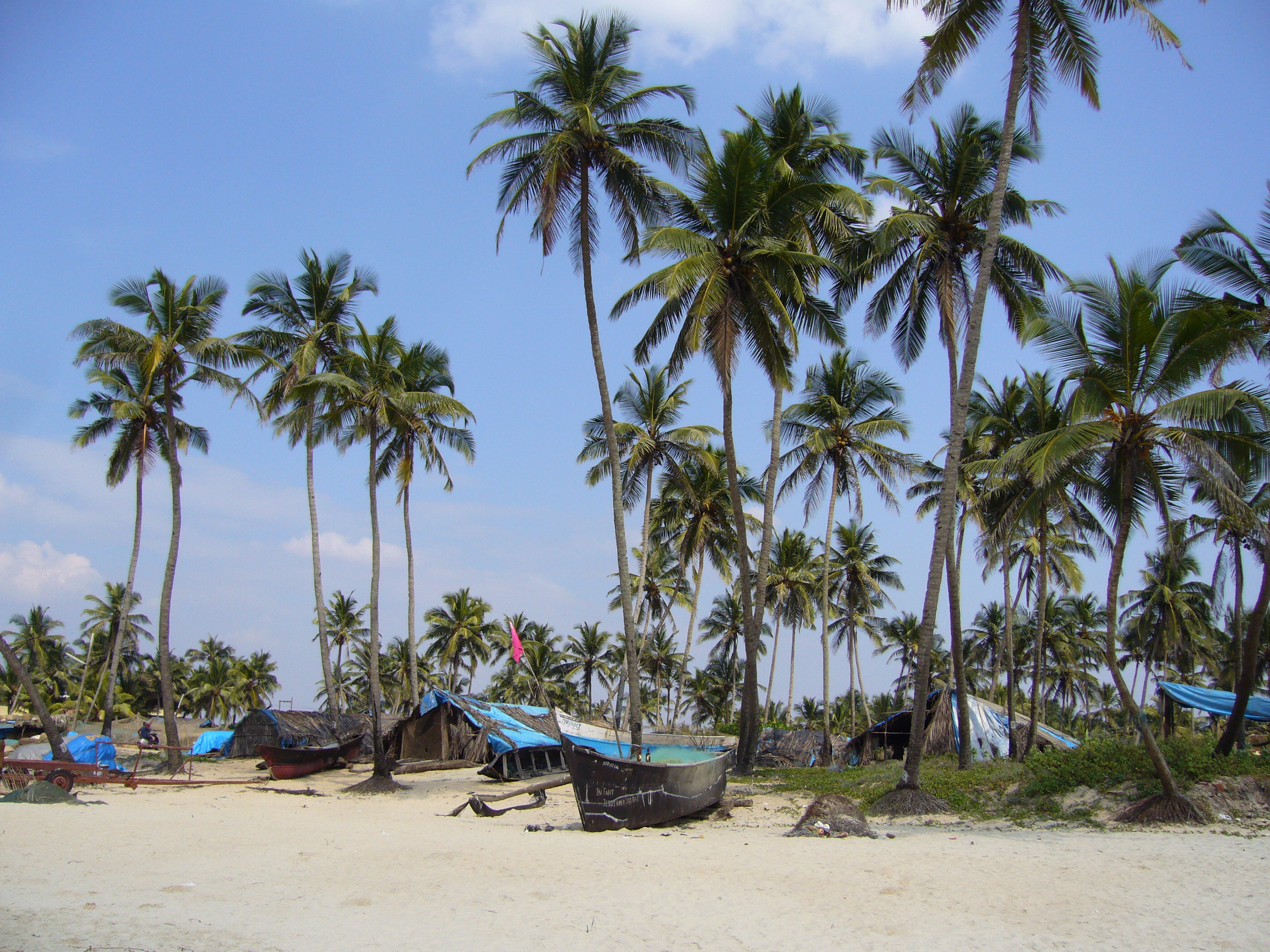
Colvá Beach with local fishing boats

Colvá beach stretches for around 2.4 km, part of a beach consisting of about 25 km of powder white sand, lined along its shore by coconut palms, and extending as far as Bogmalo Beach to the north and Cabo de rama Beach to the South Goa's coastline. Colva is now a famous tourist destination, enjoyed for its beach. The tourist industry is well developed with many budget hotels, guest houses, beach shacks, food stalls, small restaurants and pubs and bars, although these developments have not extended in any large degree to the nightlife.

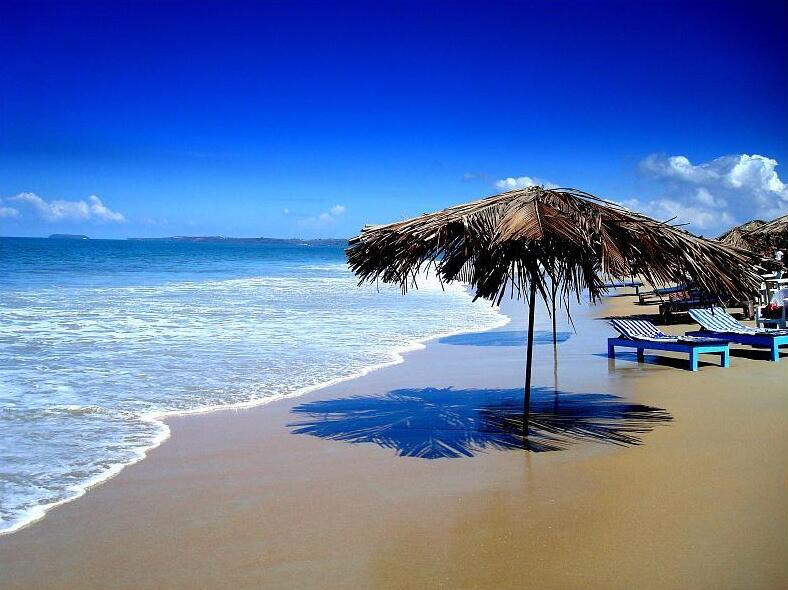
Colvá Beach for a swim

The beaches are constantly monitored by lifeguards and the swimming areas flagged with coloured flags accordingly. Being one of the famous beaches of Goa, this beach is highly crowded most of the time of the year. With a majority of its visitors being domestic Indian visitors this beach is mostly neglected by foreigners.

== Travel ==
The nearest airport is Dabolim Airport which is about 28 km away. The nearest railway station is Madgoan junction railway station, 20 minutes' drive away. Colva beach can be reached from Margao by bus. Private transport is also available. Colvá is 8 km (5.0 mi) from Margao and 40 km (25 mi) from Panajim. The closest railway station is in Margao followed by Vasco da Gama, Goa. The airport is Dabolim Airport (GOI) at Vasco da Gama, Goa. The neighbouring villages are Betalbatim and Benaulim and the nearest city is Margao.

Distances around Goa (from and to Colva):

- Margao - 8 km (5.0 mi),
- Vasco - 35 km (22 mi),
- Mapusa - 53 km (33 mi),
- Calangute - 56 km (35 mi),
- Ponda - 28 km (17 mi),
- Dabolim Airport - 28 km (17 mi),
- Panjim - 40 km (25 mi),
- Tiracol - 82 km (51 mi).

=== Climate ===
Colvá features a tropical monsoon climate under the Köppen climate classification. Colvá, being in the tropical zone and near the Arabian Sea, has a hot and humid climate for most of the year. The month of May is the hottest, seeing day temperatures of over 35 °C (95 °F) coupled with high humidity. The monsoon rains arrive by early June and provide a much-needed respite from the heat. Most of Colvá's annual rainfall is received through the monsoons which last till late September.

Colvá has a short winter season between mid-December and February. These months are marked by nights of around 21 °C (70 °F) and days of around 28 °C (82 °F), with moderate amounts of humidity.

Climate data for Colvá
Month	Jan	Feb	Mar	Apr	May	Jun	Jul	Aug	Sep	Oct	Nov	Dec	Year
Mean daily maximum °C (°F)	31.6 (88.9)	31.5 (88.7)	32.0 (89.6)	33.0 (91.4)	33.0 (91.4)	30.3 (86.5)	28.9 (84.0)	28.8 (83.8)	29.5 (85.1)	31.6 (88.9)	32.8 (91.0)	32.4 (90.3)	31.3 (88.3)
Daily mean °C (°F)	25.6 (78.1)	26.0 (78.8)	27.6 (81.7)	29.3 (84.7)	29.7 (85.5)	27.5 (81.5)	26.5 (79.7)	26.4 (79.5)	26.7 (80.1)	27.7 (81.9)	27.6 (81.7)	26.5 (79.7)	27.3 (81.1)
Mean daily minimum °C (°F)	19.6 (67.3)	20.5 (68.9)	23.2 (73.8)	25.6 (78.1)	26.3 (79.3)	24.7 (76.5)	24.1 (75.4)	24.0 (75.2)	23.8 (74.8)	23.8 (74.8)	22.3 (72.1)	20.6 (69.1)	23.2 (73.8)
Average precipitation mm (inches)	0.2 (0.01)	0.1 (0.00)	1.2 (0.05)	11.8 (0.46)	112.7 (4.44)	868.2 (34.18)	994.8 (39.17)	512.7 (20.19)	251.9 (9.92)	124.8 (4.91)	30.9 (1.22)	16.7 (0.66)	2,926 (115.2)
Average precipitation days	0.0	0.0	0.1	0.8	4.2	21.9	27.2	13.3	13.5	6.2	2.5	0.4	90.1
Mean monthly sunshine hours	313.1	301.6	291.4	288.0	297.6	126.0	105.4	120.9	177.0	248.0	273.0	300.7	2,842.7
Source: World Meteorological Organisation (UN)

== Culture ==
=== Languages ===
The Saxtti dialect of Konkani, belonging to the Indo-European family of languages, is the local language and spoken widely by the people of Colvá. Konkani (Concanim) is primarily written in the Latin script in Colvá. Portuguese is spoken by the elite, and older generations including the ones with Portuguese ancestry, i.e. these are the noble aristocratic descendants. English is spoken by all and is compulsorily taught in schools. Marathi, Hindi and Kannada are also recently widely understood and spoken throughout the locality post the year 1975 due to the large influx of various migrants from India and Nepal.

=== Religion ===
Religion in Colvá
1. Christianity (91.7%)
2. Hinduism (6.25%)
3. Islam (1.56%)
4. Others (0.51%)

Colvá is predominantly Roman Catholic. The main village church has various masses and novenas at various times of the year. The traditional feast called Fama is celebrated on the 2nd Monday of October every year, and pilgrims from around the world take part. The traditions of saibin or Mother of Jesus visiting each one's home is still continued.

=== Food and beverages ===
Colvakars, or people from Colvá, love fish and seafood. The cuisine is influenced by various influences, origins and four hundred years of Portuguese governance and recently a blend of modern techniques. The locals enjoy rice with fish curry (xitt kodi in Konkani), which is the staple diet in Goa. Colvá cuisine is famous for its rich variety of fish dishes cooked with elaborate recipes. Coconut and coconut oil are widely used in cooking along with chili peppers, spices and vinegar, giving the food a unique flavour. Various seafood delicacies include kingfish (visvonn, the most common delicacy), pomfret, shark, tuna and mackerel. Among the shellfish are crabs, prawns, tiger prawns, lobster, squid and mussels. Colvá food has pork dishes such as vindaloo, chouriço and sorpotel. Beef dishes and chicken xacuti are cooked for major occasions amongst the Catholics. Sannas are relished. A rich egg-based, multi-layered sweet dish known as bebinca is a favourite at Christmas. Rissóis de camarão, beef croquettes, fried mussels and semolina prawns are favourite starters.

The most popular alcoholic beverage in Goa and enjoyed in Colvá is feni. Cashew feni is made from the fermentation of the fruit of the cashew tree, while coconut feni is made from the sap of toddy palms. The people also drink wine, especially on feast days.

== Subdivisions & Government ==
Panchayat: The office of the village panchayat of Colva administers the area covering Colva, Sernabatim, Vanelim & Gandaulim.

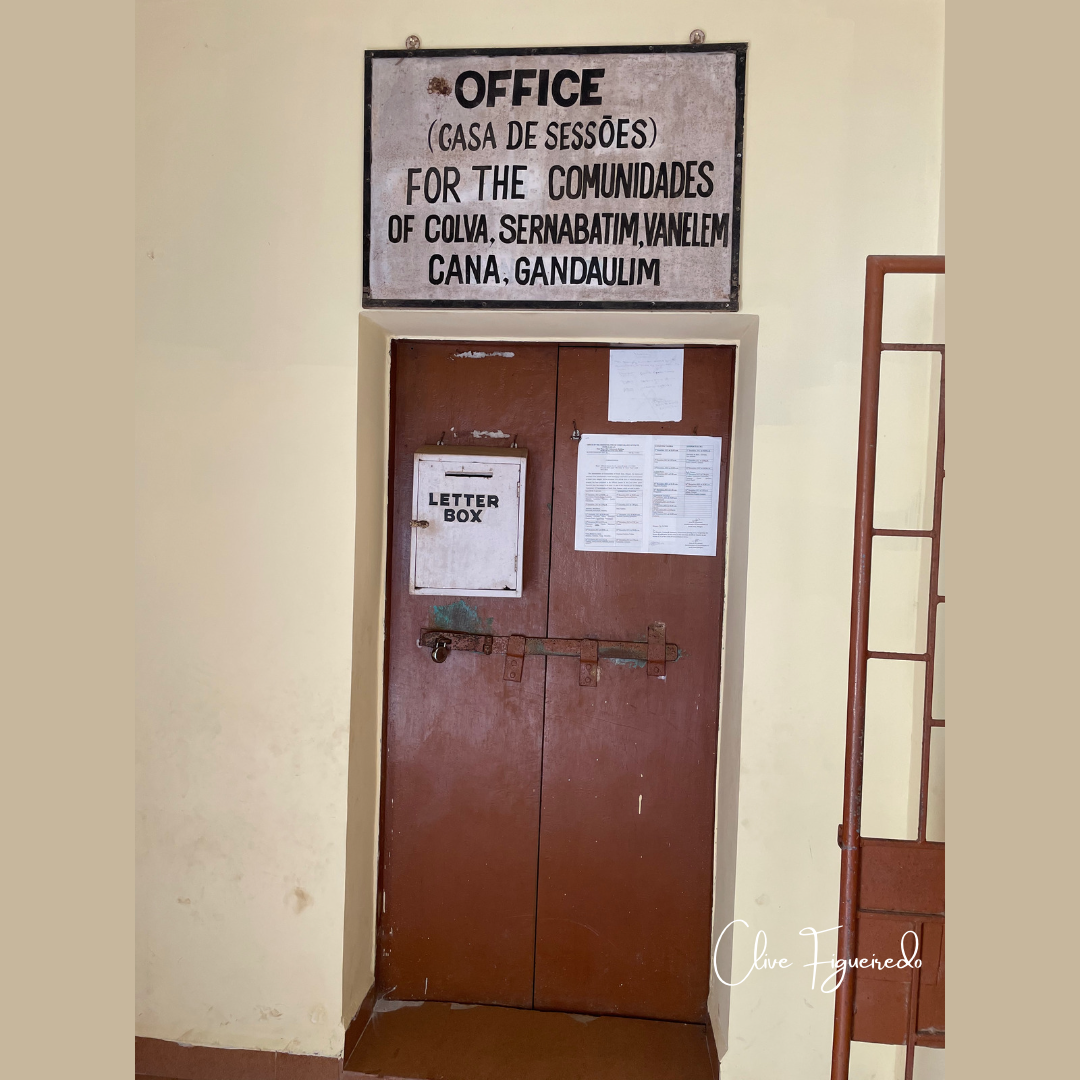
Office of the Comunidade de Colvá

The areas are then uniquely identified by wards or bairros such as Bairro 1 (1st ward), Bairro 2 (2nd ward), Bairro 3 (3rd ward), Bairro 4 (4th ward).

Comunidades: The office or Casa de Sessōes for the comunidades of Colva, Sernabatim, Vanelim, Canã and Gandaulim are located in the premises of Our Lady of Mercy Church (Igreja de Nossa Senhora das Mercês) in Colva. Prior to this (current) office space allocation, the sessions were held at the ancestral homes of the Gancars of Colvá.

Police station: The Colva police station has a jurisdiction covering the entire coastal belt of Salcete from Majorda to Cavelossim and operates from a rented home.

== Gallery ==
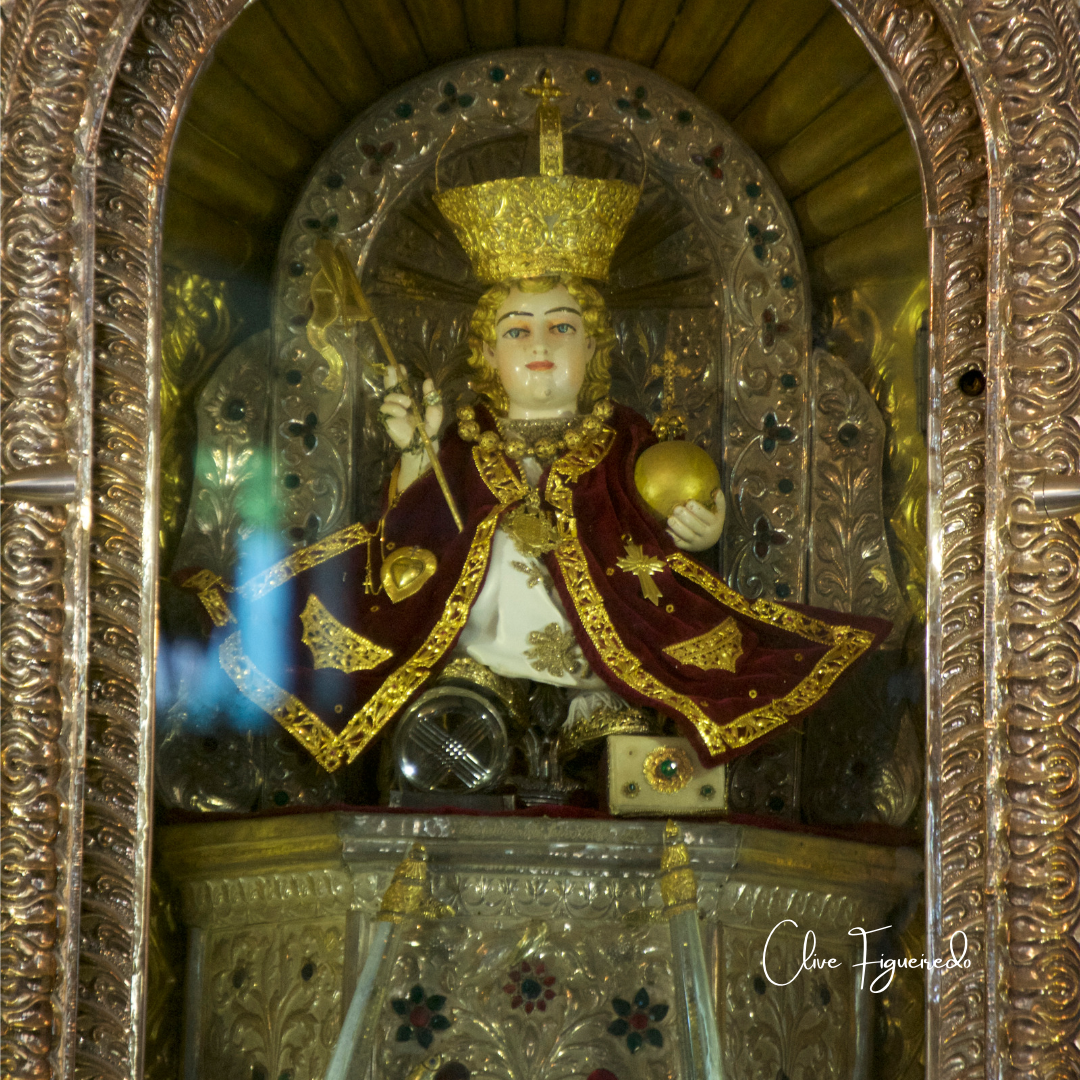
Statue of Menino Jesus at Our Lady of Merces Church, Colvá

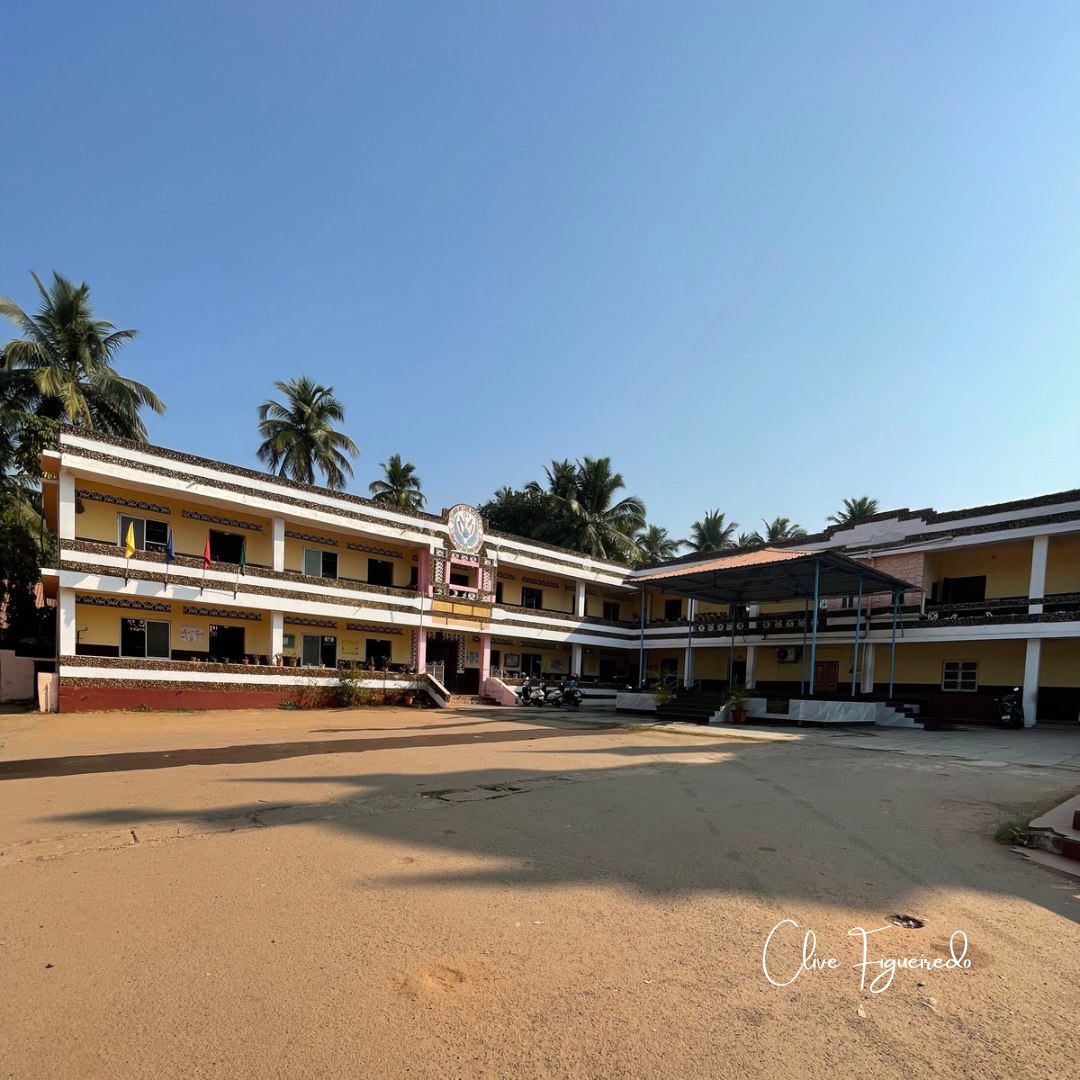
Infant Jesus High School Colvá, Built 1962

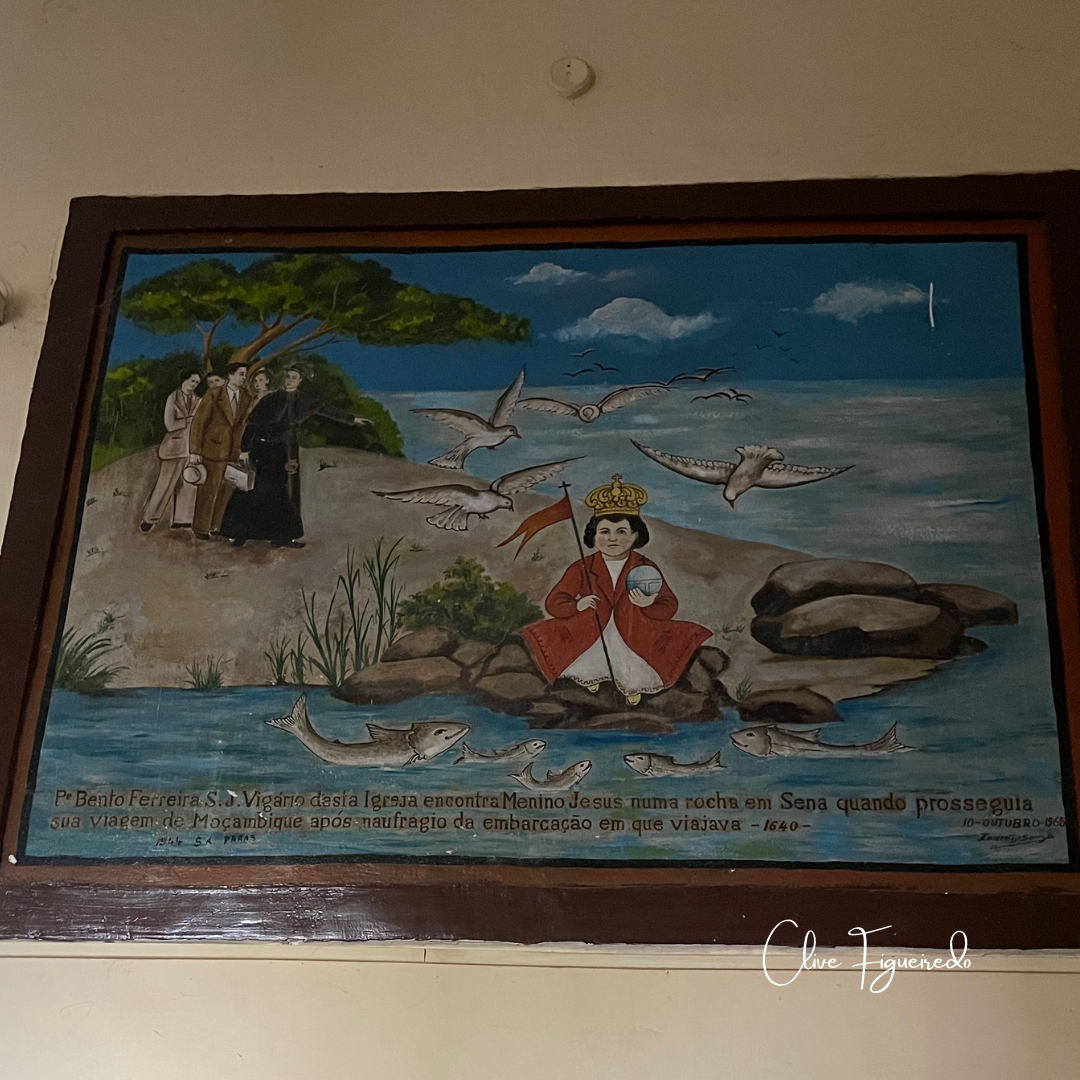
Mural of the legend of Menino Jesus

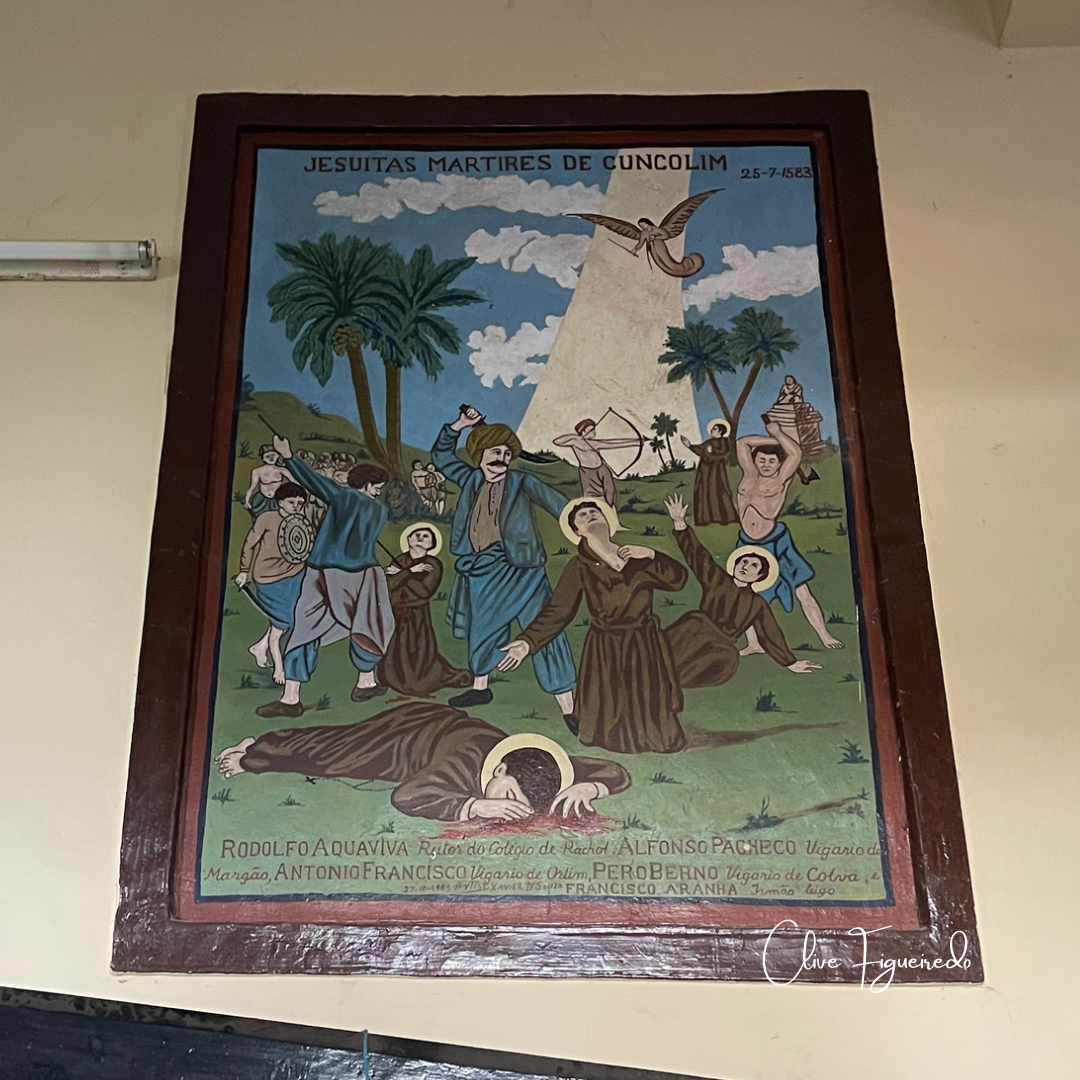
Mural of the Jesuit Martyrs of Cuncolim 1583

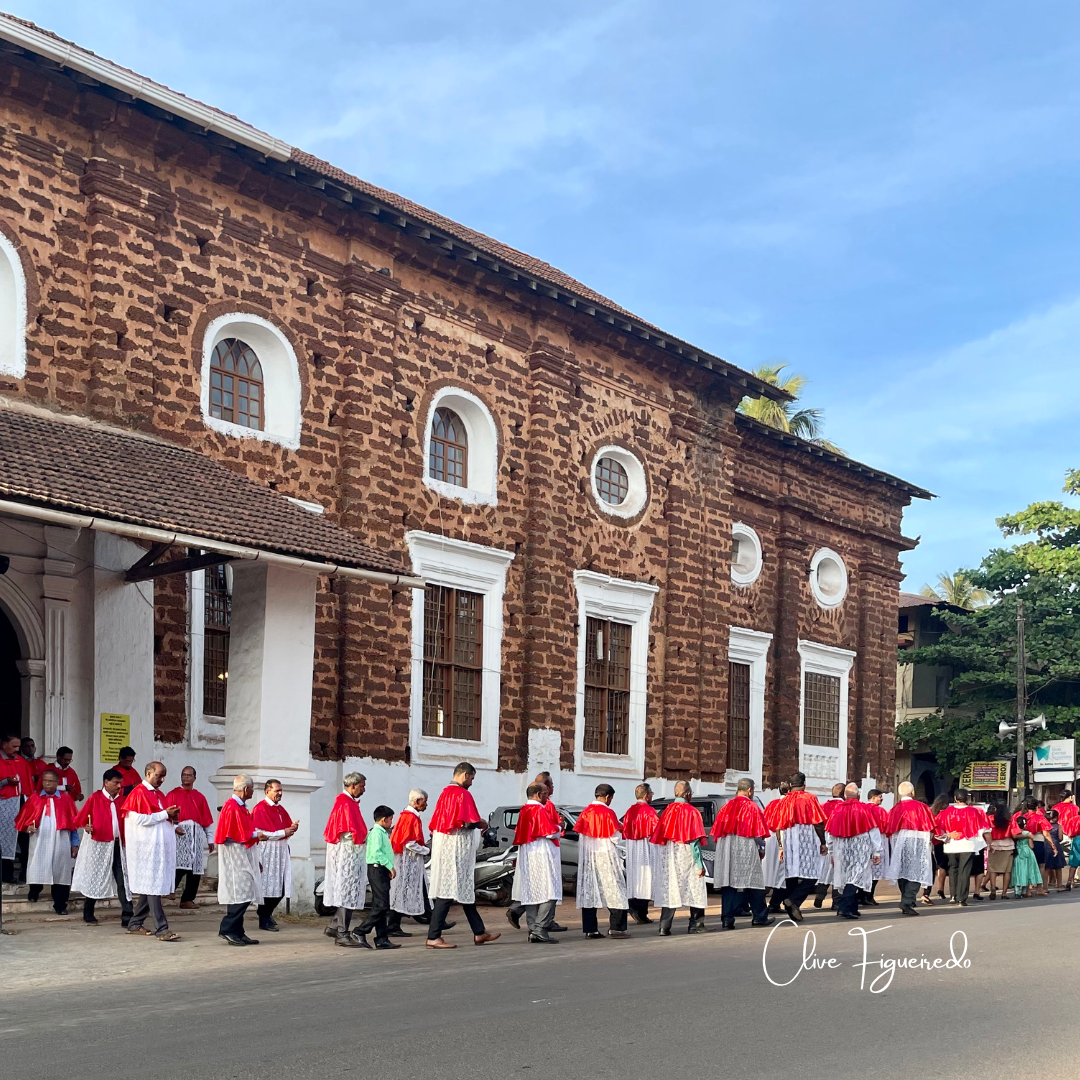
Members of the Confraria in Easter Procession

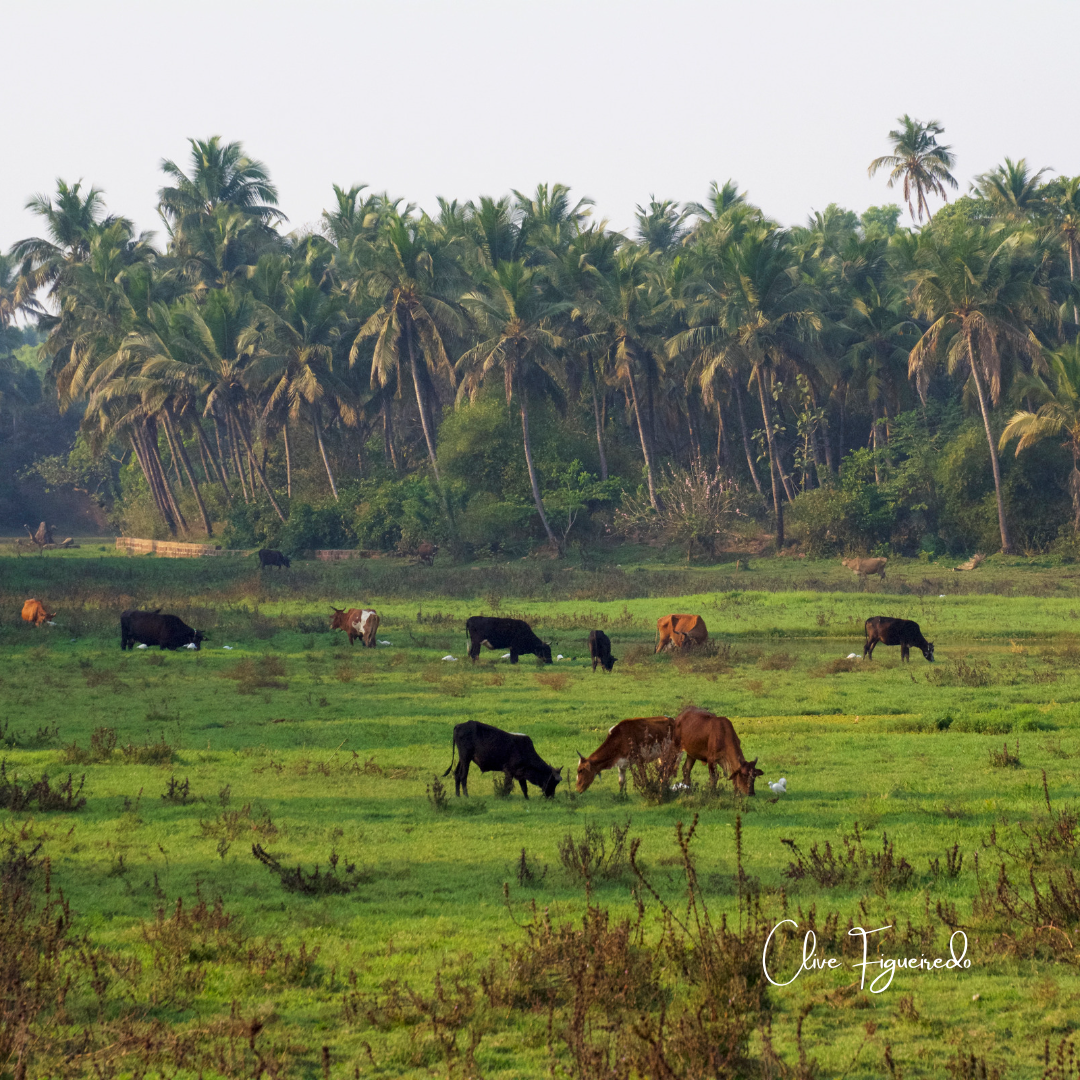
Cows grazing in the fields of Colvá

== See also ==
- Diogo Rodrigues
