= Rachol =

- Village
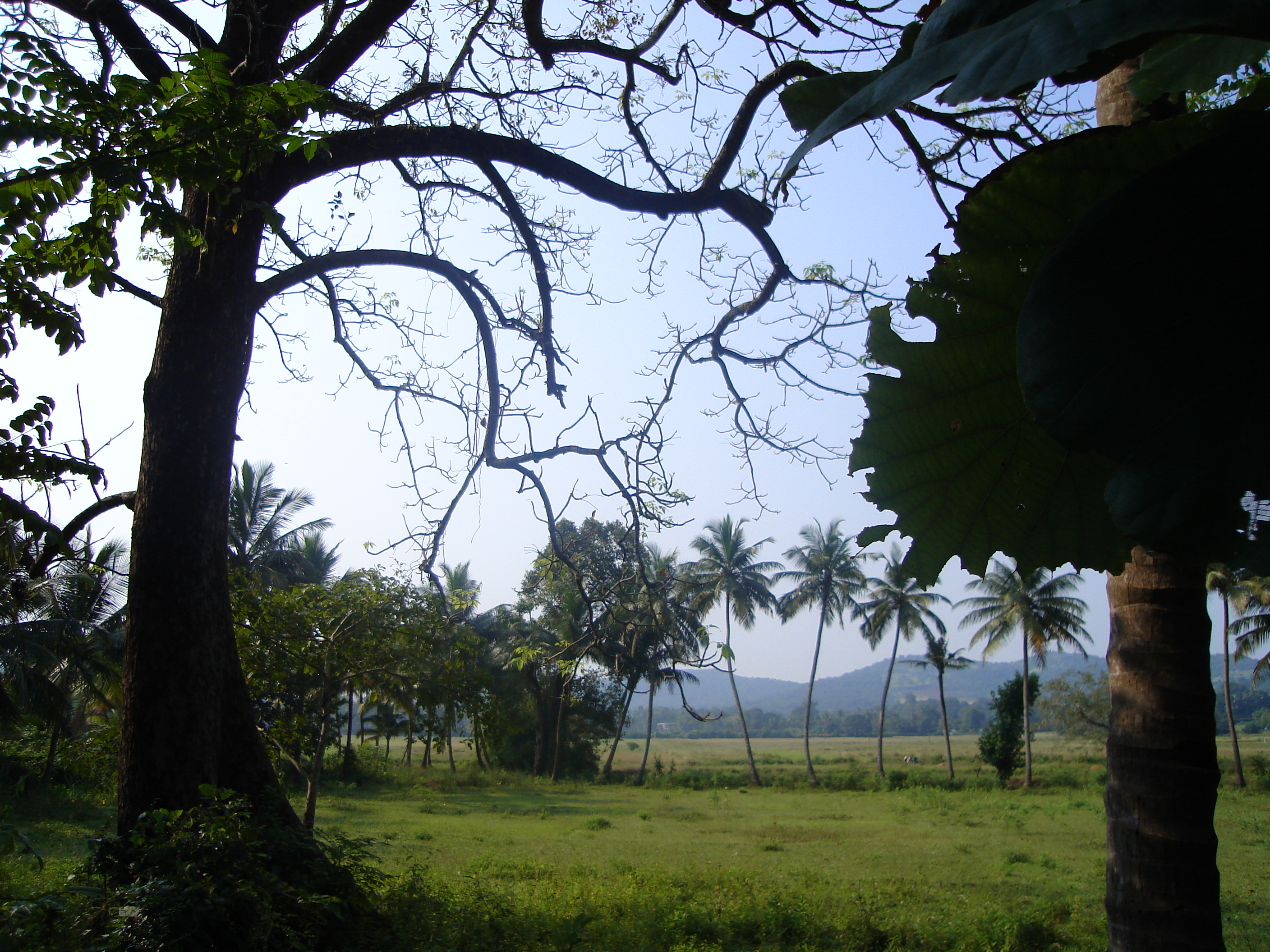

- Site of Rachol in Goa, west India Rachol (India)
- Coordinates: 15°18′29″N 74°00′19″E
- Country: India
- State: Goa
- District: South Goa
- Sub-district: Salcete
- Time zone: UTC+5:30 (IST)
- Postcode: 403719
- Area code: 0832

Rachol (also known as Raitura) is a prominent village in the Salcete taluka (subdistrict) of South Goa district, Goa state, peninsular India. It is located on the left bank of the Zuari River and is home to the famous Rachol Seminary. The famous Portuguese colonial Rachol Fort has been completely erased, leaving behind the traces of the moat and the main gate. The village has many heritage structures and is an important site to study the history of Salcete. The Church of Our Lady of Snows (Igreja da Nossa Senhora de Neves) at Rachol is said to be the first church of Salcete and is called the Matriz igreja de Salcette ('Mother church of Salcette'). Ilha de Rachol ('Island of Rachol') is a part of the village.

== Etymology and history ==
By the late 1400s, Rachol was part of a Muslim area, ruled primarily by a Muslim kingdom known as Bahmani Sultanate and the Sultan of Bijapur under Ismail Adil Shah. The rulers of Vijayanagar and Bijapur fought long battles to take control of this place. It was only in 1520 that the Hindus under King Krishnadevaraya, also known as Krishnaraya, from the Vijayanagar Empire with help of the Portuguese took complete control of Rachol. Due to Jesuits being attacked in the late 1560s, a decree on December 1565, forbidding the erection of new temples and the repairs of the existing ones, was issued by the viceroy António de Noronha (1564–1568). This led to the mass exodus of Hindu Brahmins from the Portuguese-held territories that included Rachol and these Brahmins taking the idols of their deities across the Zuari River from Rachol to the territories of the Hindu Sonde Kings such as Shiroda, Ponda and Sanguem.

== Geography and Demographics ==
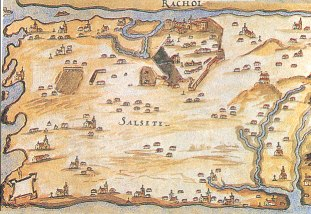
Salcete and ilha de Rachol in an old Portuguese map

=== Location ===
Rachol is located 8 kilometres (5.0 mi) north-east of Margão, the headquarters of South Goa district. Opposite Rachol, across the Zuari River, is Shiroda. The closest railway station is in Margão, followed by the town of Vasco da Gama, Goa. The nearest airport is Dabolim Airport. The neighbouring villages are Raia, Loutolim, and Fatorda.

=== Languages ===
The Saxtti dialect of Konkani, belonging to the Indo-European family of languages, is the local language and spoken widely by all Rachol people. Portuguese is spoken by the elite and older generations, including the ones with Portuguese ancestry. English is spoken by all and is compulsorily taught in schools. Hindi is spoken by migrants after the Invasion of Goa and is spreading in all regions of Goa. Konkani, also spelt 'Concani', is primarily written in the Latin script in Rachol.

== Landmarks ==
=== Matriz Church ===
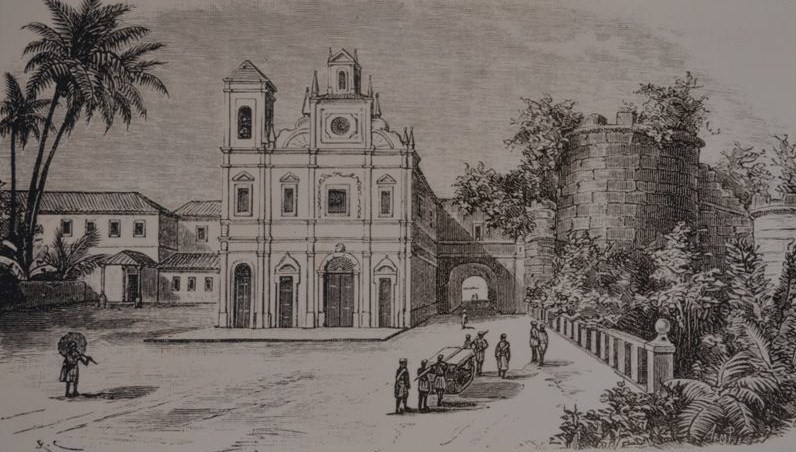
Igreja da Nossa Senhora de Neves and the Rachol Fort

The parochial church was dedicated to Nossa Senhora de Neves (Our Lady of Snows). It was built alongside the fortress of Rachol. This church was considered as the first in dignity of Salcete (known as ilha de Salcete do Sul at that time). As this first church at Rachol and hence Salcete was built to completion in the year 1565, on the site of Hindu temples and was built in mud with a thatched roof, it can thus be called the mother church (Matriz) of the whole of South Goa and was named Igreja da Nossa Senhora de Neves. It was the first Archbishop of Goa, Dom Gaspar Jorge de Leão Pereira, who personally visited Margão and the surrounding areas to choose the location. After seeing all other places, he guarded an arrow into this ground at Rachol and ordered to build the church there; the Captain of Rachol Fortress (Capitão desta Fortaleza de Rachol) Diogo Rodrigues was appointed to do the needful.

There have been two historical burials in the church at the altar: the first was the captain of the Fort (Capitão desta Fortaleza) Diogo Rodrigues in 1577; the second in 1583 being the martyrs of Cuncolim which is called the Cuncolim Revolt as there was a massacre on Jesuit priests and civilians in Cuncolim, Goa on Monday, 25 July 1583. The martyrs' bodies remained there until 1597, after which they were shifted to Saint Paul's College, Goa. All the martyrs' bodies were finally shifted and laid to rest in Old Goa at the cathedral in 1862.

=== Rachol Fort ===
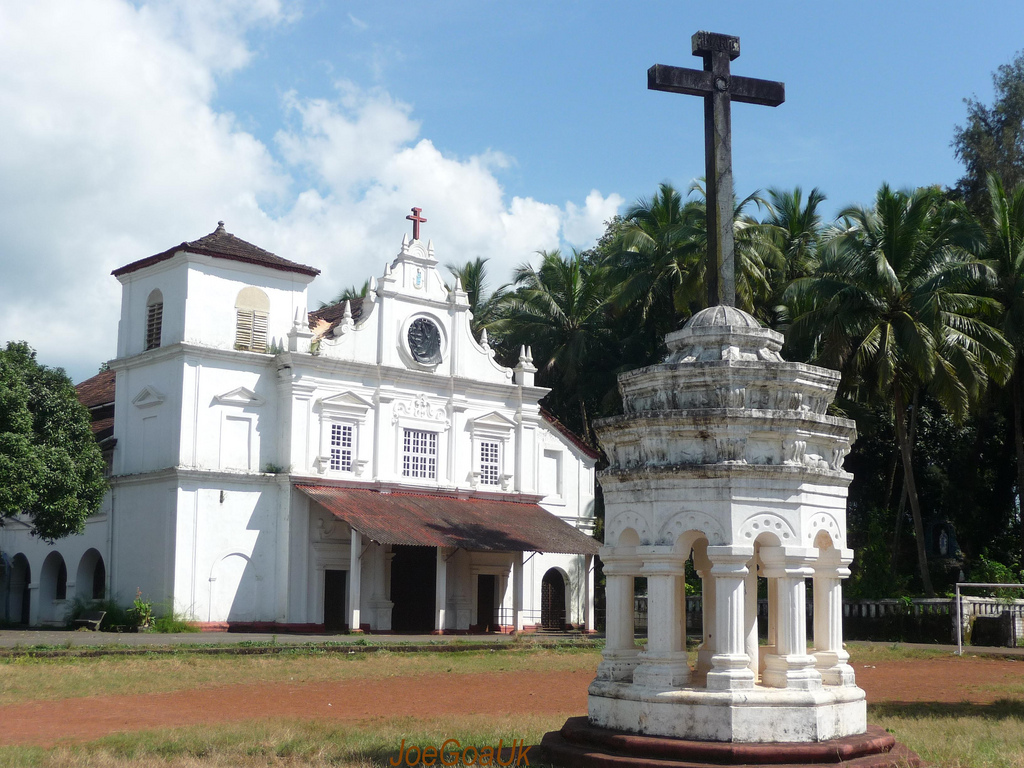
Igreja da Nossa Senhora de Neves and the ruins of the Rachol Fort

Rachol Fort is not far from the Rachol Seminary. About 7 km (4.3 mi) away from the town of Margão, once stood the wonderful Rachol Fort. The place has not much of an architectural delight, but the scenic beauty of the place is very pleasing. The fort was refurbished after the conquest by the Portuguese. The bastion is now a deserted place in ruins, but only one gateway remains even to these days. When the fort was in use by the Portuguese troops, it encircled the hill atop which the church and seminary now stands. Rachol Fort was the center of many conflicts, and the rulers of Vijayanagar and Bijapur fought long and bloody battles to take control of the fort. The dried-up moat can still be seen in places. The Muslim Bahmani kingdom built the fortress at the height of its power. However, the Hindu Vijayanagar kingdom under King Krishnaraya, captured it from the Sultan of Bijapur under Ismail Adil Shah, only to cede it to the Portuguese in 1520 in exchange for all the military help against the Muslims and in gratitude for the former's alliance with him against Adil Shah of Bijapur. By 1521 there was in the fort a chapel dedicated to St. John the Baptist, with a garrison chaplain who was probably a Dominican. A church was built in 1565, and the captain of the Fort was Diogo Rodrigues from 1554 to 1577. It was renovated and rebuilt in 1604, and the fort continued to remain in Portuguese possession over the years, defending the area against Muslim and Hindu attackers, including a siege by the Maratha ruler Sambhaji in 1684, a feat that is marked by the following: Sendo o conde de Alvor vice-rei da India mandou reformar esta fortaleza depois de se defender do cerco de Sambagy, em 22 de abril de 1684 (in English: "Sent from the count of Alvor viceroy of India after reform of this fortress on defending the siege of Sambhaji, on 22 April 1684").

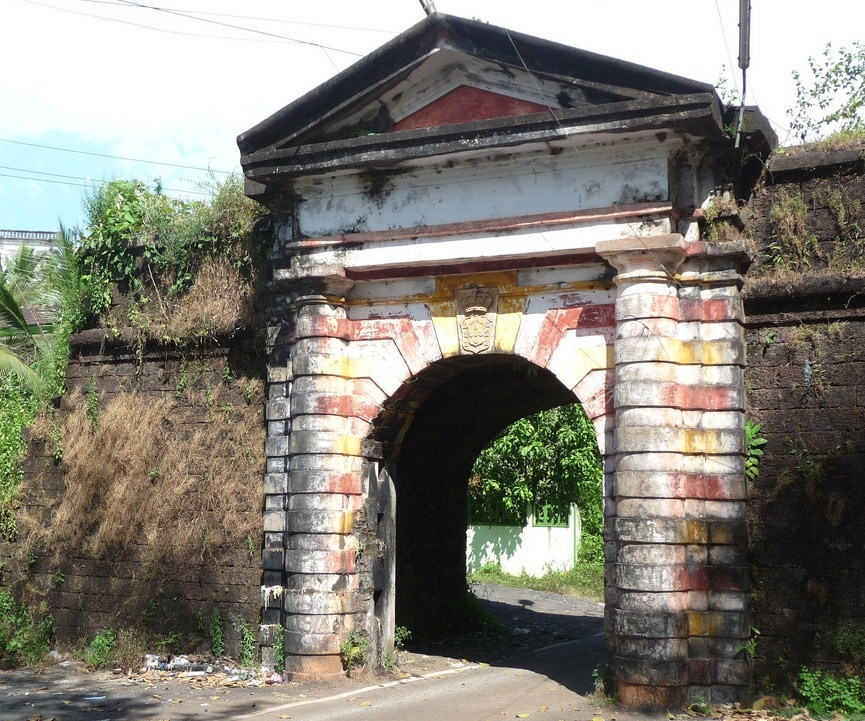
Rachol Fort gate renovated in 1756

It was renovated again in 1745 and 1756 by the Marquis of Alorna. At the peak of its power, it had as many as 100 guns on its ramparts, helping it to hold the Maratha armies at bay for months. As the Portuguese empire in Goa expanded with the New Conquests, the guns found new areas of deployment, and the fort fell from favour and was finally abandoned. The fort soon fell into a state of disrepair, and nothing remains of it today except the stone archway which spans the road and the old moat around the hill. With Portuguese expansion, concern for territorial security became even more of a concern, and new forts in new strategic locations were built. Deployment of guns elsewhere and reduction of strategic importance of the fort became a cause for its decay. After the Portuguese abandoned the fort, the rate of decay accelerated, and today it is no more than a ruin of the once glorious fort.

=== Rachol Seminary ===
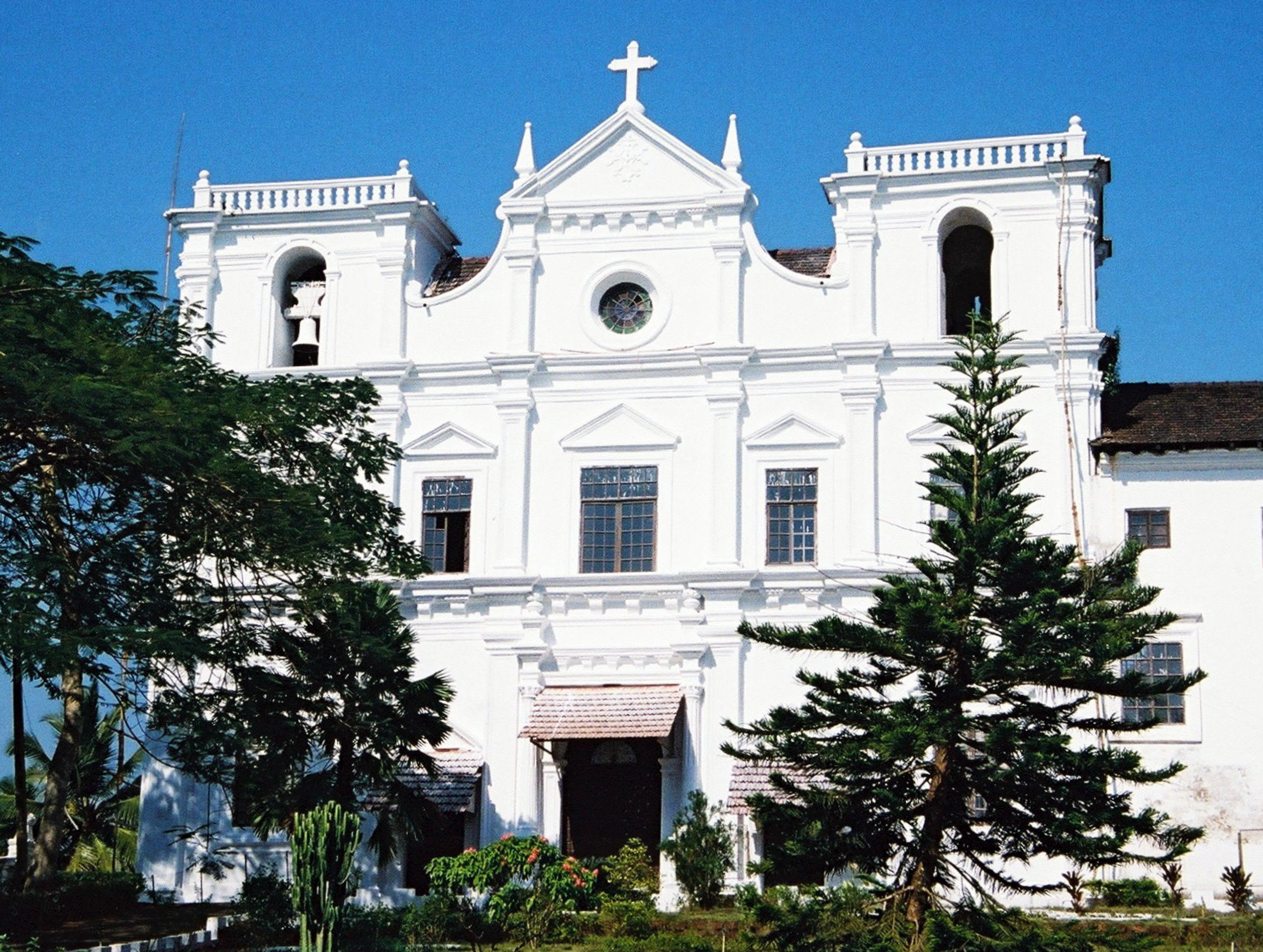
Seminário de Rachol

The Rachol Seminary, also known today as the Patriarchal Seminary of Rachol, Raiturchi Patriarkal Siminar in Konkani, and Seminário de Rachol in Portuguese, is the diocesan major seminary of the Roman Catholic Archdiocese of Goa and Daman. The edifice that presently houses the seminary was constructed by the Jesuits with donations from the king of Portugal, Dom Sebastião. This was constructed in the area previously occupied by strong dominance of Muslims and originally had a Muslim-built fortress. The foundation stone for the main quadrangular portion was blessed and laid on 1 November 1606 by Fr. Gaspar Soares. Three years later, on 31 October 1609, with the solemn celebration of the Vespers, the "College of All Saints" (Colégio de Todos os Santos) was blessed and inaugurated. Somewhere between 1622 and 1640, the name of the College was changed to "College of St. Ignatius" (Colégio de S. Inácio). The change was to pay homage to St. Ignatius of Loyola, the founder of the Jesuit Order, who had been canonised in 1622. The retable of the main altar of the Seminary Church testifies to this fact. The Seminary community still celebrates the feast of St. Ignatius of Loyola, the titular of the Seminary Church, with a solemn high mass with Gregorian chant. This festivity is preceded by a novena of preparation for the locals around and a week-long retreat (spiritual exercises) for the seminarians.

The College continued to be in the hands of the Jesuits for a century and a half. Having begun as a school for the training of natives, it gradually adopted the curriculum for training Jesuits and later even secular priests from 1646. In 1759, the Prime Minister of Portugal, Marquis de Pombal expelled the Jesuits from Goa. Their institutions and properties were confiscated by the State. So, the College had to be shut down. Three years later, in 1762, Archbishop-Primate Dom António Taveira da Neiva Brum e Silveira, converted this abandoned College into the "Diocesan Seminary of the Good Shepherd" (Seminário do Bom Pastor) and placed it under the protection of the Infant Jesus. He entrusted to the native Oratorian Congregation of St. Philip Neri the work of priestly training. This was the first diocesan seminary erected in Asia, after the order passed by the Council of Trent (1563–1578) that all those desiring to dedicate themselves to the ecclesiastical ministry as diocesan (secular) clergy should pass through formation in a seminary. The retable of the altar of the internal Chapel of the seminary bears an inspiring picture of Jesus, the Good Shepherd. The Church, however, continued under the invocation of St. Ignatius of Loyola. In 1774, the ruling Royal Treasury Junta of Goa abruptly suppressed the seminary on the pretext that certain conditions were not being fulfilled, the real reason being that of economy.

In 1781, owing to a mass-petition by the people of Salcete and the Municipality of Margão, the Court of Portugal ordered the seminary to be restored. The Municipality of Salcete even financed the required repairs for the building. The College was thus reopened, and its management was entrusted to the Congregation of the Mission, popularly called Vincentians or Lazarists. At first, two Vincentian priests from the Convent of Rilhafolles, Portugal, were deputed at the instance of Queen Dona Maria I of Portugal. The seminary was also condecorated with the title of "Royal Seminary of Rachol" (Real Seminário de Rachol). Later, Vincentians from Italy also came to help in the administration of the seminary. These priests who came from Italy, brought with them the sacred relics and a vial containing the blood of a Roman saint and martyr, St. Constantius. These relics are venerated even today in the church of the seminary. The seminary functioned well till 1790, when it was closed down for three years, after the Vincentians left the seminary. In 1793, the Oratorians were again deputed to run the diocesan seminary. They continued their work for about forty-two years. In 1835 all religious institutes were extinguished in Portugal and in all its possessions. So from that year, the Seminary was run by the diocesan clergy and came to be simply known as Seminário de Rachol. In 1886, the Archbishop of Goa and Daman was bestowed the honorific title of Patriarch of the East Indies. Since then the seminary is known as the "Patriarchal Seminary of Rachol". The seminary has renaissance paintings of Portuguese Goan high clergy and some royals.

== Climate ==
Rachol features a tropical monsoon climate under the Köppen climate classification. Rachol, being in the tropical zone, has a hot and humid climate for most of the year. The month of May is the hottest, seeing daytime temperatures of over 33 °C (93 °F). The monsoon rains arrive by early June and provide a much needed respite from the heat. Most of Rachol's annual rainfall is received through the monsoons, which last till late September.

Rachol has a short winter season, between mid-December and February. These months are marked by nights of around 21 °C (68 °F) and days of around 28 °C (82 °F), with moderate amounts of humidity.

Climate data for Rachol
Month	Jan	Feb	Mar	Apr	May	Jun	Jul	Aug	Sep	Oct	Nov	Dec	Year
Mean daily maximum °C (°F)	31.6 (88.9)	31.5 (88.7)	32.0 (89.6)	33.0 (91.4)	33.0 (91.4)	30.3 (86.5)	28.9 (84.0)	28.8 (83.8)	29.5 (85.1)	31.6 (88.9)	32.8 (91.0)	32.4 (90.3)	31.3 (88.3)
Daily mean °C (°F)	25.6 (78.1)	26.0 (78.8)	27.6 (81.7)	29.3 (84.7)	29.7 (85.5)	27.5 (81.5)	26.5 (79.7)	26.4 (79.5)	26.7 (80.1)	27.7 (81.9)	27.6 (81.7)	26.5 (79.7)	27.3 (81.1)
Mean daily minimum °C (°F)	19.6 (67.3)	20.5 (68.9)	23.2 (73.8)	25.6 (78.1)	26.3 (79.3)	24.7 (76.5)	24.1 (75.4)	24.0 (75.2)	23.8 (74.8)	23.8 (74.8)	22.3 (72.1)	20.6 (69.1)	23.2 (73.8)
Average precipitation mm (inches)	0.2 (0.01)	0.1 (0.00)	1.2 (0.05)	11.8 (0.46)	112.7 (4.44)	868.2 (34.18)	994.8 (39.17)	512.7 (20.19)	251.9 (9.92)	124.8 (4.91)	30.9 (1.22)	16.7 (0.66)	2,926 (115.2)
Average precipitation days	0.0	0.0	0.1	0.8	4.2	21.9	27.2	13.3	13.5	6.2	2.5	0.4	90.1
Mean monthly sunshine hours	313.1	301.6	291.4	288.0	297.6	126.0	105.4	120.9	177.0	248.0	273.0	300.7	2,842.7
Source: World Meteorological Organisation (UN)

== Gallery ==
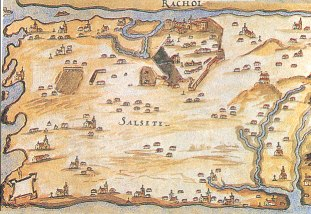
Centuries-old map of the area including nearby Rachol

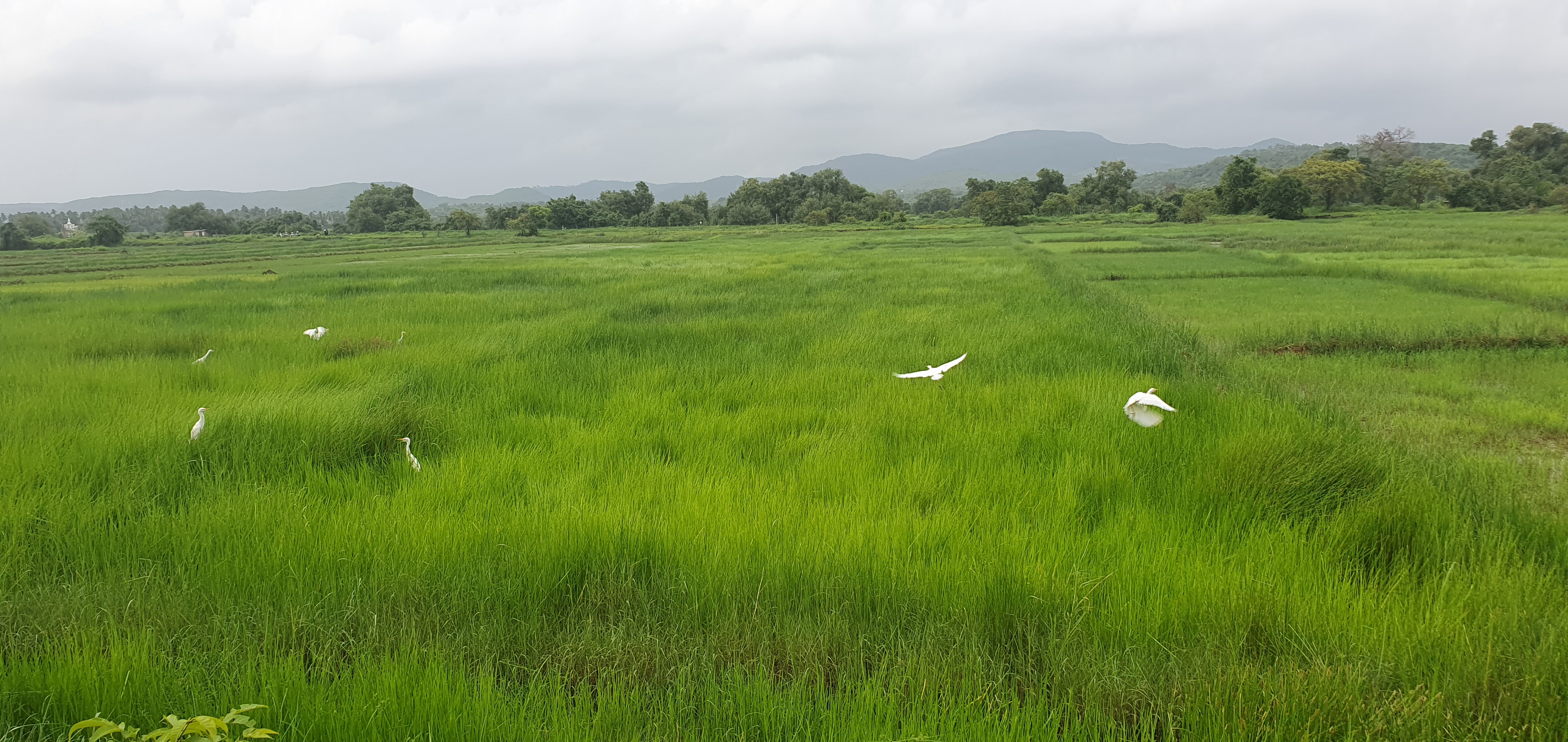
Fields at Rachol during the Rainy season

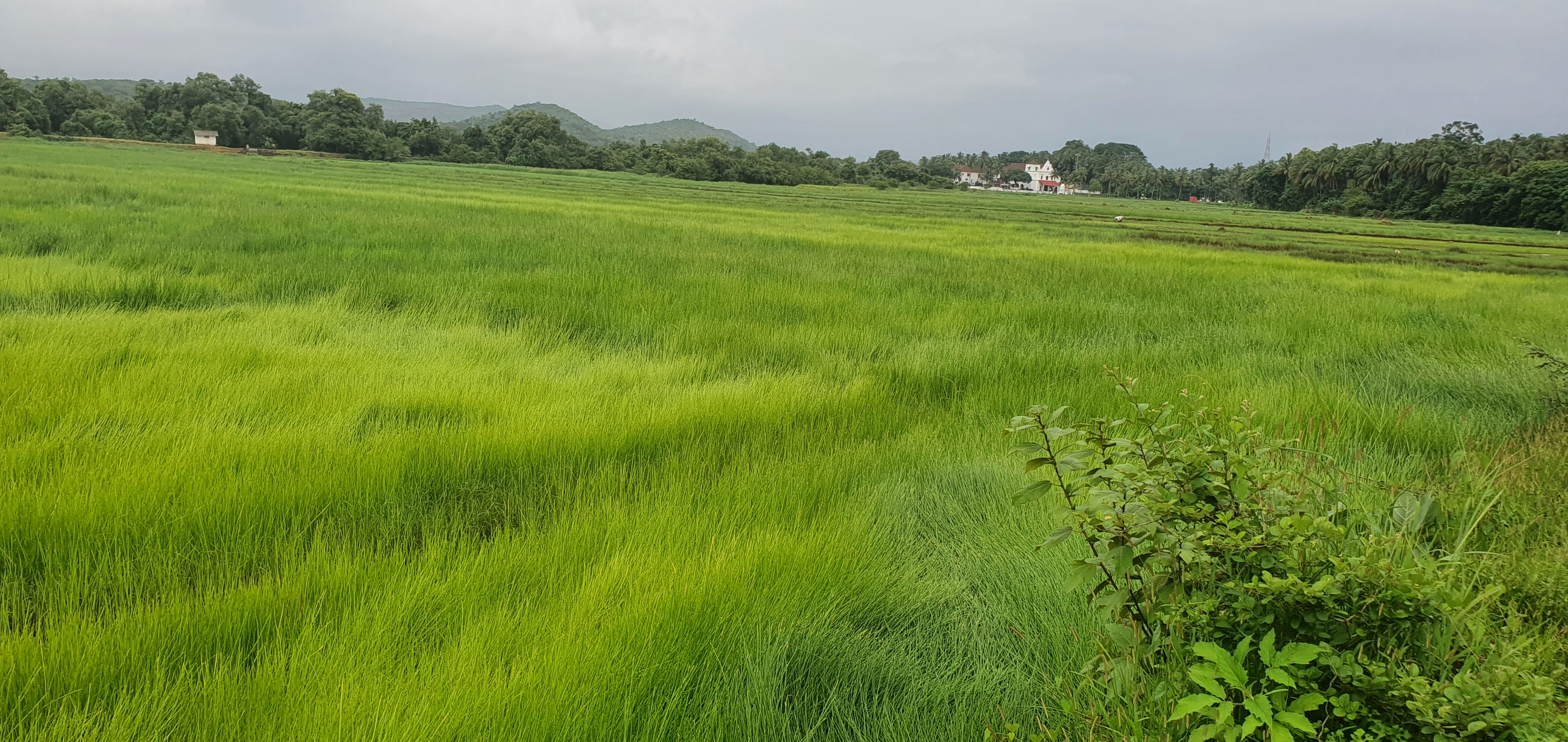
Fields at Rachol during the Rainy season

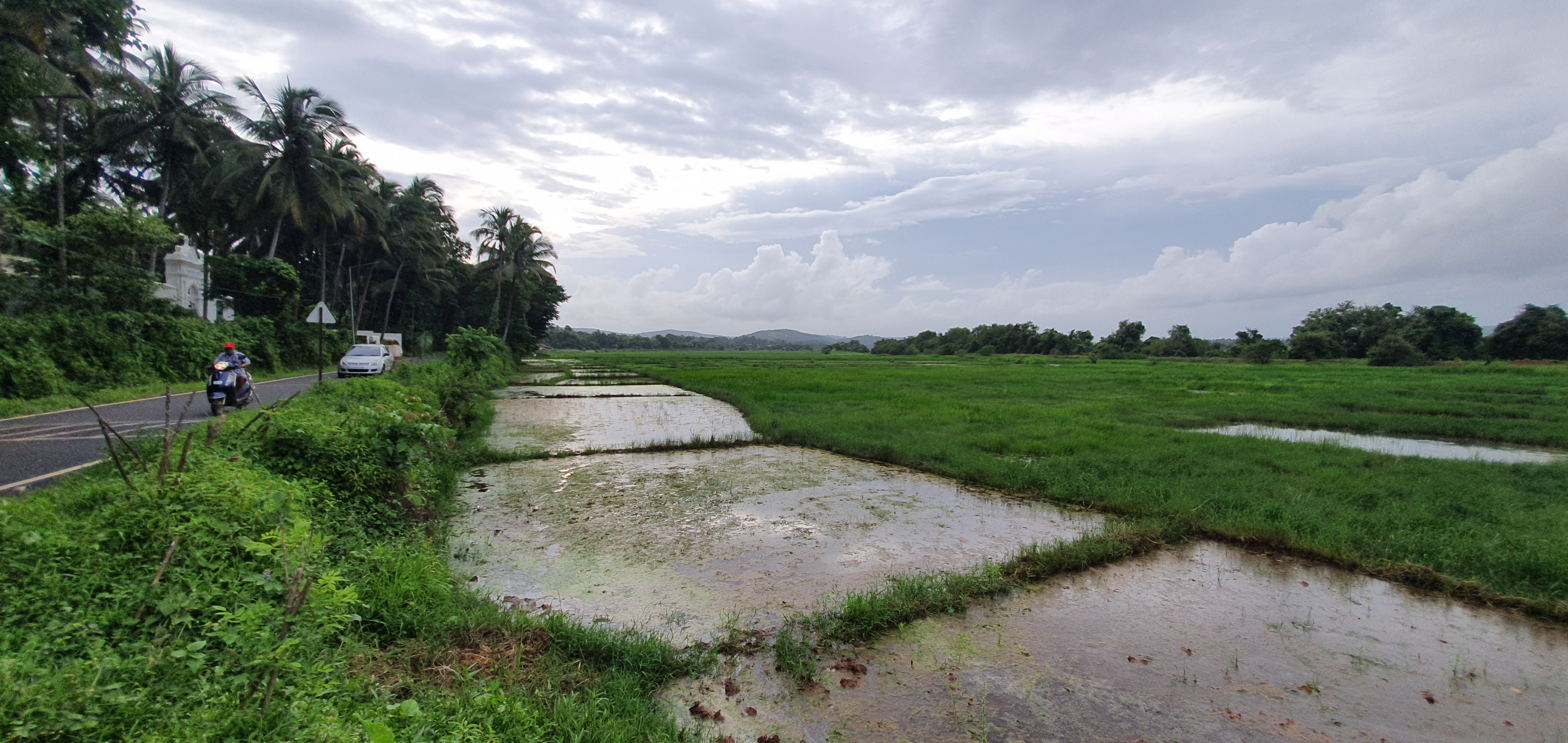
Fields at Rachol during the Rainy season
Images from Rachol, Goa, India
