= Bogmalo =

- Village
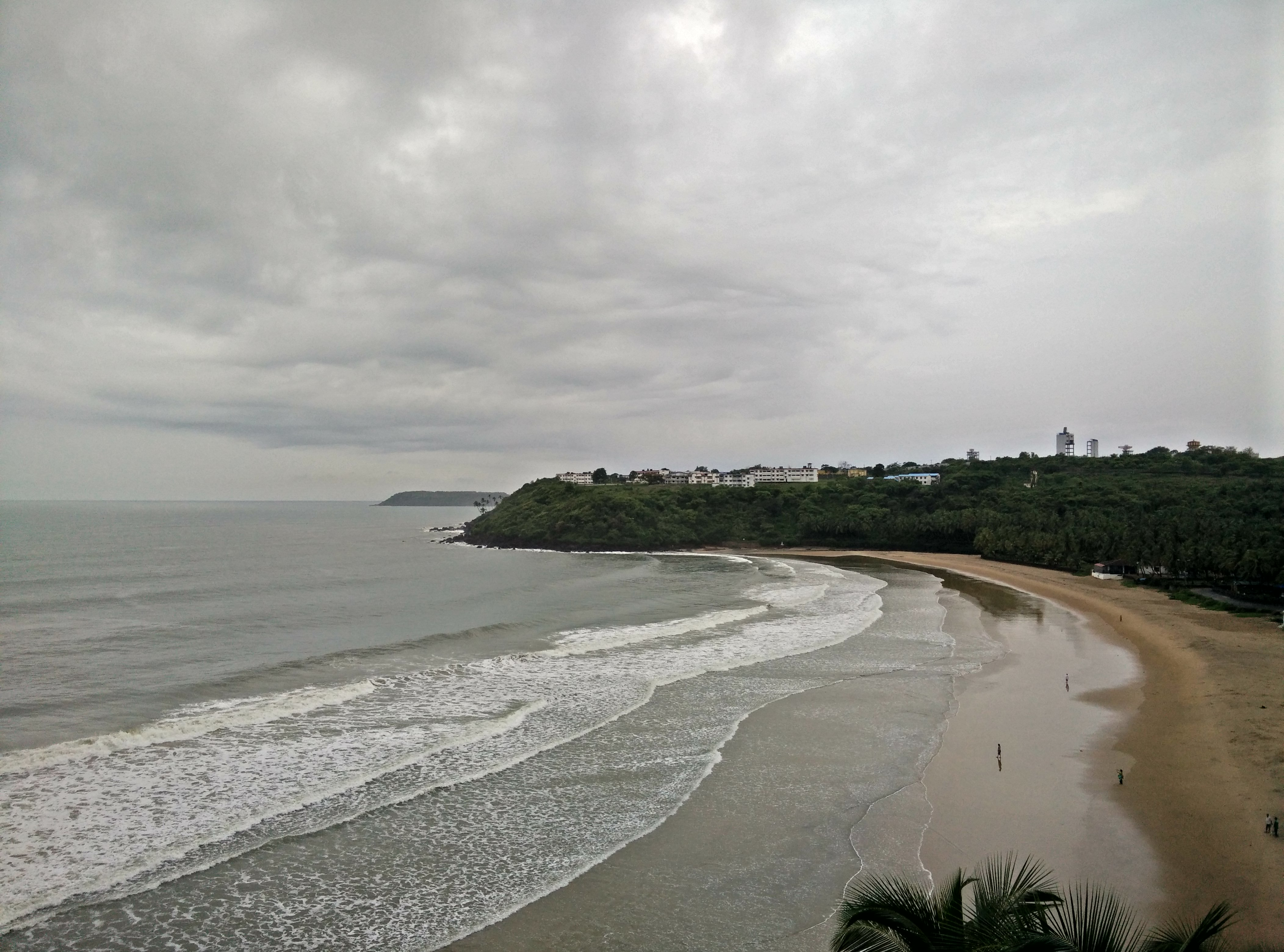
- Bogmalo Beach

- Location in Goa, India Bogmalo (India)
- Coordinates: 15°22′11″N 73°50′1″E
- Country: India
- State: Goa
- District: South Goa
- Time zone: UTC+5:30 (IST)
- Vehicle registration: GA
- Nearest city: Vasco da Gama

Bogmalo (pronounced [bɔːɡmaːɭɔː]) is a small beach-side village in Goa, India. It is situated in a small bay with around a mile of curving sandy beach.

The beach is located about 4 kilometres (2.5 mi) from Dabolim Airport and 9 kilometres (5.6 mi) from the port town of Vasco da Gama. It is known to host conferences for AIESEC India every June or July.

Areas of interest also include the Naval Aviation Museum (India), curated by the Indian Navy, which showcases the history of Naval Aviation with illustrations and installations including many de-commissioned aircraft used by the military since Independence.
