= Rachol Fort =

Historical Fort in Rachol, Goa

Coordinates: 15.309°N 74.001°E

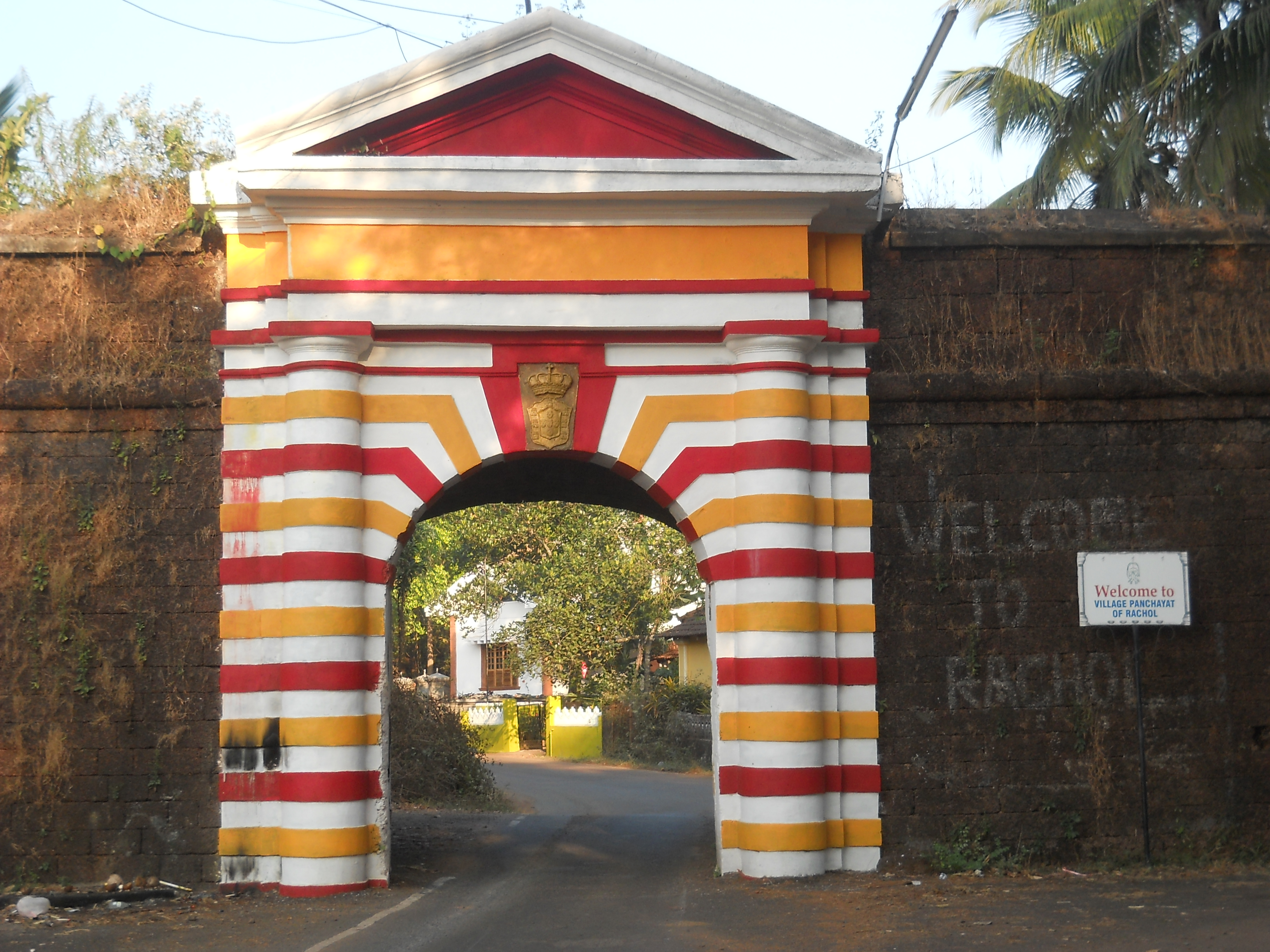
Arch of Rachol Fort

The Rachol Fort is a historical Portuguese era fort located in the village of Rachol, Salcette concelho, in the state of Goa on the west coast of India.

== History ==
It was originally erected by the Sultanate of Bijapur, then ruled by Ismail Adil Shah, to defend the left bank of the Zuari river. Conquered in AD 1520 by Krishnadevaraya, the emperor of the Vijayanagara Kingdom; he handed over this fort in the same year to the Portuguese Empire in exchange for protection of southern India against the northern India Mughal Empire.

Occupied by Portuguese forces, it was renovated and rebuilt, and two bastions were added in AD 1604. Between the sixteenth and seventeenth centuries it had a hundred pieces of artillery, a significant number for those times.

After the siege that was imposed by the Maratha Empire leader Sambhaji in AD 1684, it was remodeled as decided by the Viceroy of Portuguese India, Dom Francisco de Tavora, 1st Count of Alvor, as epigraphic inscription, which reads:

THE COUNT OF ALVOR, VICEROY OF INDIA, ORDERED THIS FORTRESS'S RENOVATION AFTER DEFENDING THE SIEGE OF SAMBHAJI ON 22 APRIL 1684.

It underwent a new reform campaign in AD 1745, on the order of Pedro Miguel de Almeida Portugal e Vasconcelos, the first Marquis of Alorna.

The fort's cannons were later sent to other forts and abandoned as a military post.

This fort is currently severely ruined, but one can still see the old gate of arms surmounted by the coat of arms of the Portuguese monarchy, and some sections of the walls and the moat.

Its gate has been a monument protected by the government of Goa, Daman and Diu since 1983.
