= Big Foot Museum =

Museum and theme park in Goa, India

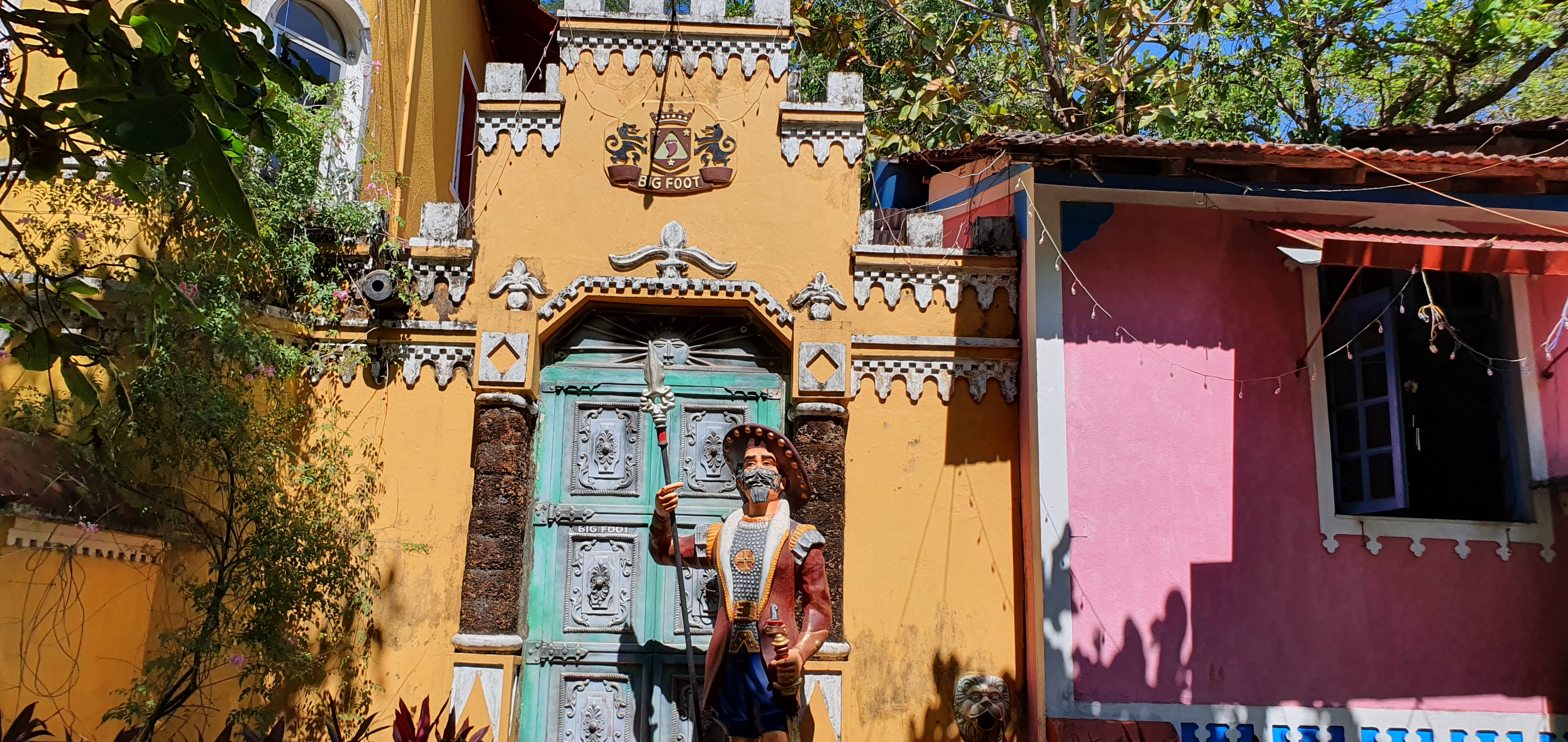
- The entrance of the museum, 2020
- Location: Loutolim, Goa, India
- Coordinates: 15.3396°N 73.9875°E
- Type: Private, ethnographic
- Key holdings: Statues, rural life
- Founder: Maendra Jocelino Araujo Alvares
- Curator: Maendra Alvares
- Owner: Maendra Alvares
- Parking: Yes
- Website: bigfootgoa.in

Big Foot Museum is a museum and theme park in the village of Loutolim in southern Goa, India, dedicated to rural Goan life. It was founded and run by the artist Maendra Alvares.

It is privately owned and recreates a Goan village in miniature showing what local rural life was like in the past.

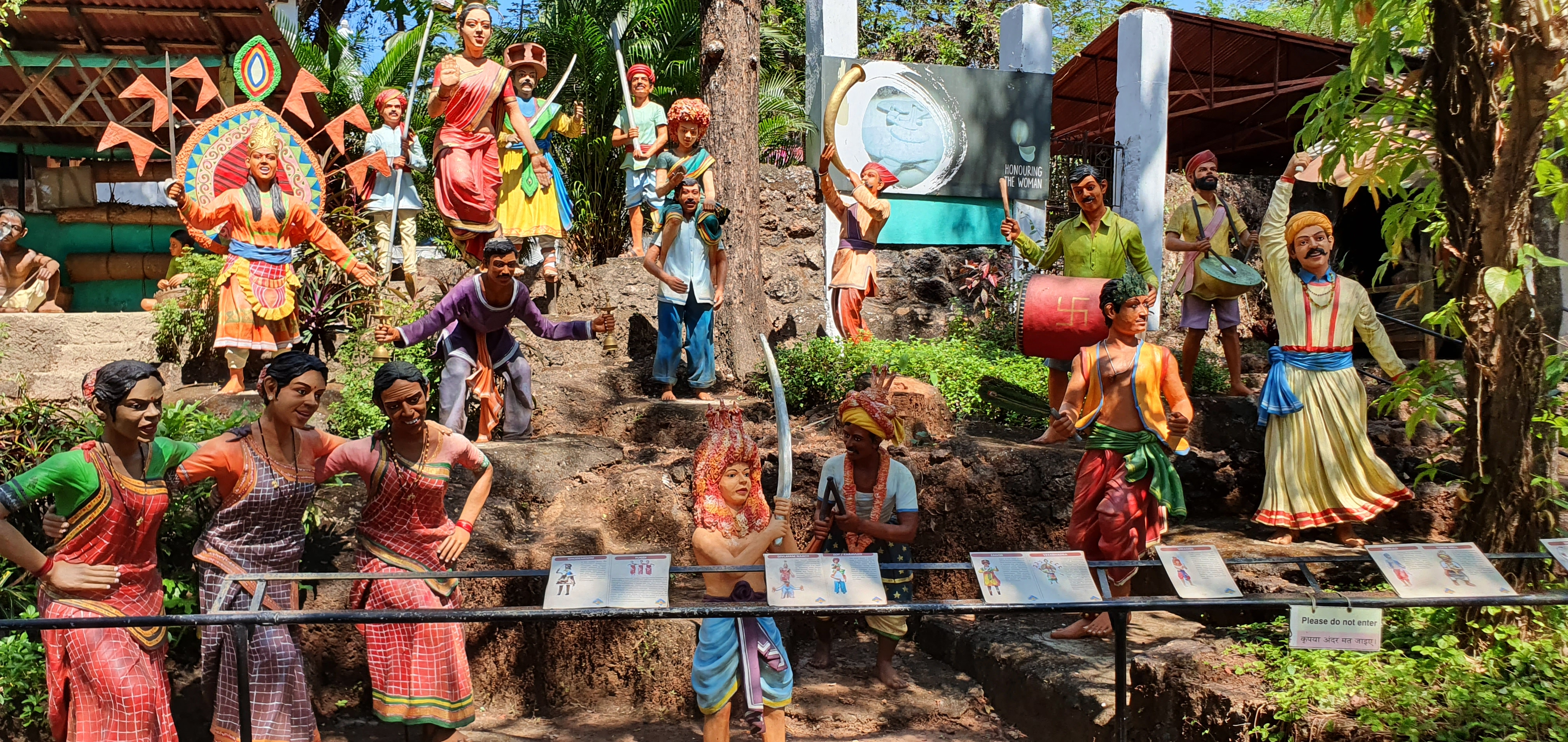
Scenes from rural life at The Big Foot.

== Left-Hander Museum ==
The World-Famous Left-Hander Museum is also on its campus.
