= Mario Miranda =

Indian cartoonist (1926–2011)

Mario Miranda OYC ComIH
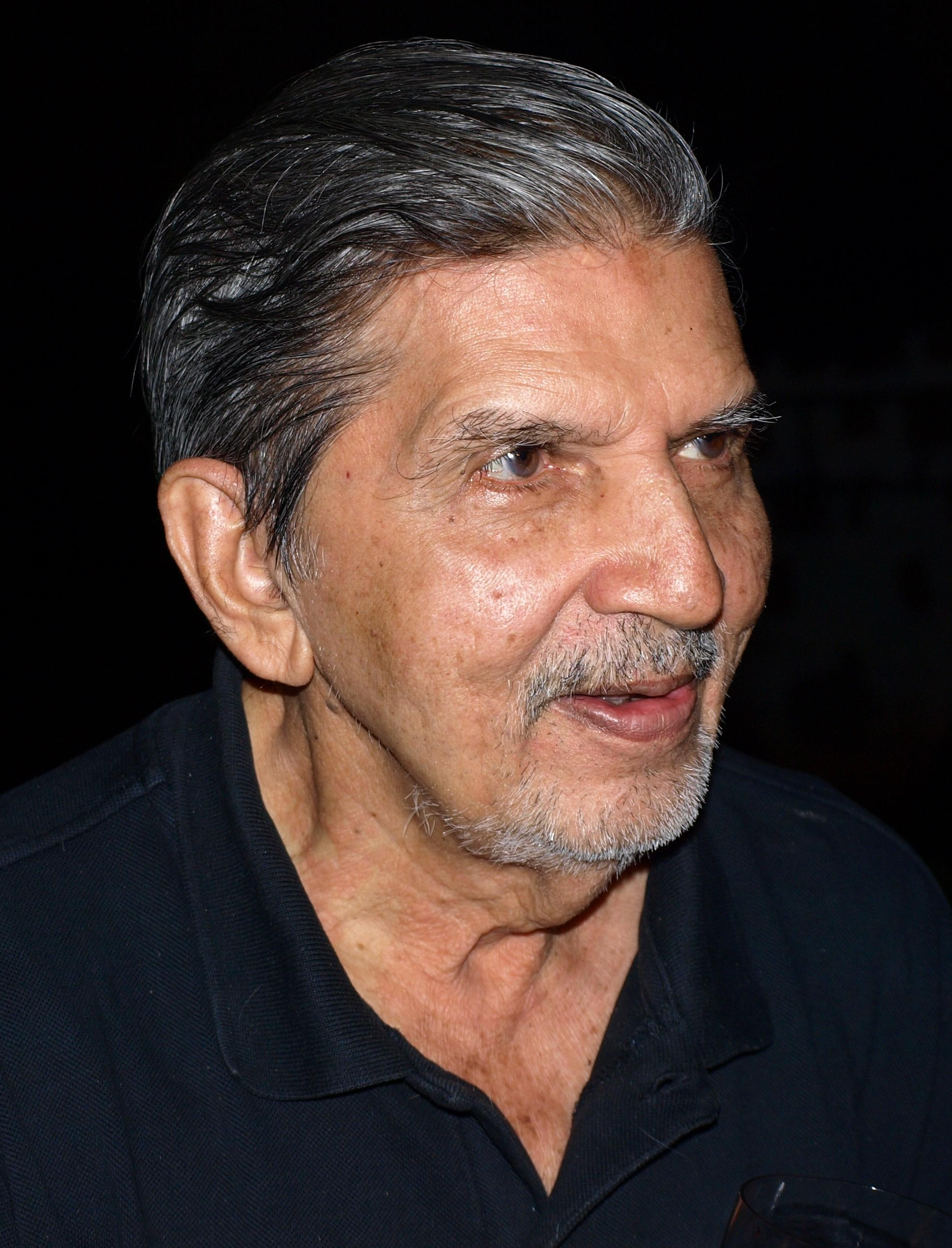
- Miranda in 2008
- Born: Mário João Carlos do Rosário de Brito Miranda; 2 May 1926; Damão, Portuguese India
- Died: 11 December 2011 (aged 85); Loutolim, Goa, India
- Education: St Joseph's Boys' High School; St. Xavier's College (B.A.)
- Occupations: Cartoonist; painter
- Known for: Cartoonist for The Illustrated Weekly of India
- Spouse: Habiba Hyderi de Miranda
- Children: 2
- Family: Tyabji–Hydari family (through wife)
- Awards: Padma Shri (1988); Padma Bhushan (2002); Padma Vibhushan (2012)
- Website: mariodemiranda.com

Mário João Carlos do Rosário de Brito Miranda OYC ComIH (2 May 1926 – 11 December 2011), also known as Mario de Miranda, was an Indian cartoonist and painter based in Loutolim, Goa. He had been a regular with The Times of India and other newspapers in Bombay, including The Economic Times, though he got his popularity with his works published in The Illustrated Weekly of India. He was awarded India's second highest civilian award, the Padma Vibhushan (posthumously) in 2012.

== Life and career ==
=== Early life ===
Mário João Carlos do Rosário de Brito Miranda was born on 2 May 1926, in Damão, Portuguese India, to Goan Catholic parents. At an early age, he would draw caricatures and sketch on the walls of his home, until his mother brought him a blank book. He then began making personalised postcards for his friends, charging them a token amount, in the 1930s and 1940s. He even started getting into trouble at school, for sketching Catholic priests. Miranda's early cartoons presented vignettes of Goan village life, a theme he is best known for even today. He would maintain diaries from the age of 10, sketching the life around him.

Miranda studied at St. Joseph's Boys' High School, Bangalore and then did a B.A. in history at St. Xavier's College, Mumbai, while focusing on the Indian Administrative Service (IAS). Thereafter he started studying architecture at the behest of his parents, though he soon lost interest. He then began getting small commissions and would sketch people in his private diaries in 1949. He loved good food and red wine in moderation but would mainly visit eateries and taverns to document the lives of the patrons.

=== Career beginnings ===
Miranda started his career in an advertising studio, where he worked for four years, before taking up cartooning full-time. He got his first job as a cartoonist with The Illustrated Weekly of India which published a few of his works. His drawings & cartoons also brought him an offer to work at the Current magazine. A year later, the Times of India offered him a slot, even though they had rejected him at first. Thereafter, his creations, such as Miss Nimbupani and Miss Fonseca, appeared on a regular basis in Femina, Economic Times, and The Illustrated Weekly of India.

Mario then won a grant by the Calouste Gulbenkian Foundation and lived in Portugal for year, helping him "broaden his horizons". He then moved to London, working for different newspapers and even working in television animation. During his five years spent there, his caricatures were published in magazines like Mad, Lilliput and Punch. He then travelled to many countries, either working or conducting exhibitions.

=== Return to Mumbai and marriage ===
Miranda returned to India for good in the late 1980s and was offered back his old job with the Times of India in Mumbai, where he worked with noted cartoonist, R.K. Laxman.

Thereafter, Miranda met artist Habiba Hydari, who was part of the Hyderabadi Tyabji–Hydari family and grand-daughter of Akbar Hydari. They got married and had two sons, Rahul and Rishad.

=== Recognition and fame ===
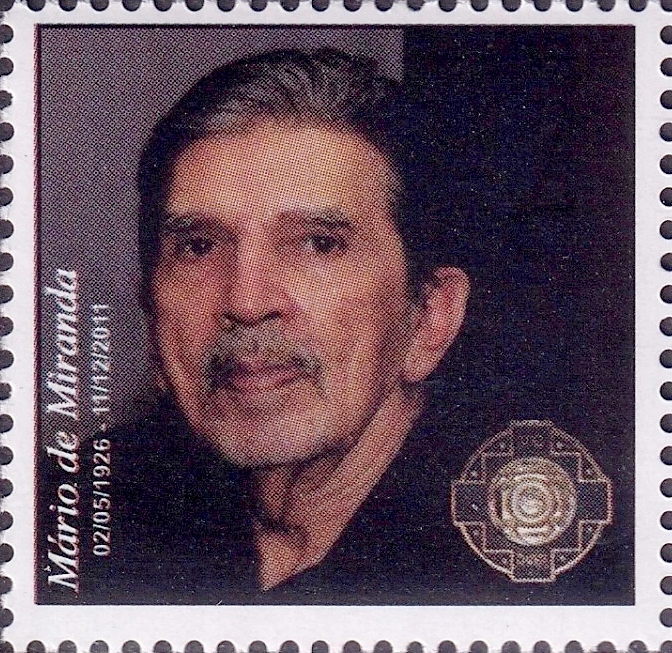
Miranda on a 2026 stamp of India

Miranda's big break came in 1974, when, at the invitation of the United States Information Services, he travelled to America, which enabled him to promote his art and interact with other cartoonists in the United States and also got a chance to work with Charles M. Schulz, the creator of Peanuts) and met Herblock, the editorial cartoonist of the Washington Post.

He held solo exhibitions in over 22 countries, including the United States, Japan, Brazil, Australia, Singapore, France, Yugoslavia, and Portugal.

=== Later years and death ===
After retirement, Miranda lived in his ancestral home, at Loutolim, a village in Salcete, Goa, with his wife Habiba. Even after he retired, Miranda's work was seen regularly in Mumbai publications, and he was invited to travel to countries such as Mauritius and Spain, and draw their local cultures. On 11 December 2011, Miranda died of natural causes at his home in Loutolim. Mario's body was then taken to the Hindu crematorium at Pajifond in Margao, where his pyre was lit by his younger son Rishaad as per his wishes.

Indian cartoonist Graphi and fine artist, Vijay N Seth (Vins) paid tribute to Miranda, whom he considered as a mentor:

With pen & ink that were at his command to churn out lines that every nib would be jealous of, he brushed aside the old school of cartooning using the brush, and set a new norm to use the nib pen and to master it for this branch of art. Mario created characters that gave his daily audience their quota of a smile without malice. His trips around the globe produced subtle close observations of the local musings – a fitting example of how far can one stretch the parameters of this branch of neglected art.

== Style ==
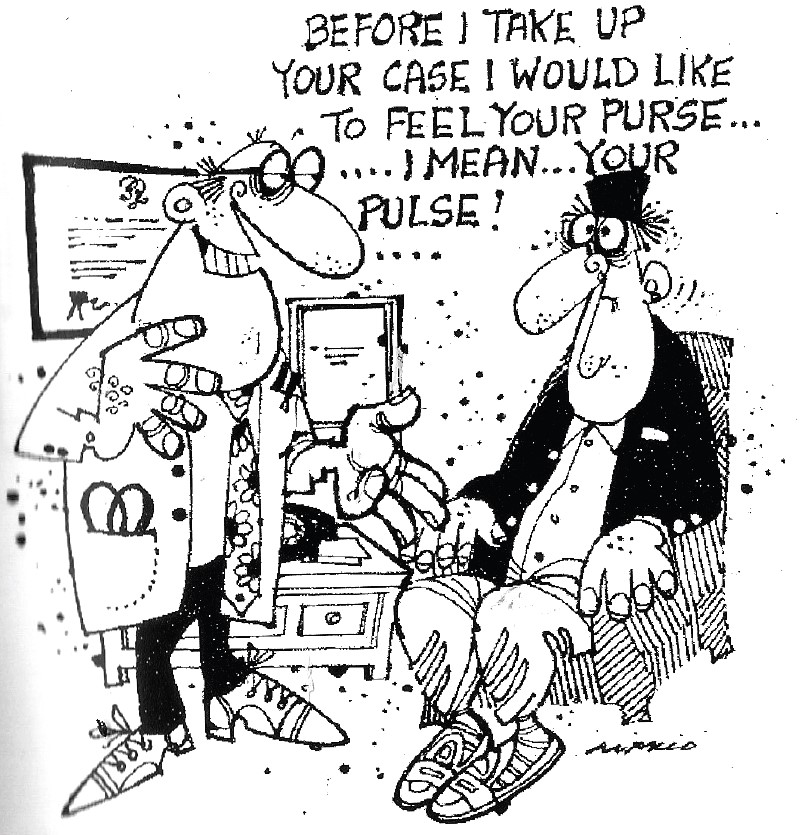
A cartoon by Miranda

According to Aaron Renier (who created the Google Doodle commemorating Miranda on his 90th birth anniversary in 2016), Miranda's most popular style of cartooning was "very flat with criss-crossing interactions". Renier went on to explain:

That is what I liked most about his work. Trying to pick out who knows who, who's watching who, who's annoyed by who, who's enamoured by who.

Miranda's cartoons often indulged in sexist stereotypes, with the women being drawn as curvaceous and having bulging eyes. He would observe people everywhere (like eateries, taverns, weddings, the bus stop, the post office) and document their social life. However, he always stayed away from drawing political cartoons.

Art critic Uma Nair describes how all his work was subtly witty. Describing his drawing style, she finds that his tales were told through cubism and the nature of the contours of his work, stating that his "geometric jiggles" coupled with subtle colours helped convey the emotions of the characters. His works would include people from all walks of life interacting with one another. Additionally, he would capture the essence of Goan life. She goes on to describe:

Mario’s drawings, like his signature, had a squared-off, serene quality, a frame of high and mischievous intention that suggested aspirations beyond the momentary smile most cartoons are content to induce... he created multitudes that had a collective melody and mood, his backgrounds were never in excess, always a quaint minimalism that endeared and endured-he also pressed towards the foreground an impressionist zeal that had a zing to it.

== Beyond cartooning ==
Besides cartooning, Miranda's murals are present on various buildings in Goa and other parts of India. Late in life he took to paintings which received wide response.

Over the years, he published several books, including Laugh it Off, Goa with Love, and Germany in Wintertime.

Besides his own books, he illustrated books by Dom Moraes (A Journey to Goa), Manohar Malgonkar (Inside Goa) and Mario Cabral e Sa (Legends of Goa). He also illustrated many children's books, including Dul-Dul, The Magic Clay Horse (1968), The Adventures of Pilla the Pup (1969), and Lumbdoom, The Long-Tailed Langoor (1968), all written by Uma Anand and published by India Book House, Mumbai, under its Echo imprint. He also illustrated for Balbharati textbooks by MSBTPCR in the 1970s.

In 1951, he collaborated with Sanskrit scholar Jose Pereira and IAS officer Alban Couto (Maria Aurora Couto's husband) to publish a special issue of Marg on Goan art and culture.

Miranda was the creative assistant during the filming of The Sea Wolves.

He loved to travel and listening to music and it was his ambition to experiment further with water colours and to write memories of his early years in Goa, on retirement. He was not able to fulfil these two latter ambitions.

In the 1990s, Rushi Yazdegardi (then owner) of Café Mondegar asked Mario Miranda to draw murals (cartoons) on two opposite walls. Both walls have different themes. Whilst one wall is dedicated to the Life in Mumbai, the other wall is dedicated to Atmosphere in the Café.

Murals

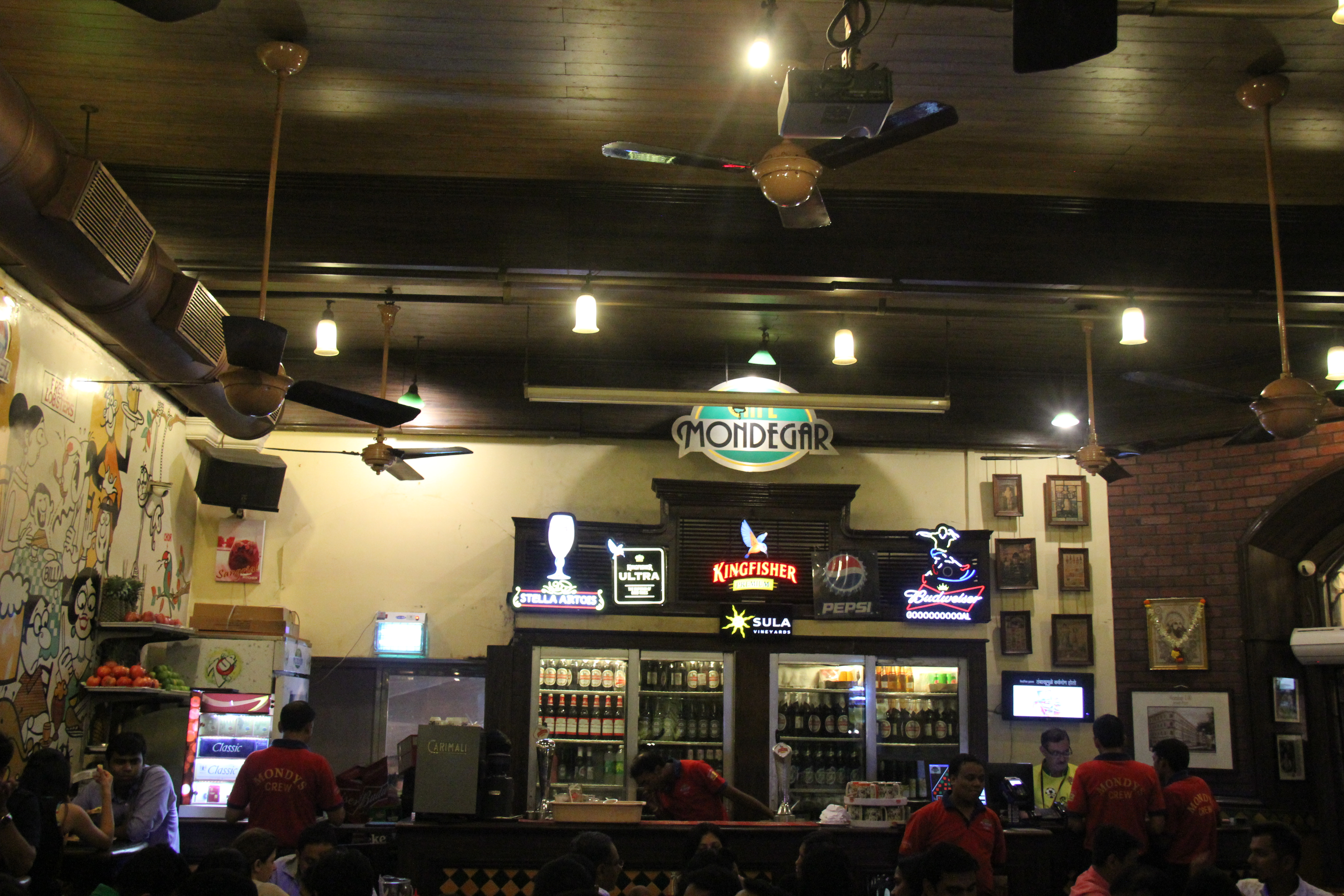
Cafe bar with murals

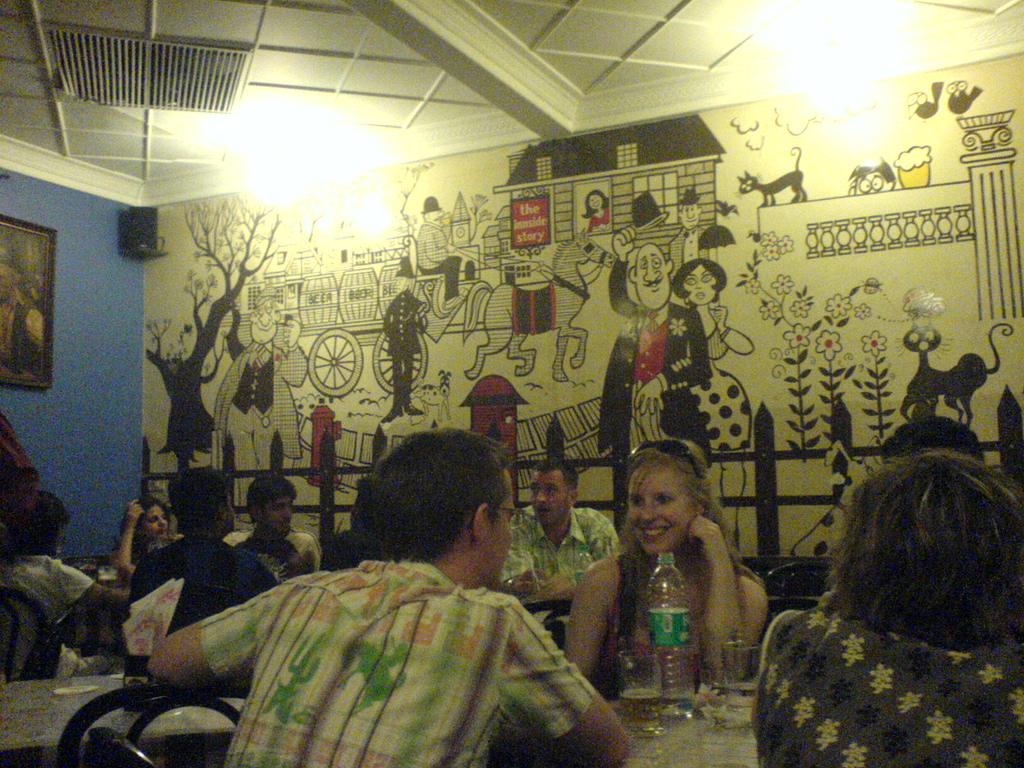
Murals on restaurant walls

When the new municipal market of Panjim was inaugurated in 2004, Miranda was invited to paint a mural on its walls by then Chief Minister Manohar Parrikar. Delighted with how the new complex had turned out, he refused to charge fees from the government for his work.

== Legacy ==
Miranda's house features in the 1985 Shyam Benegal film, Trikaal, which is loosely based on Miranda's family. Benegal admitted to having been deeply influenced by Miranda's house and family after a visit. He recalls how during his visit, he was told of how one of Miranda's ancestors accidentally killed the wrong Rane during the Revolt of the Ranes in Goa, a story which inspired him to make the film.

In 2005, Gerard da Cunha began working on a book on the artist and collected 13,000 of Miranda's works, tracking them down through various sources. In 2016, an exhibition titled "A pocketful of chuckles" on the works of Mário de Miranda was held at Gallery Gitanjali at Panaji. This was the largest exhibition of the original cartoons and paintings of Mario de Miranda. The Life of Mario: 1949, a compilation of caricatures drawn by the 23-year old Mario Miranda in 1949, was also released by da Cunha. This was the third in a series that includes the years 1950 and 1951.

In March 2025, Chief Minister Pramod Sawant announced that a few galleries in the renovated Goa State Museum at Adil Shah Palace, Panaji, would be dedicated to the work of Miranda.

== Awards and honours ==
In 1988, Miranda was featured in the national integration "Mile Sur Mera Tumhara" video, which included multiple notable Indians in arts, films, literature, music, and sports. He was awarded the Padma Shri in 1988, the Padma Bhushan in 2002 and All India Cartoonists's Association, Bangalore, honoured him with a lifetime achievement award. The King of Spain, Juan Carlos, conferred on Mario the highest civilian honour of "Cross of the Order of Isabel the Catholic" which was presented to him on 11 November 2009 at his family home in Loutolim by tourism counsellor Don Miguel Nieto Sandoval. On 29 December 2009 Portugal, under the President of the Republic Aníbal Cavaco Silva, made him "Commander of the Order of Prince Henry", a Portuguese National Order of knighthood. Mario Miranda was posthumously awarded the Padma Vibhushan, India's second highest civilian award, by the President of India on 4 April 2012.

After his death in 2011, the Goa Legislative Assembly made an obituary reference to him in March 2012. In 2013, a road junction in Mumbai was named after Miranda. In May 2016, Google honoured him with a doodle on his 90th birth anniversary. The doodle showcased a typical Mumbai neighbourhood scene during the rains.
