= Cafe Mondegar =

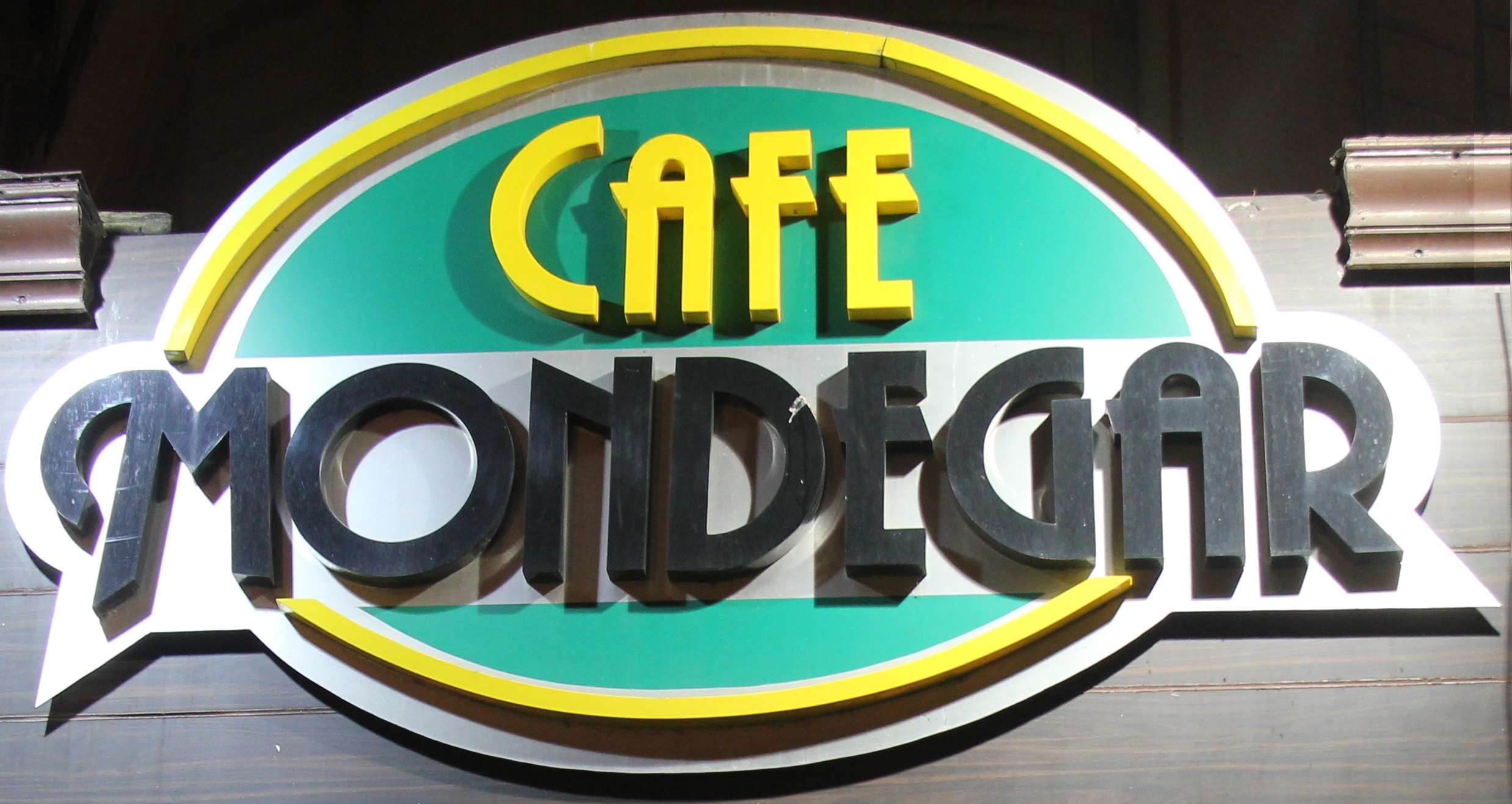

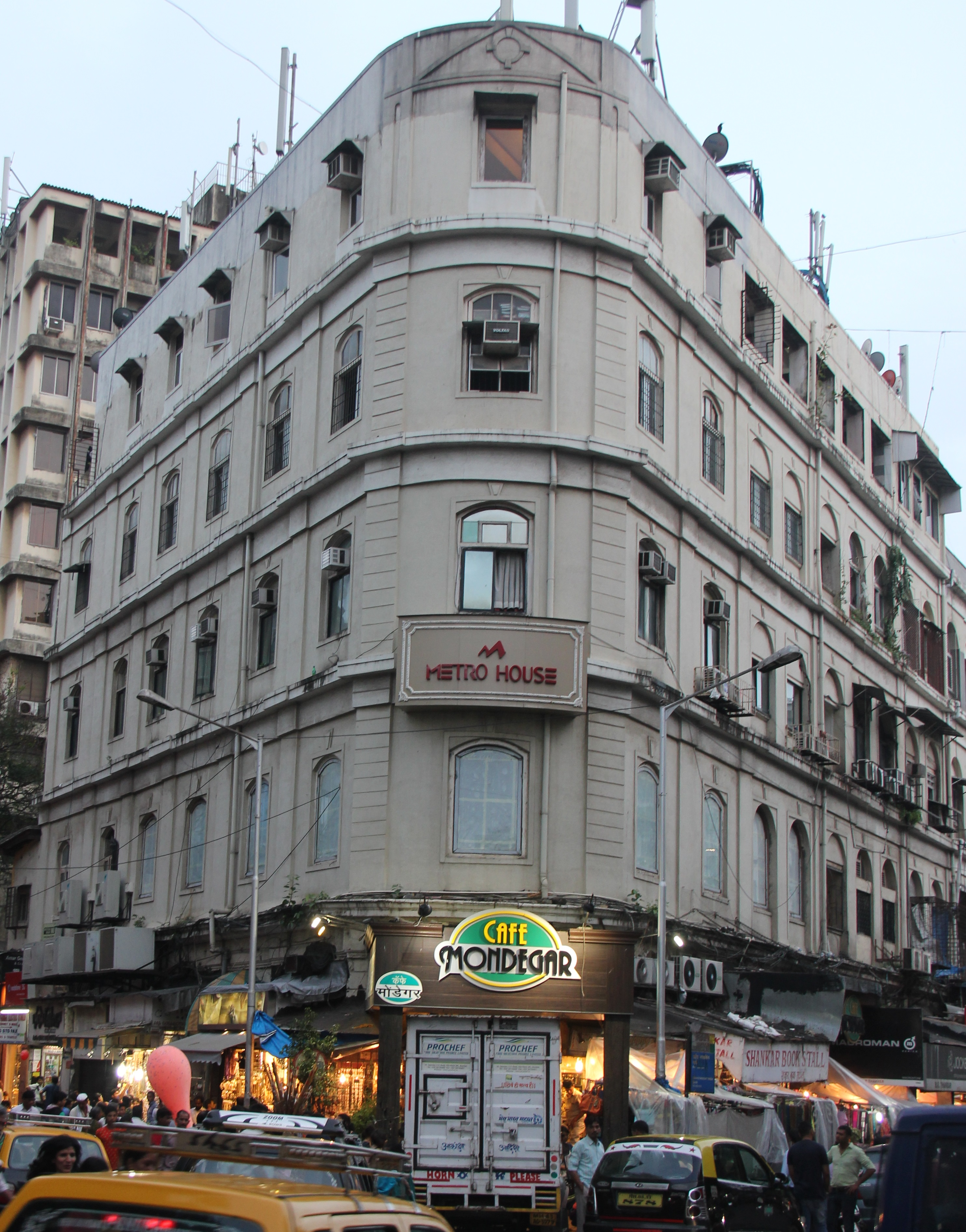
- Cafe Mondegar entrance

- Location in Mumbai, India

Restaurant information
- Established: 1 April 1932
- Owners: Rusi Yazdegardi; Hoshang Yazdegardi & Family
- Dress code: None
- Location: Metro House, Shahid Bhagat Singh Road, Colaba Causeway, Mumbai, Maharashtra, 400005, India
- Coordinates: 18.924158°N 72.832126°E
- Other locations: None
- Other information: Open daily: 0800 to 2400 Hrs

Cafe Mondegar (a.k.a. Café Mondegar and Mondy's) is a popular landmark and tourist attraction of Colaba, Mumbai. Famous Indian cartoonist and painter Mario Miranda painted murals (his cartoons) on all inner walls and entrance ceiling of the restaurant.

== History ==
Cafe Mondegar was started in 1932 by Iranian Zoroastrians (Parsi settlers in India) as an Irani café. The current building (Metro House), then housed a hotel called Apollo Hotel and the café was started in the reception area of the hotel. By the mid 20th century, the café introduced a jukebox, (first in Mumbai) and was simultaneously converted into a restaurant. By the 1990s, Cafe Mondegar was refurbished, Mario Miranda's murals were painted on the walls & ceiling, and the restaurant was converted into a bar. Café is owned by Yazdegardi family and Rusi Yazdegardi / Hoshang Yazdegardi are the Managing partners of the business.

== Location ==
Cafe Mondegar is situated in the Metro House in Colaba Causeway, 450 meters North-West of Gateway of India, 200 meters North-East of Leopold Cafe and 400 meters South of Elphinstone College in Mumbai.

== Murals ==
In the 1990s, owner Rusi Yazdegardi asked Mario Miranda to draw murals (cartoons) on two opposite walls; i.e. the wall adjacent to the main entrance and wall opposite the main entrance. Both walls have different themes, one dedicated to Life in Mumbai, the other dedicated to Atmosphere in the Café.

Mario Miranda sketched his drawings on canvas before their being rendered on the restaurant walls with the help of students from Sir J.J. Institute of Applied Art under his supervision.

Murals

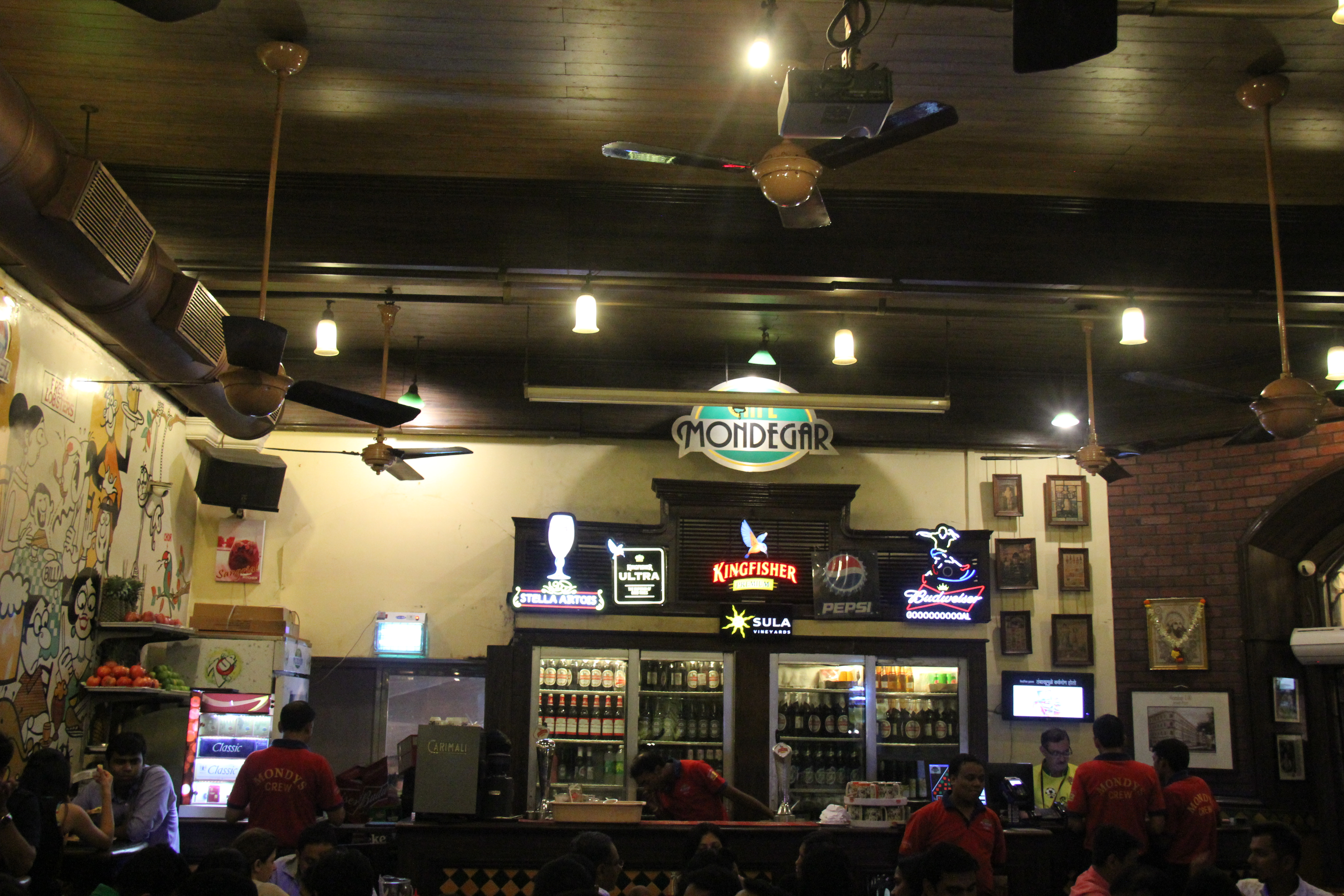
Cafe bar with murals

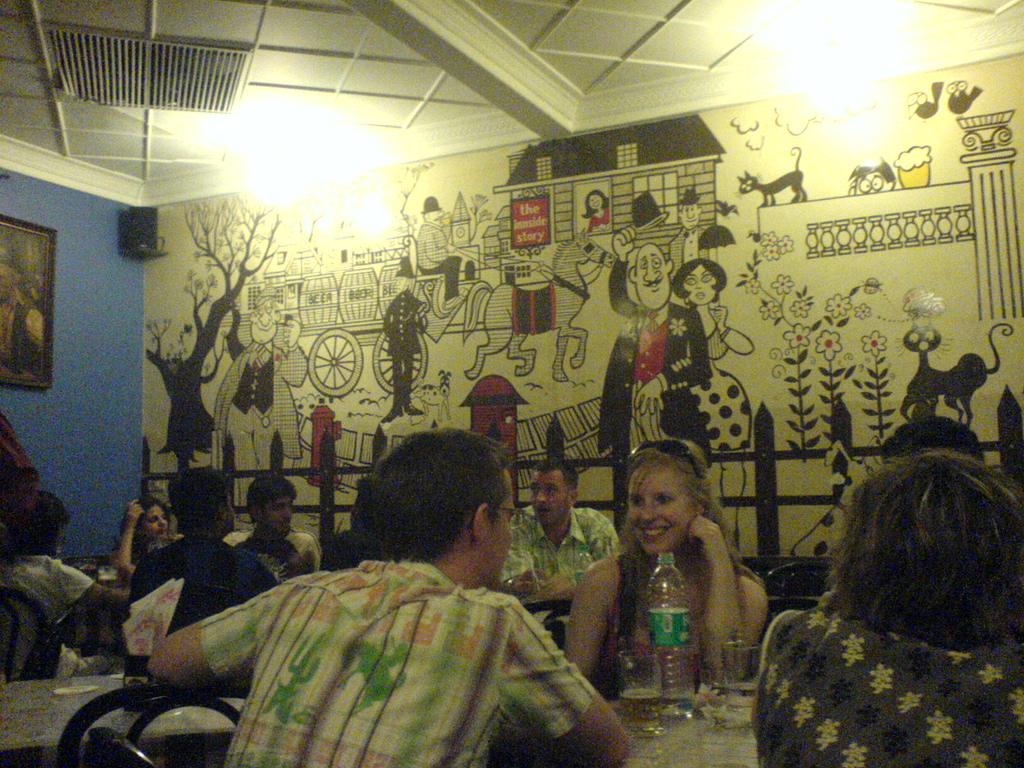
Murals on restaurant walls
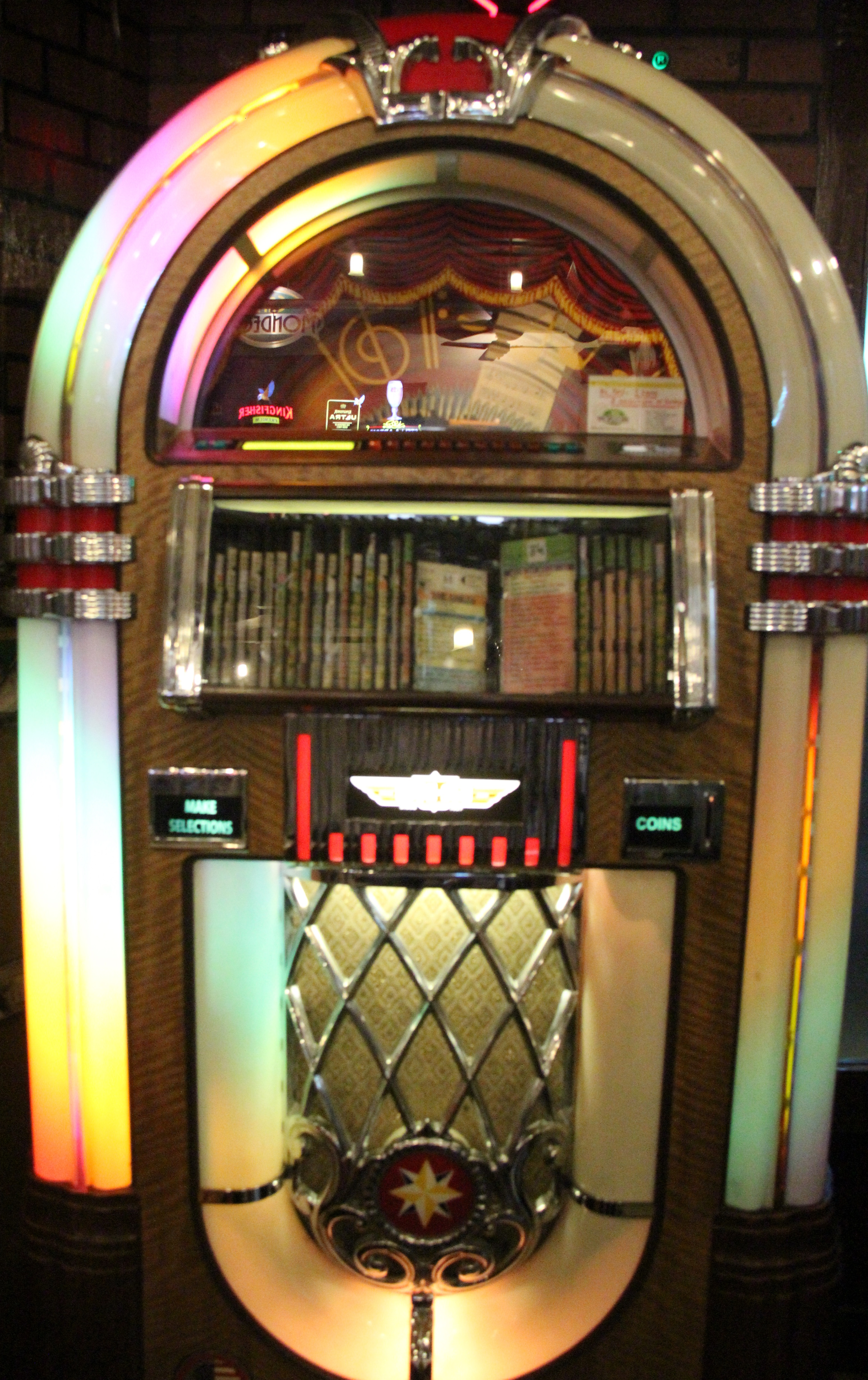
Jukebox in Café Mondegar

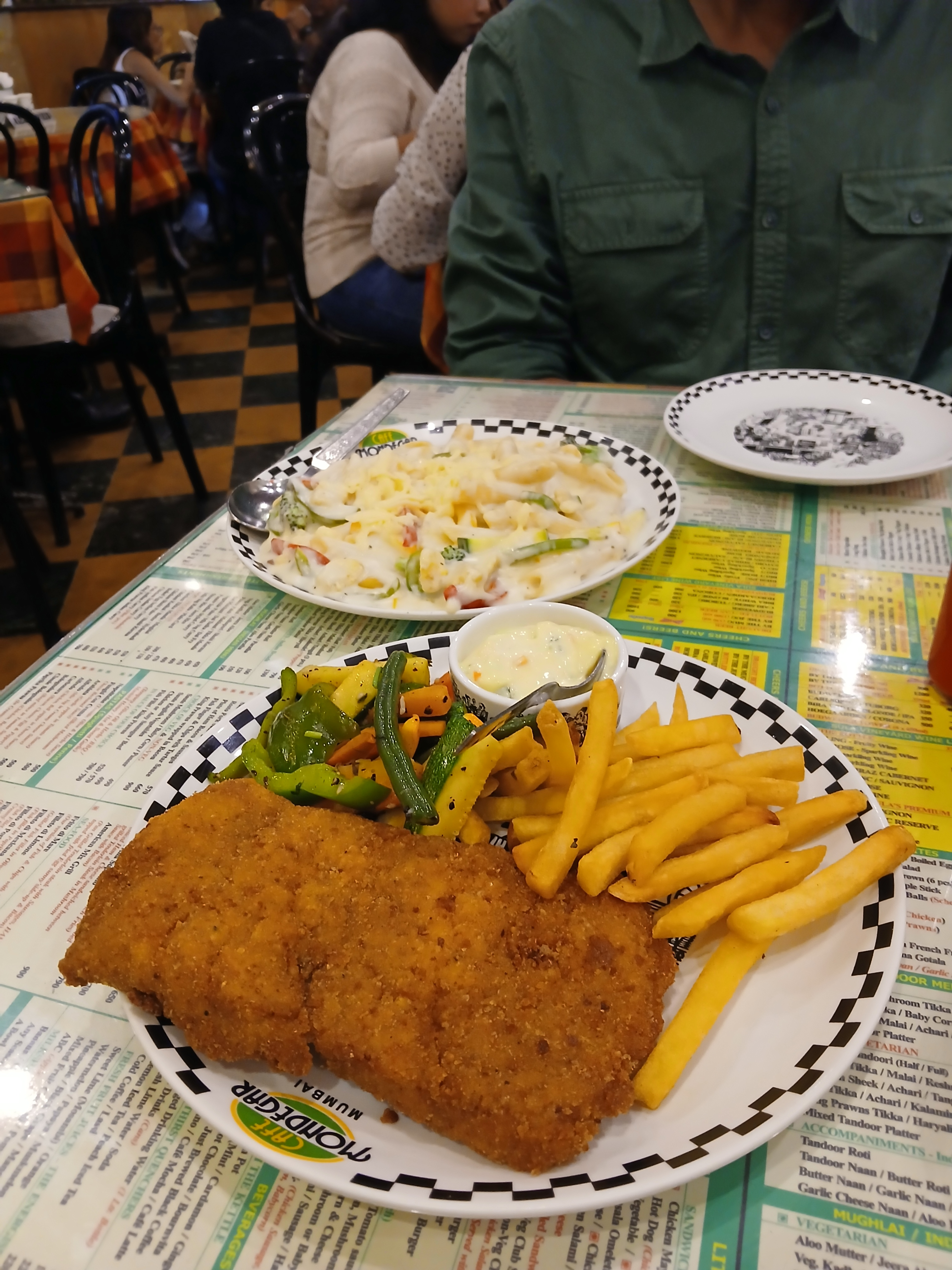
Fish and Chips

== See also ==
- Irani café
- Leopold Cafe
- Mario Miranda
