= Filipe Nery Xavier =

Portuguese litterateur and historian (1801–1875)

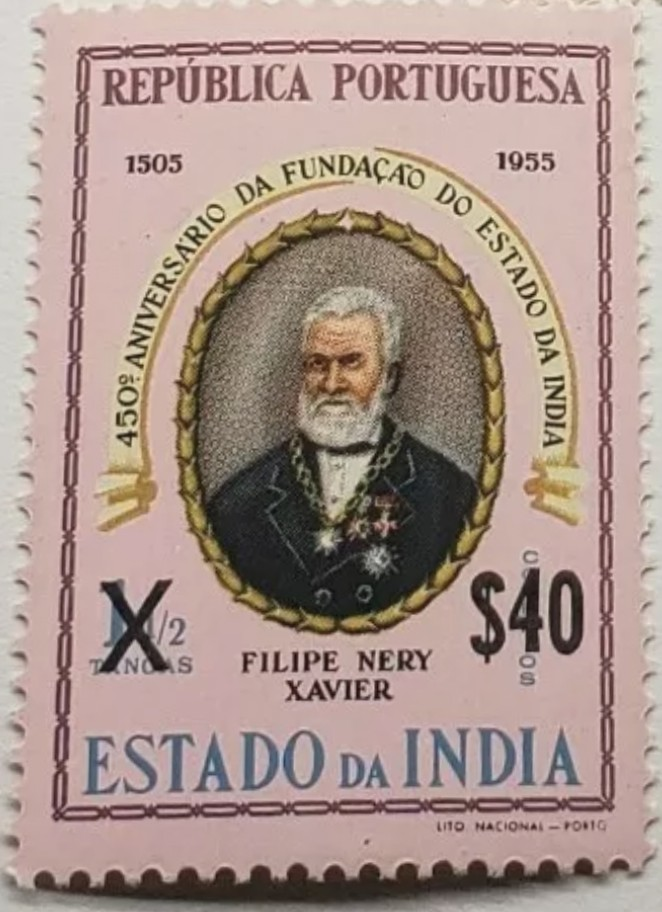
- Filipe Nery Xavier commemorative stamp - 450th anniversary of Portuguese India
- Born: 17 March 1801; São Salvador, Loutolim, Portuguese India
- Died: 26 May 1875 (aged 74); Nova Goa, Goa, Portuguese India
- Occupation: Historian

Filipe Nery Xavier (Note: Sometimes spelt Felipe, Felippe, Filippe or Neri) (17 March 1801 - 26 May 1875) was a Portuguese administrator, littérateur and historian. He was descended from a "very distinguished" Gaud Saraswat Brahmin (GSB) family that had converted to Christianity when the Portuguese arrived in India. Despite having no or very little European blood, the Xavier family flourished in the eighteenth and nineteenth centuries, holding positions such as interim Secretary General of Portuguese India, secretary to the Governor General of Mozambique, president of the municipal council of Mozambique and commander of the artillery of Lisbon's National Guard.

Nery Xavier was the director of the National Press (Imprensa Nacional), and held a position in the administration working for the Secretary General Joaquim Heliodoro da Cunha Rivara, a role always held by a man nominated by Lisbon. Nery Xavier was a fellow of the Lisbon Academy of Sciences.

== Legacy ==
Filipe Neri Xavier Road in the capital of Goa, Panjim, is named in his honour, fittingly adjacent to the Historical Archives.

== Honours ==
Orders

- Knight, Order of the Immaculate Conception of Vila Viçosa (Portuguese Royal Family)
- Commander, Military Order of Christ
