= Loutolim =

Loutolim Loutulim
- Village
- Location in Goa, India Loutolim (India)
- Coordinates: 15.33°N 73.98°E
- Country: India
- State: Goa
- District: South Goa
- Sub-district: Salcete
- Past Country (1510 to 1961): Portugal

Area
  - Total: 17.81 km^{2} (6.88 sq mi)
- Elevation: 32 m (105 ft)

Population (2011)
  - Total: 6,121
  - Density: 343.7/km^{2} (890.1/sq mi)

Languages
  - Official: Konkani
- Time zone: UTC+5:30 (IST)
- PIN: 403718
- Vehicle registration: GA-08

Loutolim or Loutulim (Konkani: Lottli pronounced:[lɔːʈlĩː], Portuguese: Loutulim) is a large village of South Goa district in the state of Goa, India. It is in the Salcete sub-district.

== History ==
According to a legend, Brahmins from northern India founded the settlement of Loutolim when they emigrated to Goa after the Saraswati River in their homeland dried up.

Beginning in the 1500s the Jesuits began the Christianization of Goa and in 1567 Diogo Rodrigues, the Portuguese captain of Rachol Fort, ordered the burning and destruction of all the temples in the village. Some Hindu villagers fled to territories governed by the Hindu King, the Sonde Raja, across the Zuari River with their idols, including the idol of Shri Ramnath in what was later known as the Novas Conquistas (New Conquests). Those who started in Loutolim became Christian. The Salvador do Mundo (Saviour of the World) church was built by the Jesuits in 1586 for local converts.

Ramnath, a Hindu deity with a temple in Loutolim.

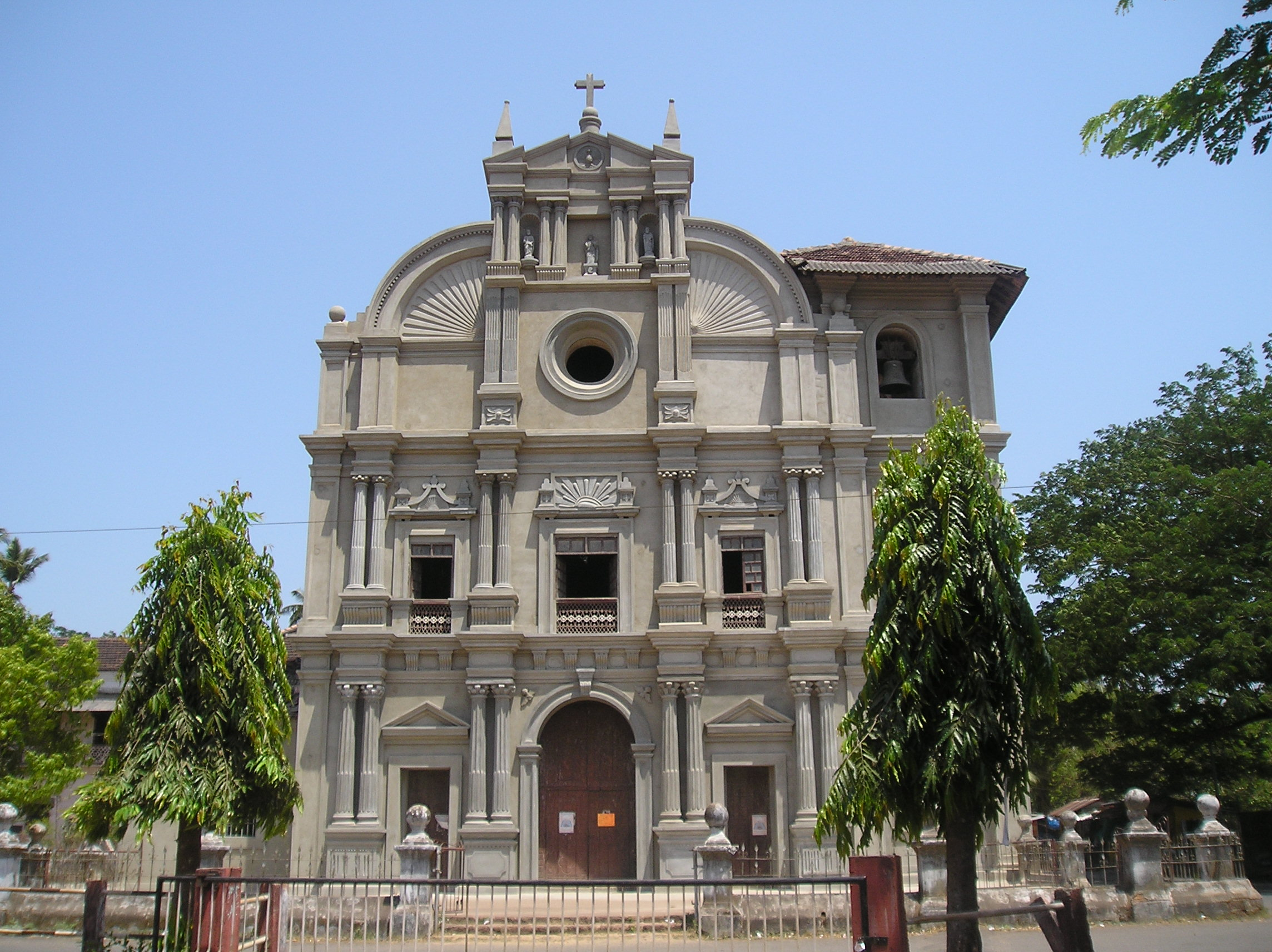
The Saviour of the World church.

== Location ==
Loutolim is located approximately 10 km (6.2 mi) from Margao, the headquarters of South Goa district. It has an average elevation of 32 m (105 ft) and is situated in Salcete. The river Zuari flows along one side of Loutolim and it is surrounded by the villages of Verna, Raia, Camorlim, Borim and Quelosim.

== Religion ==
There is a Catholic church called the Saviour of the World, and a Hindu temple, the Sri Ramnath temple.

== Notable sites ==
- Big Foot Museum is a museum and theme park.

== Notable people ==
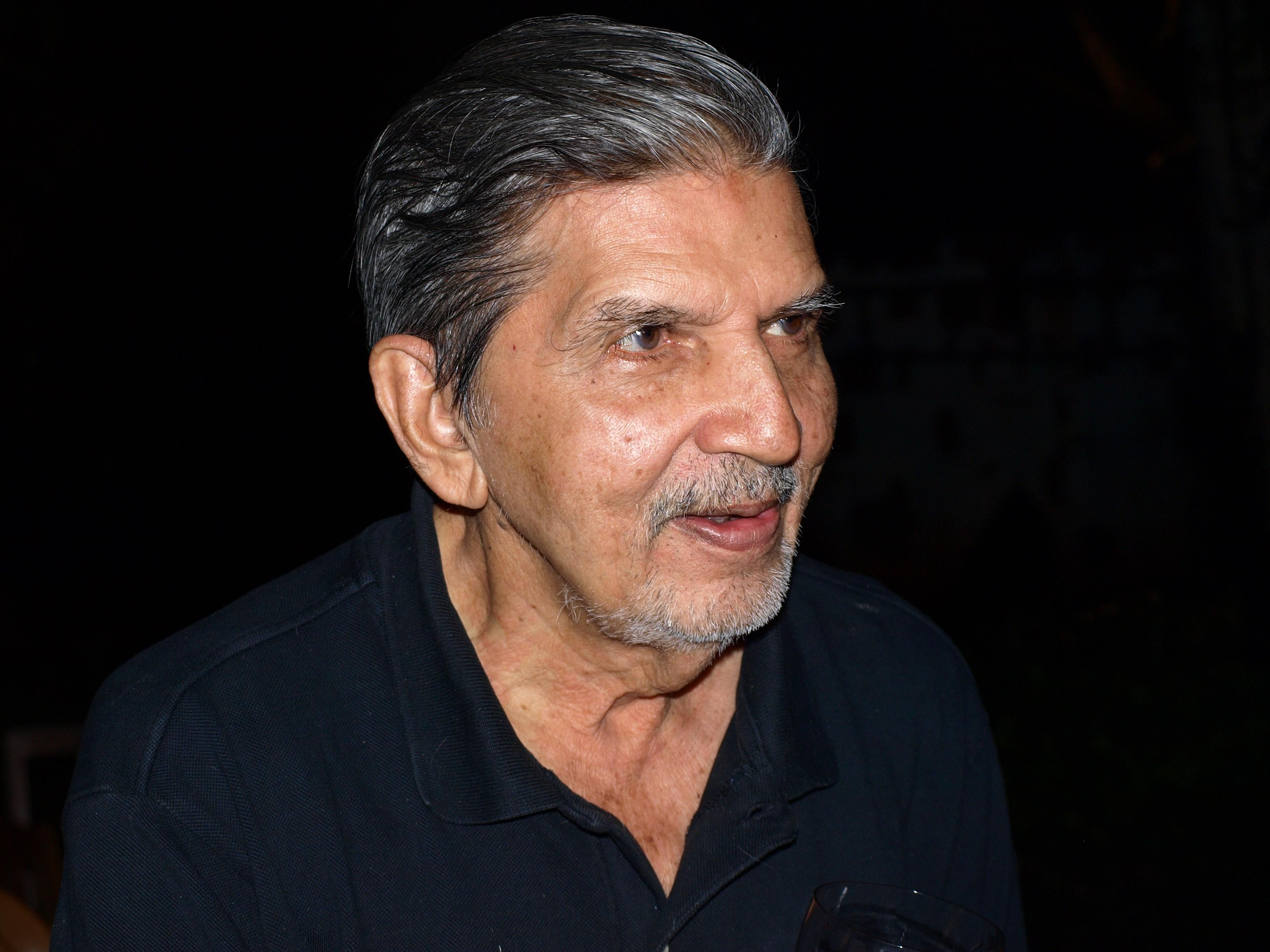

Mario Miranda (1926–2011): Indian cartoonist.

Filipe Neri Xavier (1801–1875): Goan scholar, administrator and writer known for his historical research and writings on the comunidades of Goa.

Torcato Figueiredo: Goan personality associated with the traditional musical and dance form mando.

Oscar de Sequeira Nazareth: Goan entrepreneur associated with the traditional Goan liqueur Armada.

Emiliano D'Cruz: Goan musician.

Meghnad Desai, Baron Desai|Meghnad Desai (1940–2025): Indian-born British economist, academic and politician who served as a member of the House of Lords in the United Kingdom.

Mario Pimenta: Goan filmmaker and director of Job Needed (2025), which is Goa's first AI-generated film.

Xiyan Almeida: Goan singer who won first prize in the 8–11 years solo category at the 2025 Vem Cantar Portuguese Song Contest and first prize in the 12–15 years solo category at the 2026 edition of the competition.

== Gallery ==
Laterite sculpture of the poet, Mirabai at the Big foot museum.

The foot imprint at Big foot museum is often adorned with money.

The gate outside Big foot museum with the statue of a guarding soldier.

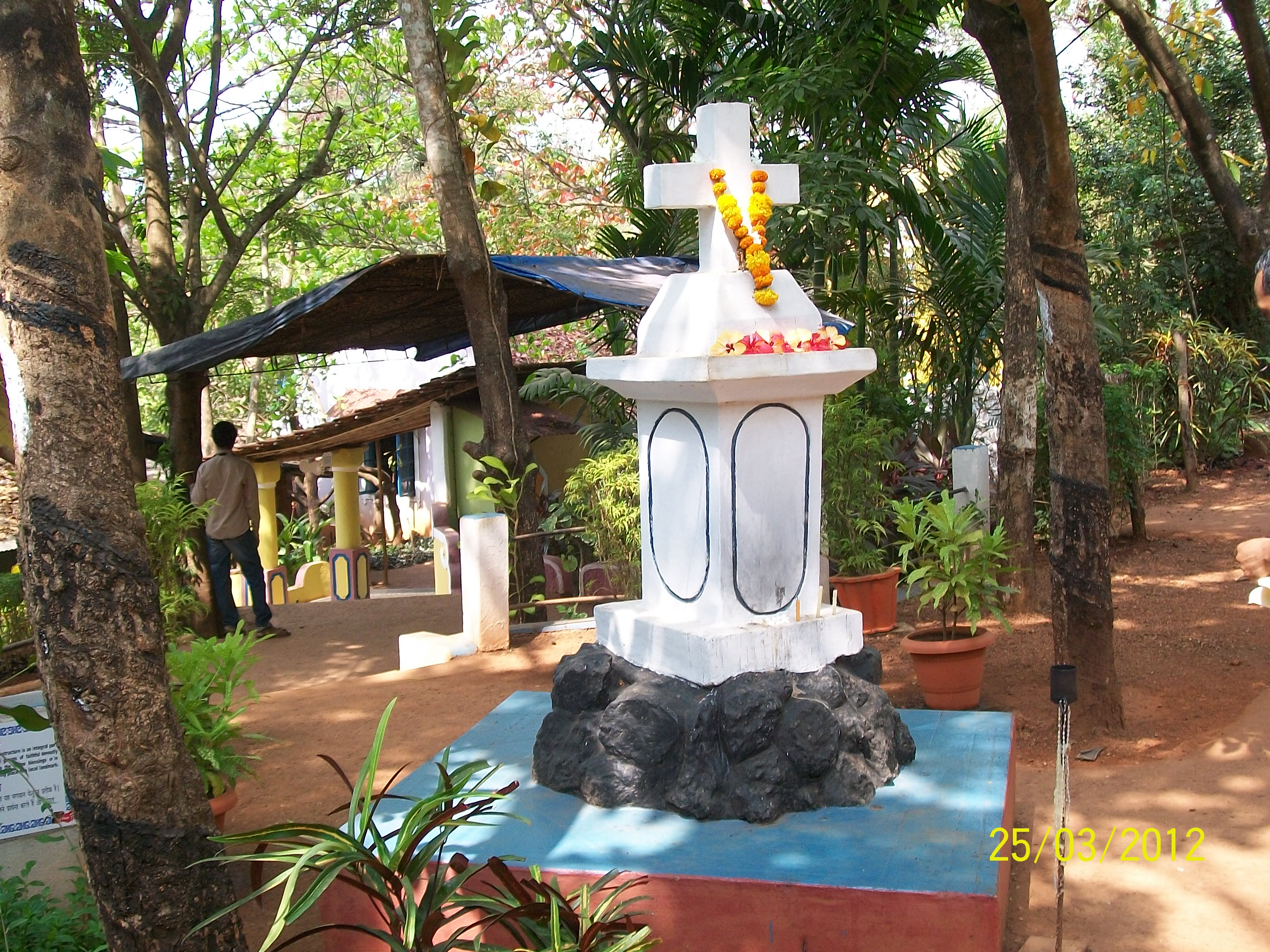
A typical roadside cross seen across Goa's villages and towns.

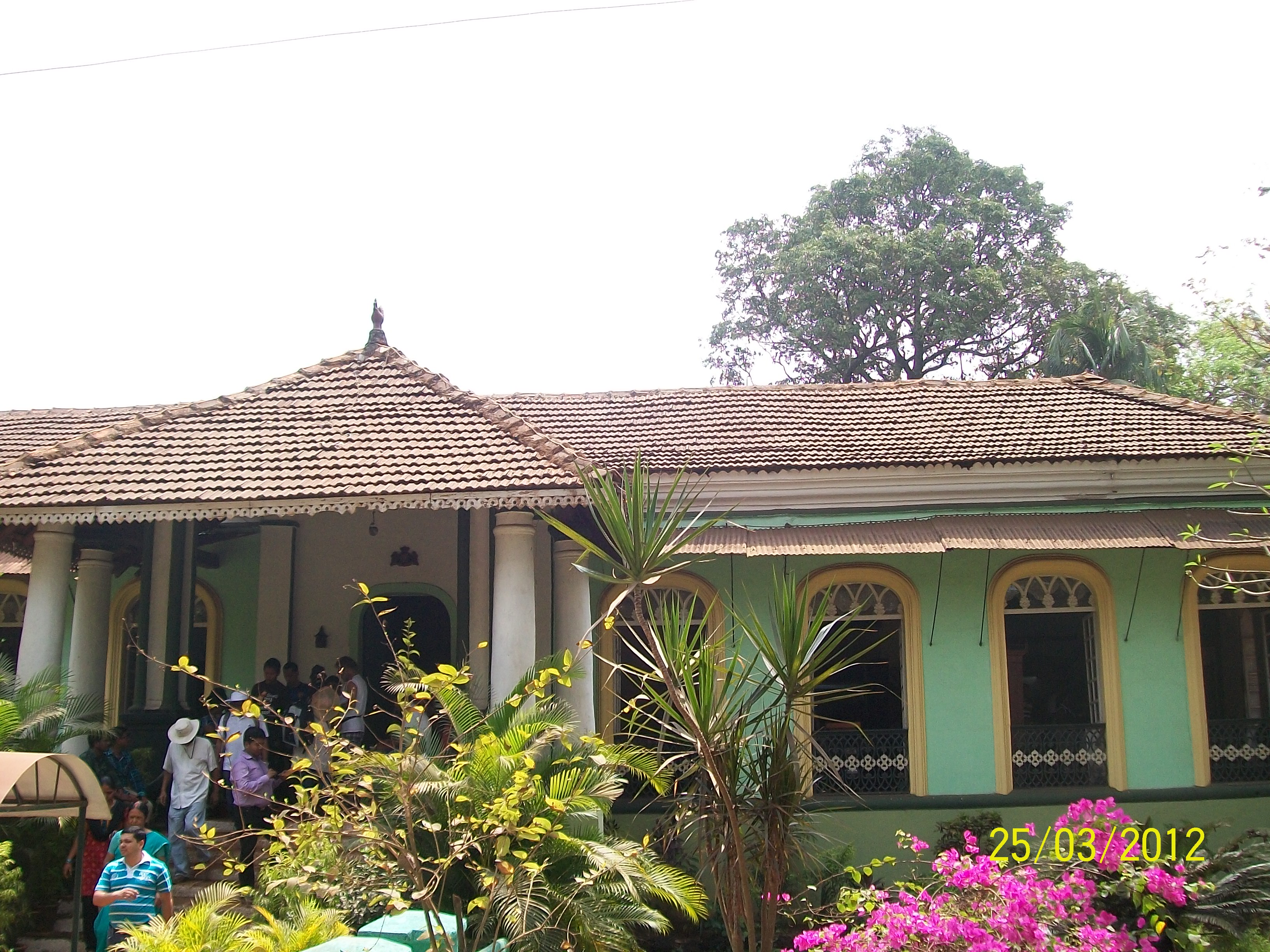
Front facade of Casa Araujo Alvares.

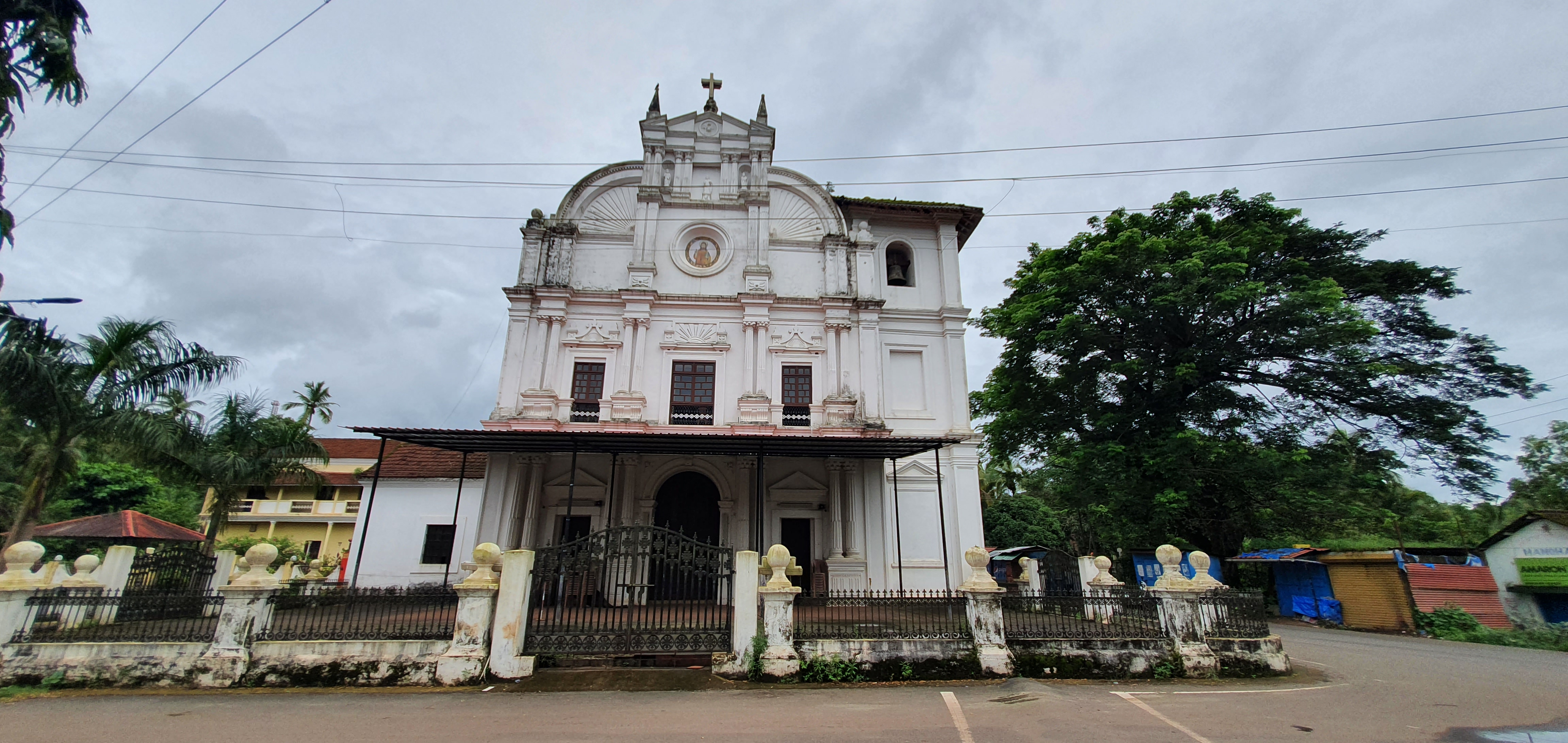
Church of the Saviour of the World

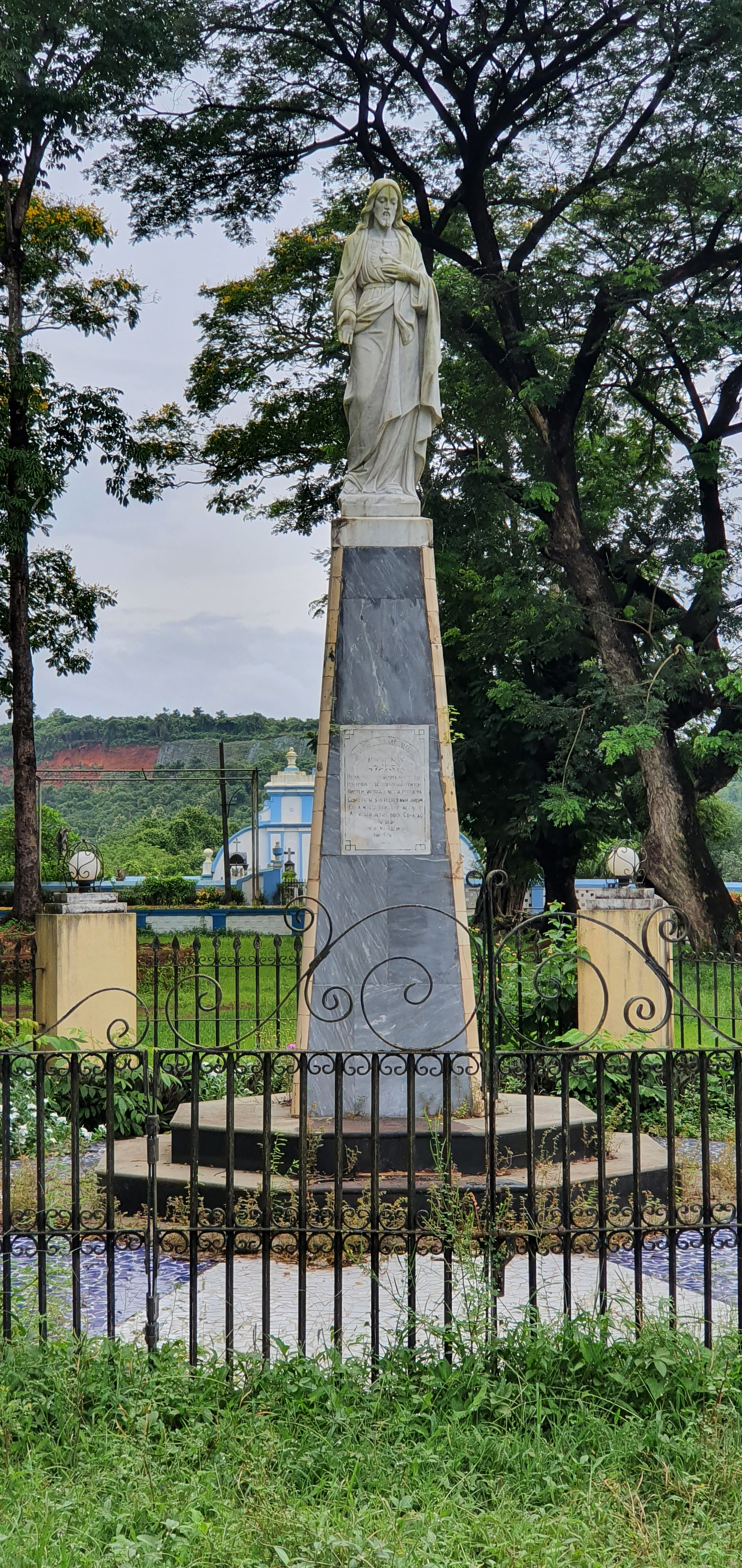
Statue of the Savior of the World located opposite the church

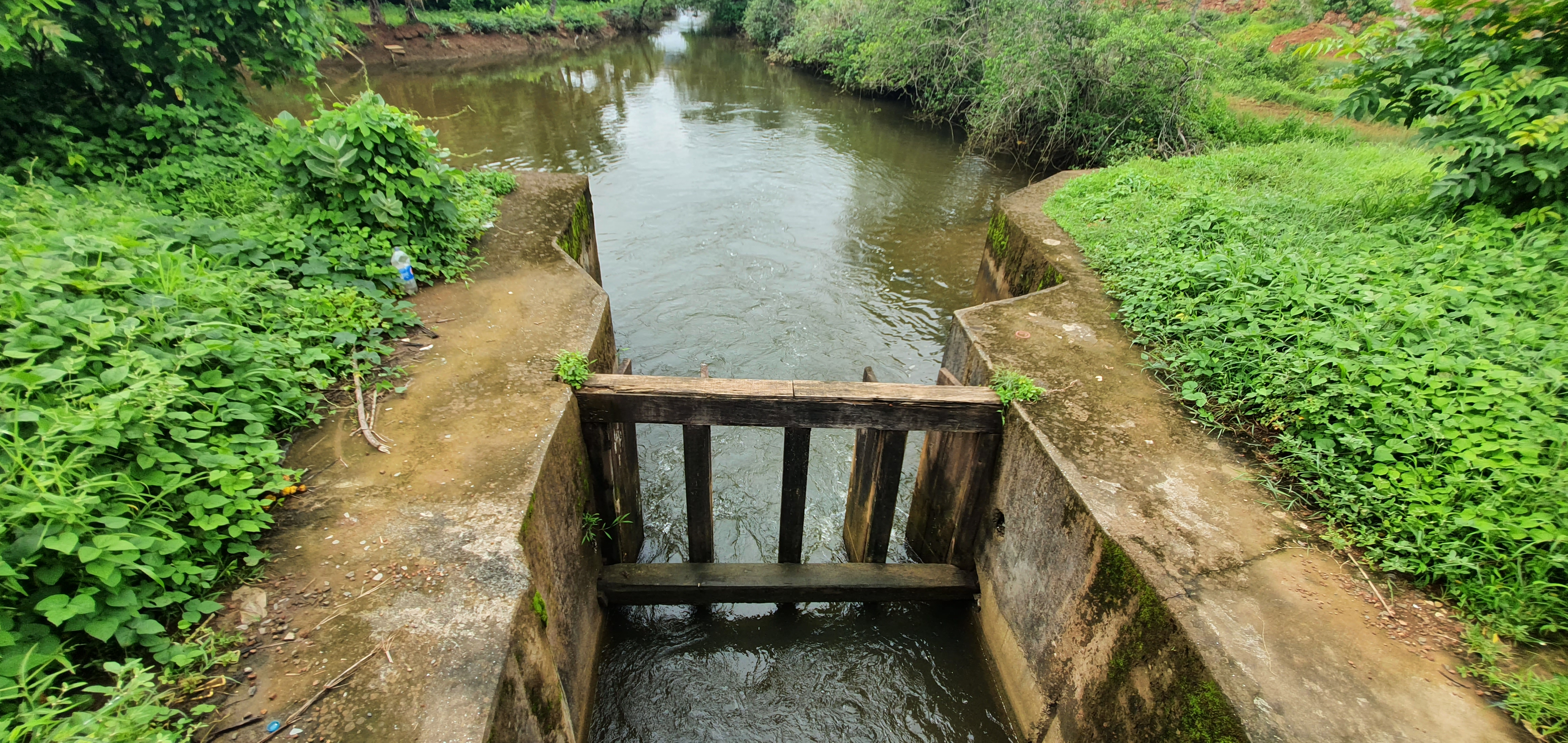
A very old Sluice located on the Loutolim-Rassiam road

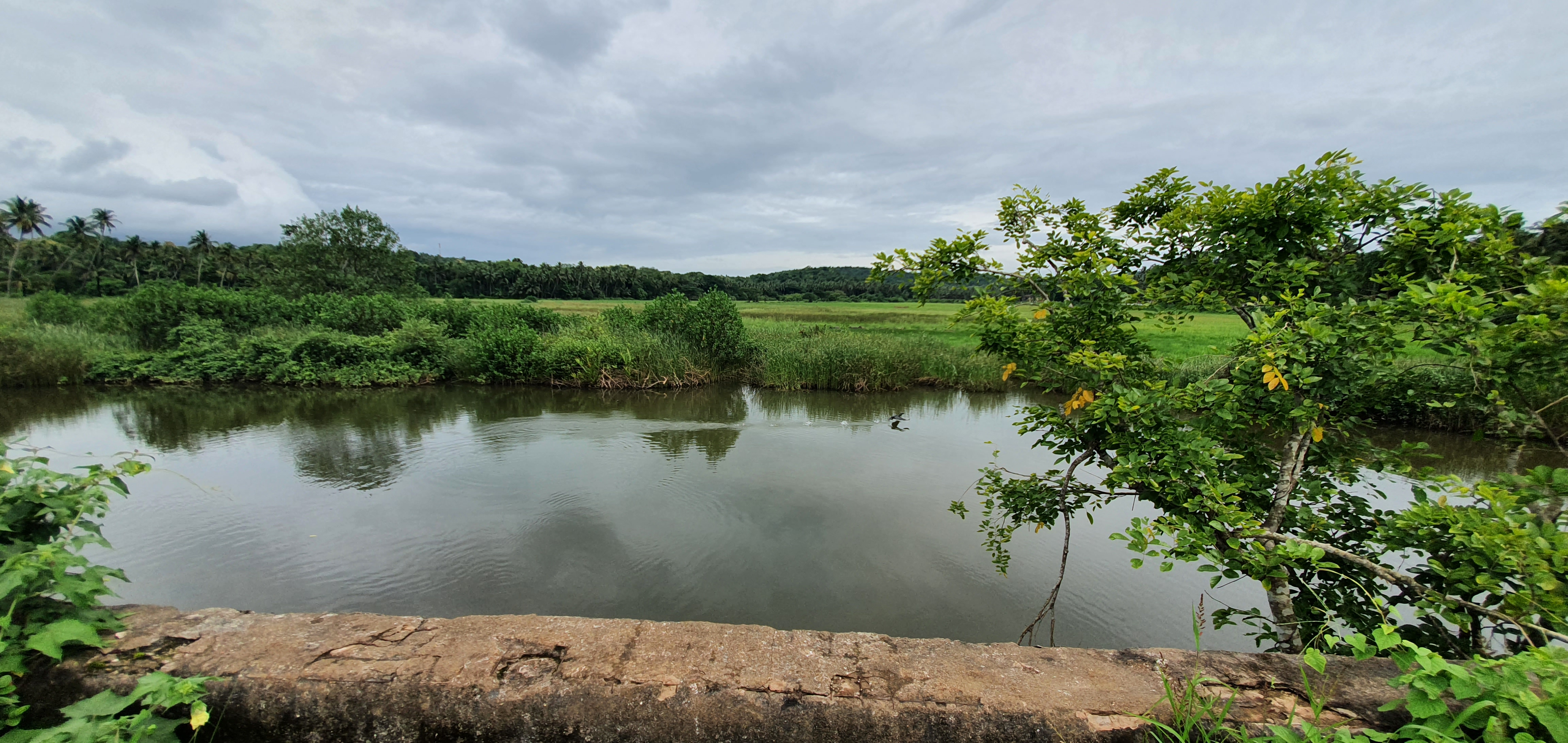
Fields of Loutolim

== See also ==
- Ramnathi
- Shenoy
- Portuguese India
- Raia
