= Vins (cartoonist) =

Indian cartoonist and illustrator

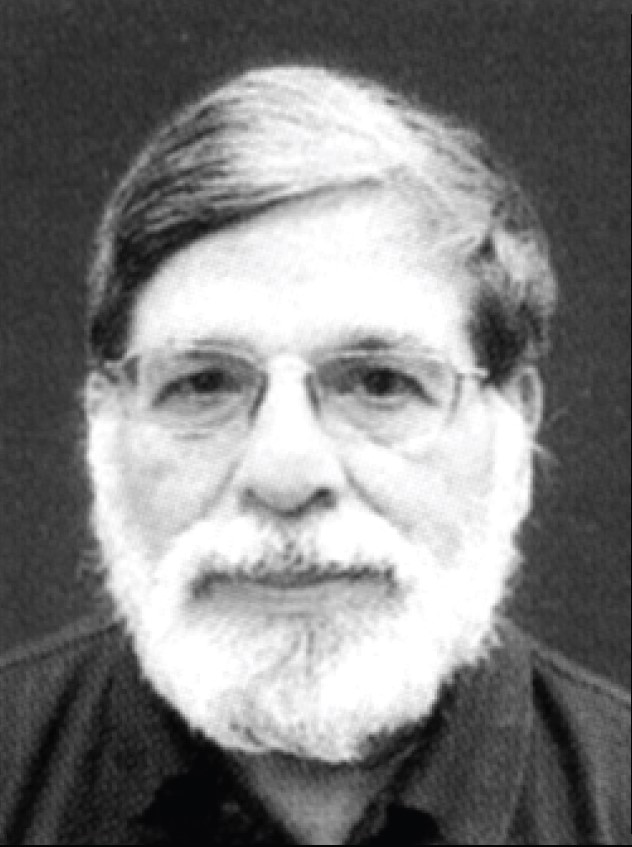
- Born: Vijay Narain Seth; 10 March 1944
- Died: 26 June 2014 (aged 70)
- Known for: cartoons; illustrations

Vijay Narain Seth (10 March 1944 – 26 June 2014), pen name Vins, was an Indian cartoonist and illustrator.

== Career ==
Vins graduated from the Sir J. J. School of Fine Arts, Mumbai, in 1968. While still a student, he went across to the Times of India from Sir J. J. School of ArArt all most next door to meet and watch cartoonist Mario Miranda (whom he considered a mentor) at work. He also started freelancing as a cartoonist for Caravan and Himmat magazines while a student.

He was a political cartoonist for the news magazine Himmat weekly from 1965 to 1981, contributing the pocket cartoon Chalta Hai weekly, and from 1969 adding two other cartoons with national and international comment. Later he started to freelance, doing cartoons on other themes such as science, computers, business, and social issues. He was the first Indian contributing cartoonist for the Indian edition of Reader's Digest in 1976 when Rahul Singh was its chief editor. Subsequently, he was a freelance cartoonist for the business magazines Business India and Business World and the Indian Express group's business publications. He also contributed to publications such as Science Today, a Times of India publication (1971–1984) and the Swiss satirical weekly Nebelspalter.

From 1978–1982, he was requested to contribute cartoons to a fortnightly, Treffpunkt, (editor Heidi Rudolf, published in Zurich, Switzerland 1978–1987). His work appears in The Penguin Book of Indian cartoons (1988). His cartoons have been exhibited in Hungary, Belgium, France, Portugal, Israel, Korea, and Japan (1998). 21 of his satirical cartoons are now part of the online cartoon museum of Aydin Dogan Wakfi in Istanbul, Turkey.

== Travels ==
Vins travelled extensively in Europe and met several internationally renowned graphic artists - such as the French cartoonist Andre Francois - whom he counted as influences. He has participated in many international cartoon festivals and exhibited in Europe in the 1990s.

== Collections ==
His cartoons have been made part of the permanent collection at the International Cartoon Museum and the Karikatur & Cartoon Museum, Basel in Switzerland.

== Awards ==
- FECO Edinburgh International Cartoon Festival - 5th prize winner in 1990
- Swiss Coalition of Development Organizations, Berne, Switzerland - the first prize winner at the international cartoon in 1996
- Taejon International Cartoon Institute, Taejon City, Korea competition - he was the fifth prize winner in 1997

== Bibliography ==
- Vins (Vijay N. Seth), Chalta Hai. Bombay: Miss Kalpana Sharma on behalf of Himmat Publications Trust, 1973.
